= Stratford =

Stratford may refer to:

== People ==
- Stratford (surname), a list of people with the surname Stratford or de Stratford
- Stratford (given name), a list of people
- House of Stratford, a British aristocratic family
- Tony Banks, Baron Stratford (1942–2006), British politician

== Places ==
=== Australia ===
- Stratford, Queensland, a suburb of Cairns
- Stratford, Victoria, a town
  - Stratford railway station, Victoria, a railway station
- Stratford, New South Wales, a town

=== Canada ===
- Stratford, Ontario, a city
  - Stratford station (Ontario), a Via Rail railway station
- Stratford, Prince Edward Island, a suburb of Charlottetown, the provincial capital
- Stratford, Quebec, a township

=== England ===
==== London ====
- Stratford, London, a locality of the London borough of Newham
  - Stratford station, a Mainline, London Underground, London Overground, Elizabeth line, National Rail and Docklands Light Railway station
  - Stratford International station, a main line railway and Docklands Light Railway station
  - Stratford High Street DLR station, a Docklands Light Railway station
  - Stratford West Ham (UK Parliament constituency) (1918–1950), East London
  - Stratford (ward), an electoral ward for Newham London Borough Council from 1964 to 2002 and from 2022
- Stratford-atte-Bow or Stratford, historical name of Bow, London
- Stratford Place, a small road in London, off Oxford Street, containing Stratford House

==== Suffolk ====
- Stratford St Andrew, a village and civil parish
- Stratford St. Mary, a village

==== Warwickshire ====
- Stratford-upon-Avon, a town in Warwickshire, the birth place of William Shakespeare
  - Stratford-on-Avon District, a local government district
  - Stratford-on-Avon (UK Parliament constituency)
- RAF Stratford, a former Royal Air Force satellite station south of Stratford-upon-Avon

==== Other counties ====
- Stratford Park, an area of Stroud, Gloucestershire
- Old Stratford, a village in Northamptonshire
- Stony Stratford and Fenny Stratford, neighbouring settlements in Buckinghamshire, close to Old Stratford
- Stratford-sub-Castle, a suburb of Salisbury, Wiltshire

=== New Zealand ===
- Stratford, New Zealand, a town
- Stratford (New Zealand electorate), a former parliamentary electorate

=== United States ===
- Stratford, California, a census-designated place
- Stratford, Connecticut, a town in Fairfield County
  - Stratford station (Connecticut), a Metro-North Railroad station
- Stratford, Illinois, an unincorporated community
- Stratford, Iowa, a city
- Stratford, Michigan, a ghost town
- Stratford, New Hampshire, a town
- Stratford, New Jersey, a borough
- Stratford, New York, a town
- Stratford, Ohio, an unincorporated community
- Stratford, Oklahoma, a town
- Stratford, South Dakota, a town
- Stratford, Texas, a city
- Stratford, Washington, an unincorporated community
- Stratford, Wisconsin, a village
- Stratford Hall (plantation), a National Register of Historic Places site in Virginia
- Stratford Shoal, Long Island Sound, Connecticut, site of Stratford Shoal Light, a lighthouse

=== Other places ===
- Stratford-on-Slaney, a village in West Wicklow, Ireland

== Schools ==
- Stratford University, a higher educational institution with campuses in the United States and India
- Stratford-upon-Avon College, Stratford-upon-Avon, England, an English further education college
- Stratford High School (disambiguation)
- Stratford School (disambiguation)
- Stratford Girls' Grammar School, Stratford-upon-Avon
- Stratford College, Dublin, Ireland, a day school
- Stratford Junior High School, Arlington, Virginia, United States
- Stratford Academy, Macon, Georgia, United States, a private school

== Ships ==
- HMCS Stratford, a Second World War Royal Canadian Navy minesweeper
- Stratford-class transport
  - USS Stratford, a World War II transport ship, one of two in the class
- HMS Stratford, a fictional ship in the war film Sailor of the King

== Sports ==
- FC Stratford, a football club based in Stratford-upon-Avon
- Stratford AFC, association football club based in Stratford, New Zealand

== Other uses ==
- Hotel Stratford, Alton, Illinois, United States, on the National Register of Historic Places
- Stratford Building, Grand Forks, North Dakota, United States, on the National Register of Historic Places
- Stratford Press (Cincinnati), a bygone private press

== See also ==
- Stratford House (disambiguation)
- Stratford Tony, a village in Wiltshire, England
- Fenny Stratford, a constituent town of Milton Keynes, Buckinghamshire, England
- Stony Stratford, a constituent town of Milton Keynes, Buckinghamshire, England
- Water Stratford, a village near Buckingham, Buckinghamshire, England
- Stratfield Saye, a village in Hampshire, England, also called Stratford Saye, Stratford Sea, and Strathfieldsay
- Stratfield Turgis or Stratford Turgis, a village in Hampshire, England
- Stratfield Mortimer or Stratford Mortimer, a civil parish and village in Berkshire and part of Hampshire, England
- The Stratford Residences, a building in Makati, Philippines
- Stratford Hall (school), Vancouver, British Columbia, Canada
- Stretford, a town in Trafford, Greater Manchester, England
- Strafford (disambiguation)
