= Stratford District =

Stratford District may refer to the following places:

- Stratford District, New Zealand, in the Taranaki Region of New Zealand
- Stratford-on-Avon District, in southern Warwickshire, England, formed in 1974

== See also ==
- Stratford, London, a metropolitan district in the London Borough of Newham in Greater London, England
- Stratford (disambiguation)
