= Oliver J. Olson & Company =

Former US Shipping Company

- Industry: Shipping, Lumber
- Founded: 1930 in San Francisco, California, United States
- Fate: Sold 1975 to Crown Zellerbach Corporation
- Key people: Oliver John Olson; Andrew F. Mahony; Charles F. Van Damme; Oliver John Olson Jr.; Oliver John Olson III; Edward Whitney (Whit) Olson; Andrew F. Mahony Jr.; George Olson; William Olson; Walter Olson; Frank Paramino; John C. Settle

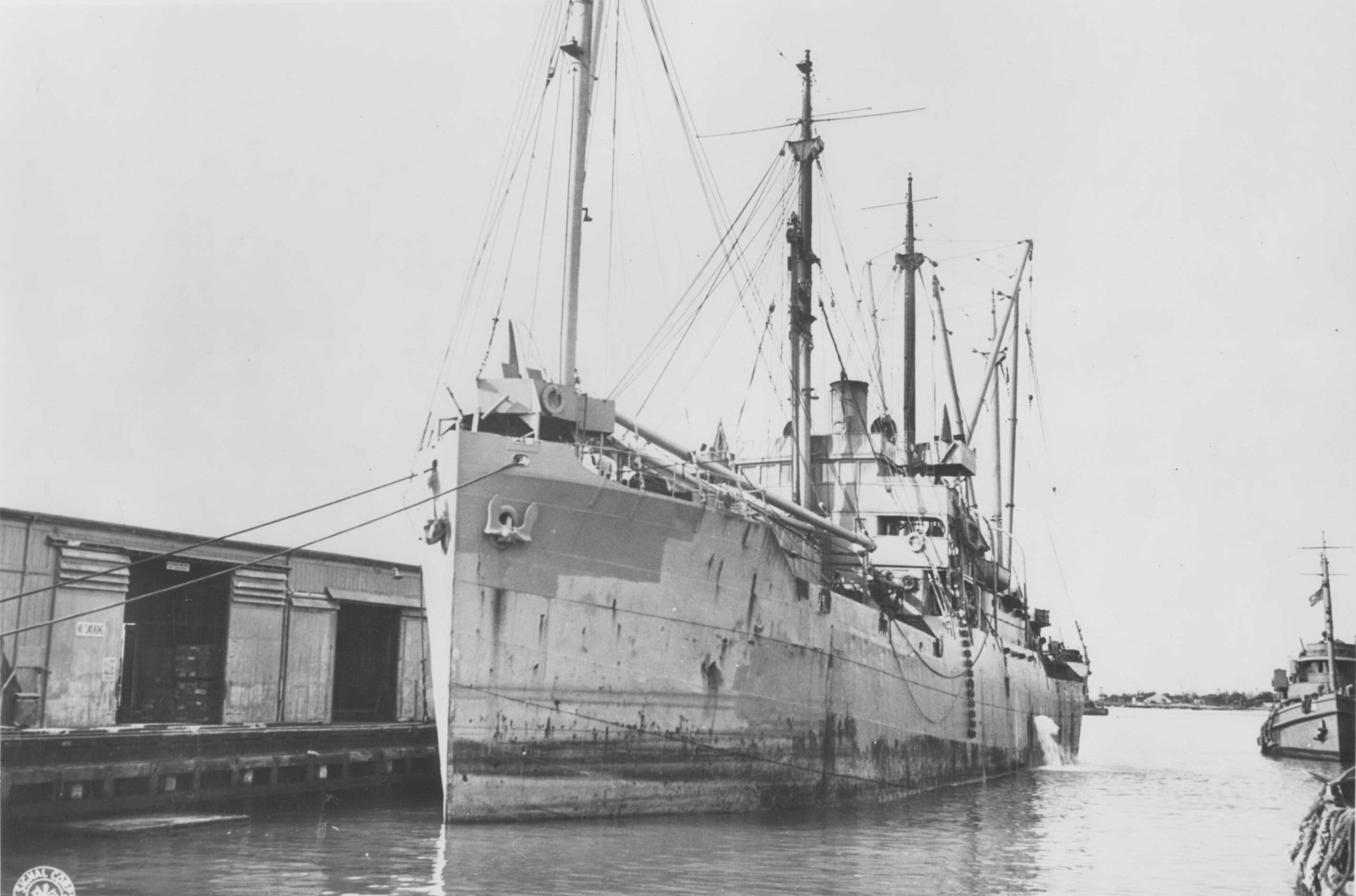
SS Barbara Olson

Oliver J. Olson & Company was a shipping company founded by Oliver John Olson in 1930 in San Francisco, California. Oliver John Olson started in the lumber trade. Oliver John Olson entered into a lumber partnership with Andrew F. Mahony in San Francisco in 1908. Oliver John Olson was president of the Olson-Mahony Lumber Company. Oliver John Olson was born in San Francisco on January 20, 1872.

== History ==
Oliver J. Olson Company was a shipping and lumber company founded by Oliver John Olson in 1916 in San Francisco, California. Oliver John Olson won a United States contract in April 1917 to build barracks, fences and buildings for the World War I effort. The Oliver J. Olson Company was very successful, already owning seven ships from his previous company. Olson also built a new ship the Florence Olson. Oliver J. Olson brothers and son worked on the ships. Post World War I Olson added routes to Hawaii, Mexico and the Panama Canal Zone. Oliver J. Olson Company bought four ships to add to the fleet. The Great Depression was hard but Oliver J. Olson Company was in good shape and made it through, moving the ships to more passager service. With his family an important part of this firm he incorporated in 1930 as Oliver J. Olson & Company. In 1937 Oliver J. Olson & Company won USA contacts for the movement of good to supply the built-up of World War 2, he purchased the SS Point Bonita a 1918 steamer, calling her Oliver Olson. Oliver J. Olson turned over more of the operations over to his sons. Oliver Jr. was president of the Richmond-San Rafael Ferry and later the other subsidiary Olson Ocean Towing Company. Edward Whitney (Whit) Olson became president of the Oliver J. Olson & Company. George Olson as Olson & Company vice president. Oliver J. Olson brothers William Olson and Walter Olson worked in the firm and rose. More routes were added to Los Angeles and San Diego, with more contract trips to Hawaii's Pearl Harbor. Needing more ships to go to Pearl Harbor Olson purchased the Coquina and Corrales, two steamers in Matson Navigation reserve fleet for $75,000 per ship. He renamed the ships the SS Cynthia Olson and Barbara Olson, they work Army Transport Service contacts. Later the Army Transport Service Bareboat charter both ships. In 1975 Oliver J. Olson Company and all of its subsidiaries were sold to Crown Zellerbach Corporation of San Francisco.

- Ships: George L. Olson, Whitney Olson, Virginia Olson, and Florence Olson, Oliver Olson, Cynthia Olson and Barbara Olson.

== Olson-Mahony Lumber Company ==
The Olson-Mahony Lumber Company, a timber distribution company, was founded by the partnerships of Oliver John Olson and Andrew F. Mahony in San Francisco in 1908. To store lumber, the Olson-Mahony Lumber Company leased 12,000 square feet of land and seawall wharf at Stockton street and the Embarcadero, what is now Sue Bierman Park. The Olson-Mahony Lumber Company then added a covered wharf for loading and unloading ships. The Olson & Mahony Company was very successful, growing from one ship in 1908 to seven ships by 1913. Olson-Mahony Lumber Company went into a partnership with the E.K. Wood Lumber Company, distributing their Lumber. Charles F. Van Damme (1881–1934), a Bay Area entrepreneur, became the company secretary. Charles F. Van Damme, Oliver John Olson, and Andrew F. Mahony started a subsidiary, the Richmond–San Rafael Ferry and Transportation Company. The company started the San Pablo Bay ferry service in 1915 between Castro Point in Richmond, California in Contra Costa County and San Quentin in Marin County. The first ferry owned was named Charles Van Damme, for Van Damme put up the money for the ferry. In 1916, Olson bought out Mahony's share of the Olson-Mahony Lumber Company, but both were still partners in the Richmond–San Rafael Ferry and Transportation Company. Their sons continued that partnership in Richmond–San Rafael Ferry. Mahony tried to start his own shipping company, but failed. He later became the San Francisco police commissioner till his death in 1933.

Van Damme State Park is named after Charles F. Van Damme. Van Damme had purchased what is now the park with funds from the Richmond–San Rafael Ferry and Transportation Company. Van Damme died in 1934 and the land became part of the California State Parks. Charles Van Damme's father, John Van Damme was born in Ostend, Belgium, and was an early settler of Mendocino, California. Charles Van Damme was born in 1881 in Little River, California.

== Olson Ocean Towing Company ==
Olson Ocean Towing Company was a subsidiary of Oliver J. Olson & Company. Olson Ocean Towing Company operated tugboat and barge transportation service. One of the Olson Ocean Towing Company tugs was named E. Whitney Olson Sr. built in 1965 by the San Diego Marine Construction Company of San Diego, California.

== World War II ==
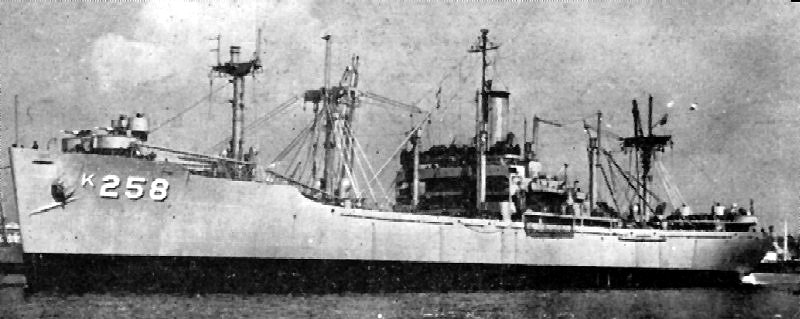
A Victory ship of World War II

Liberty ship of World War II

Oliver J. Olson & Company fleet of ships, Oliver J. Olson Lines, that were used to help the World War II effort. During World War II Oliver J. Olson & Company operated Merchant navy ships for the United States Shipping Board. During World War II JOliver J. Olson & Company was active with charter shipping with the Maritime Commission and War Shipping Administration. Oliver J. Olson & Company operated Liberty ships and Victory ships for the merchant navy. The ship was run by its Oliver J. Olson & Company crew and the US Navy supplied United States Navy Armed Guards to man the deck guns and radio.

== SS Cynthia Olson ==
On December 6, 1941 Japanese submarine I-26 sank the Cynthia Olson, with shells and torpedoes 1,000 miles northeast of Hawaii. Cynthia Olson's radio operator sent an SOS, picked up by SS Lurline and land station. Oliver J. Olson & Company Merchant Marine Master Berthel Carlsen was captain. The crew made it into the lifeboats and the next day, the Japanese submarine I-19 found them and provided some food. After the sighting, the 33 Cynthia Olson crew members and two United States Army passengers were ever seen again. The sinking was the first of many merchant ships to be sunk as the United States joined into World War II.

== SS E. A. Bryan ==
SS E. A. Bryan operated by Oliver J. Olson & Company exploded while loading munitions at Port Chicago, California on July 17, 1944. Of the 320 men killed, 31 were Oliver J. Olson & Company's merchant seamen and 13 were E. A. Bryan's US Navy Armed Guardsmen.

== Execution of crew members, SS Jean Nicolet ==
The United States Merchant Navy ship, SS Jean Nicolet operated by the Oliver J. Olson & Company, was torpedoed by Japanese submarine I-8 on July 2, 1944, off Ceylon at 03°28′S 074°30′E. Most of the crew make it into the lifeboats safety. The I-8 forced the crew onto the deck of the submarine and then killed most of them. The I-8 crew shot at both the crew and the lifeboats. The submarine crew took the crew's valuable. Those not shot, about 30 crew members, were hit and stabbed on the deck. Seeing in a plane, the submarine crew tossed overboard the remaining crew and dived. A Catalina flying boat spotted the crew in the water and sent Royal Navy armed trawler HMS Hoxa rescued the men. After over 30 hours in the water the crew was rescued on 4 July 1944.

== Ships ==
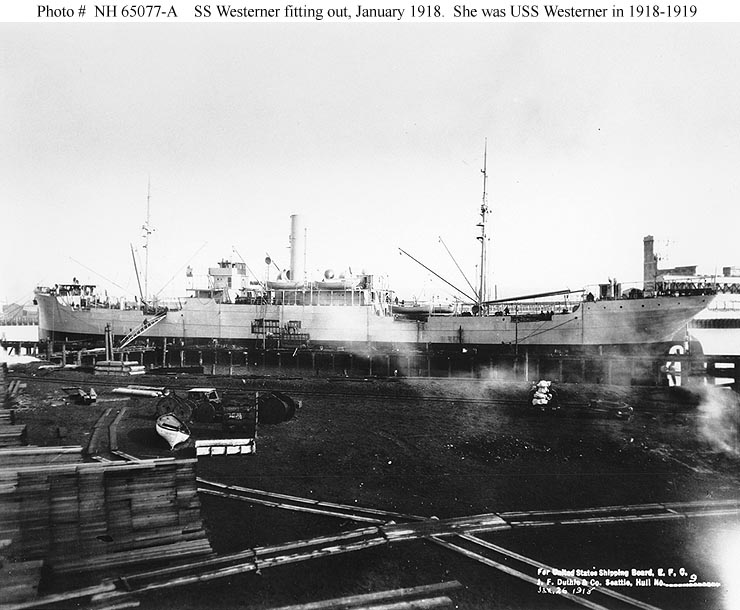
SS Westerner, an Oliver J. Olson & Company ship from 1919 to end of life

  - Ships:
- SS Howard Olson, purchased in 1946 for $116,000. Sank following collision with SS Marine Leopard on May 14, 1956, off Point Sur, California.
- SS Barbara Olson, was SS Corrales
- SS Cynthia Olson, was SS Coquina
- George L. Olson, was SS Ryder Hanify, ran aground Coos Bay, Oregon on the North shore.
- Whitney Olson
- Virginia Olson
- Florence Olson, owned from 1917 to 1923. sank in 1941 as SS Willapa off Mansfield, Oregon
- SS Oliver Olson, was Point Bonita
- Westerner
- Virginia Olson
- Annie Larson
  - Liberty ships operated for World War II:
- Sebastian Cermeno June 27, 1943 Torpedoed and sunk by U.511 in Indian Ocean.
- E. A. Bryan July 17, 1944 cargo exploded while loading munitions at Port Chicago, California a total loss.
- Don Marquis Sept. 9, 1944 lost after fire and beached after collision with SS Missionary Ridge off Papua New Guinea
- SS Samuel G. French
- SS Samuel Huntington bombed and destroyed
- SS Jean Nicolet July 2, 1944 Torpedoed, shelled and sunk by Japanese submarine I-8 south of Maldive Islands, most of crew killed in war crime.
  - Victory ships operated:
- Catawba Victory
- Hunter Victory
- SS Drexel Victory 20th Jan.1947 Grounded off Columbia River, Oregon. Refloated but sank 5 miles from Cape
- Texarkana Victory
- Wake Forest Victory
- Xavier Victory
  - Other
- SS Paraiso

== See also ==
- World War II United States Merchant Navy
