= AP-41 =

AP-41 or Ap-41 may refer to:

- Autopista AP-41, a proposed highway in central Spain
- USS Stratford (AP-41), a World War II U.S. Navy Stratford-class transport
