= USS Westerner =

Cargo ship of the United States Navy

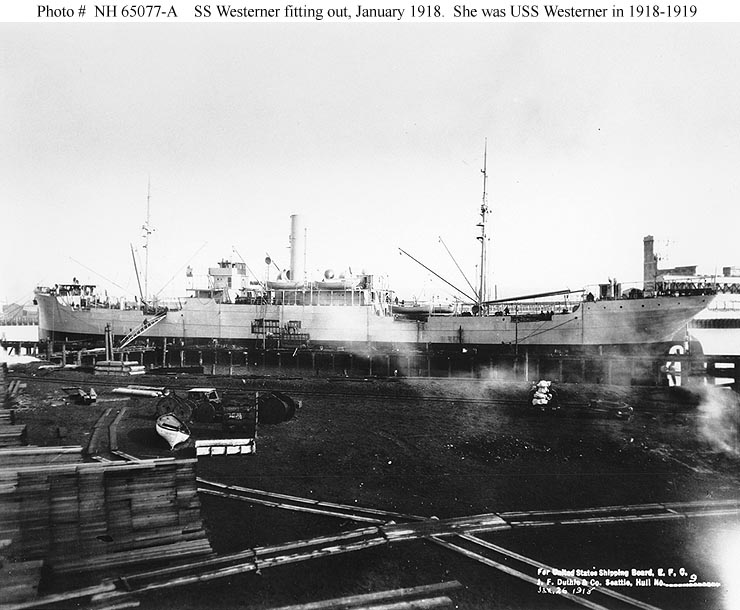
- SS Westerner fitting out at the J. F. Duthie and Company shipyard in Seattle, Washington, on 26 January 1918.

History

United States
- Name: USS Westerner
- Builder: J. F. Duthie and Company, Seattle, Washington
- Launched: 4 November 1917
- Completed: early 1918
- Acquired: 20 June 1918
- Commissioned: 20 June 1918
- Decommissioned: 21 August 1919
- Stricken: 21 August 1919
- Fate: Returned to U.S. Shipping Board 21 August 1919
- Notes: Operated as commercial cargo ship SS Westerner from 1919 with Oliver J. Olson & Company; Scrapped 1933

General characteristics
- Type: Cargo ship
- Displacement: 12,200 tons
- Length: 423 ft 9 in (129.16 m)
- Beam: 54 ft 0 in (16.46 m)
- Draft: 24 ft 1 in (7.34 m) (mean)
- Depth: 29 ft 9 in (9.07 m)
- Propulsion: One 2,500-ihp (1.864-mW) steam engine, one shaft
- Speed: 10.5 knots (19.4 km/h; 12.1 mph)
- Complement: 87
- Armament: 1 × 5-inch (127-mm) gun

USS Westerner (ID-2890) was a cargo ship of the United States Navy that served during World War I and its immediate aftermath.

== Construction and acquisition ==
Westerner was laid down as the steel-hulled, single-screw Design 1013 commercial cargo ship SS Westerner by J. F. Duthie and Company in Seattle, Washington, for the United States Shipping Board. She was launched on 4 November 1917 and completed early in 1918. She then steamed to the United States East Coast, where she was transferred to the U.S. Navy on 20 June 1918 at Norfolk, Virginia, assigned the naval registry identification number 2890, and commissioned the same day as USS Westerner (ID-2890).

== Navy career ==
Assigned to the Naval Overseas Transportation Service (NOTS), Westerner departed Norfolk on 10 July 1918 carrying a cargo of United States Army supplies and steamed to New York City. She departed New York on 24 July 1918 as part of a convoy bound for France. She developed engine trouble, forcing her to spend three days at Halifax, Nova Scotia, Canada, before resuming her voyage to France. She arrived at Brest, France, on 17 August 1918, then moved to St. Nazaire to discharge her cargo.

Westerner departed St. Nazaire on 22 September 1918 and made port at Norfolk on 10 October 1918, where she loaded another cargo of U.S. Army supplies. She subsequently conducted three additional cargo-carrying voyages under the control of NOTS: two to La Pallice, France (on one occasion lifting supplies consigned to the French government), and one to Trieste, Italy, via Gibraltar. After her final NOTS voyage, Westerner made port at New York City on 6 August 1919.

== Decommissioning and disposal ==
Decommissioned on 21 August 1919, Westerner was simultaneously struck from the Navy list and transferred back to the U.S. Shipping Board. Oliver J. Olson & Company became the operator of the ship for the U.S. Shipping Board.

== Later career ==
Once again SS Westerner, the ship operated commercially under Shipping Board control until laid up in the late 1920s. After that, she never returned to service and was abandoned due to age and deterioration in either late 1932 or early 1933.
