= SS Point Bonita =

Ship

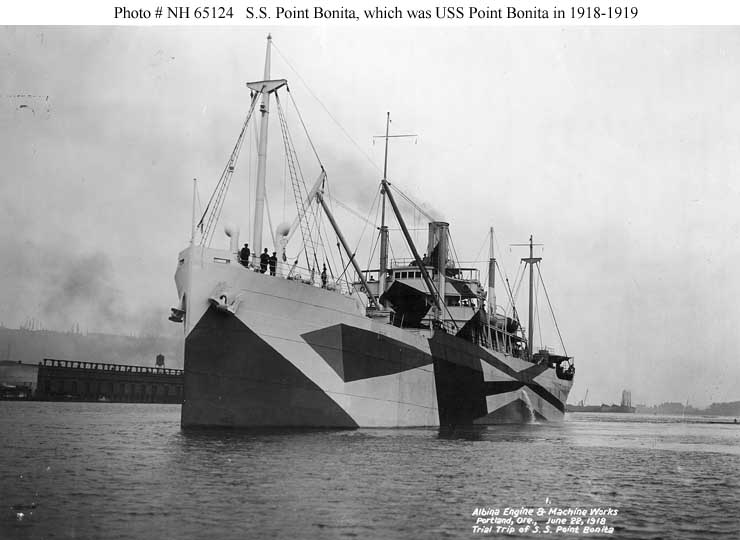
- S.S. Point Bonita (American freighter, 1918) on a trial trip on 22 June 1918, near the yard of her builder, the Albina Engine & Machine Works, Portland, Oregon. This ship was in commission as USS Point Bonita (ID-3496) from October 1918 to April 1919

History

United States
- Name: Point Bonita; San Pedro; Oliver Olson; Camanga
- Namesake: Point Bonita at the San Francisco Bay entrance; Camanga, one of the Philippine Islands
- Ordered: by foreign owners, requisitioned by USSB 1918
- Builder: Albina Engine & Machine Works, Portland, Oregon
- Laid down: 29 May 1917
- Launched: 27 March 1918
- Completed: delivered 24 June 1918
- Acquired: by the Navy, 7 October 1918; reacquired 25 April 1942
- Commissioned: 7 October 1918 as USS Point Bonita (ID-3496)
- Decommissioned: 7 April 1919, at New York City
- In service: 25 April 1942 as USS Camanga (AG-42)
- Out of service: 10 December 1945, at San Francisco, California
- Stricken: date unknown
- Homeport: Nouméa
- Identification: United States Official number: 216512
- Fate: Ran aground 3 November 1953 at the tip of the south jetty at Bandon, Oregon, and subsequently made part of the jetty.

General characteristics
- Type: Commercial cargo ship
- Tonnage: 2,235 GRT; 3,760 DWT
- Displacement: 5,200 tons
- Length: 300 ft (91 m)
- Beam: 44 ft (13 m)
- Draft: 21 ft 2 in (6.45 m)
- Propulsion: triple expansion reciprocating steam engine, single screw, 1,470shp
- Speed: 9 knots
- Complement: 60 officers and enlisted
- Armament: 3 x 3"/50 dual purpose gun mounts; 4 x 20mm AA gun mounts

SS Point Bonita was constructed in 1918 and launched 27 March 1918 after a hull being built for foreign owners at Albina Engine and Machine Works was requisitioned during World War I by the United States Shipping Board (USSB). The ship saw service as the Navy transport USS Point Bonita, assigned Identification Number 3496, from 7 October 1918 to 7 April 1919, was returned to the USSB and saw civilian service with several commercial companies as San Pedro and Oliver Olson before again seeing service in World War II as USS Camanga (AG-42). After return to commercial service as Oliver Olson the ship was wrecked at the entrance to Bandon harbor in Oregon.

== Construction ==
The ship was built in 1918, by Albina Engine and Machine Works, Portland, Oregon as the yard's hull #3 being built for foreign owners with keel laid on 29 May 1917. The hull was requisitioned by the United States Shipping Board and launched 27 March 1918 as Point Bonita. The ship design later became the Emergency Fleet Corporation designated Design 1049. The ship was delivered on 24 June 1918.

== World War I service ==
Point Bonita was acquired on 7 October 1918 by the Navy and commissioned the same date. The ship was assigned to the Naval Overseas Transportation Service. The ship departed New York 19 October in convoy and arrived at Nantes on 7 November with a cargo of military supplies and high explosives. After unloading she departed 15 November for Brest to join a westbound convoy on 18 November arriving at New York 16 December. There she loaded a cargo for the USSB, picked up Navy coal at Norfolk and departed for Hawaii 8 January 1919 arriving at Pearl Harbor 7 February. Upon arrival back at New York Point Bonita decommissioned and was transferred to the USSB on 7 April 1919.

== Interwar civilian service ==
In 1920 Point Bonita was sold to the Pacific Mail Steamship Company where she was engaged in freight only trade between San Francisco and Baltimore with a call at New York.

== World War II service ==
Oliver Olson was delivered to the War Shipping Administration (WSA) 25 April 1942 from Oliver J. Olson & Company at Honolulu, Hawaii and delivered to the Navy the same day under a sub bareboat charter with WSA.

Commissioned on the day of delivery under the command of Lieutenant R. M. Baughman, USNR as Camanga the ship was designated AG-42. Illustrating graphically the need for all available shipping in meeting the Navy's enormous logistic assignment in the Pacific Ocean, Camanga, already 24 years old, sailed from Pearl Harbor 1 June 1942 for Pago Pago, Samoa, where she took up duty carrying cargo and fuel drums between the Samoan and Ellice Islands.

After overhaul at San Francisco, California, between 30 March and 6 June 1943, Camanga returned to Nouméa for operations throughout the South Pacific Ocean. She continued this essential back-area support of fleet operations from Guadalcanal to the islands of the Bismarck Archipelago between April and October 1944, returning then to base at Nouméa.

An overhaul at Auckland, New Zealand, from November 1944 to January 1945 was the only further interruption to her busy schedule in the New Caledonia area until 1 October 1945 when she cleared for the U.S. West Coast. During this period Camanga was assigned to Service Force Pacific Fleet and under the command of Lieutenant F.A. Muller and Lieutenant Commander J. W. Baldwin.

Camanga was decommissioned at San Francisco, California, 10 December 1945 and returned to the War Shipping Administration the same day.

== Wreck ==
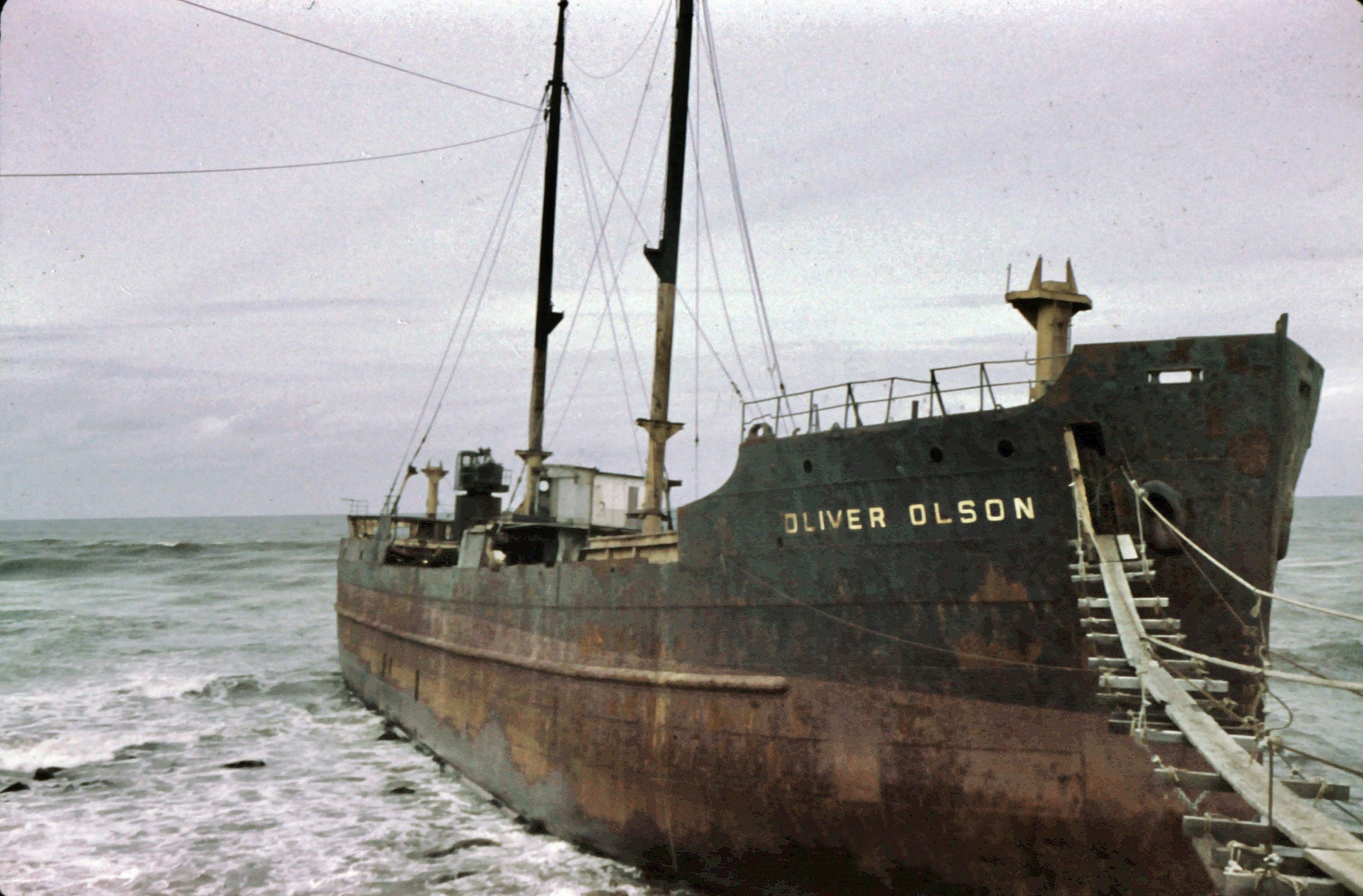
Wreck of the Oliver Olson at Bandon, OR, South Jetty. Photo by Howard O. Wahlen spring 1954.

After decommissioning, the ship was reacquired by the Oliver J. Olson Steamship Company. She returned to her former name, Oliver Olson, and was employed in the transportation of lumber. On 3 November 1953, she ran aground at the entrance to Bandon harbor in Oregon, becoming stuck on Coquille River's south jetty. The 29 members of crew were rescued, but the ship was declared a total loss and offered for sale to the scrap industry. The wreck was only partially salvaged, however, and what remained of the hull was eventually filled with rocks to form an extension of the jetty. The ship can still be seen today at low tide.

== Bibliography ==
- Colton, T (1 September 2014). "Albina Engine & Machine Works, Portland OR". Shipbuilding History. T. Colton.
- Maritime Administration. "Oliver Olson". Ship History Database Vessel Status Card. U.S. Department of Transportation, Maritime Administration. Archived from the original on 27 June 2015.
- McKellar, Norman L. "Requisitioned Steel Ships, Part I" (PDF). Steel Shipbuilding under the U. S. Shipping Board, 1917-1921. ShipScribe.
- Naval History And Heritage Command. "Point Bonita". Dictionary of American Naval Fighting Ships. Naval History And Heritage Command.
- Naval History And Heritage Command. "Camanga". Dictionary of American Naval Fighting Ships. Naval History And Heritage Command.
- Naval History And Heritage Command. "Beans, Bullets, and Black Oil—The Story of Fleet Logistics Afloat in the Pacific During World War II". Naval History And Heritage Command.
- Photo gallery of SS Point Bonita at NavSource Naval History
- Pacific Mail Steamship Company (6 November 1920). "Pacific Mail Steamship Company advertisement".
- "Portland Ship Deliveries". Pacific Marine Review. 15 (September). San Francisco: J.S. Hines: 127. 1918.
