= SS Cynthia Olson =

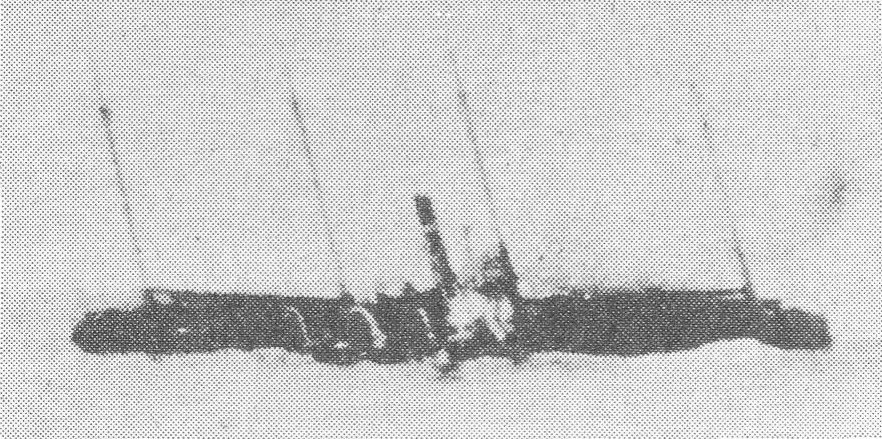
- Sinking of SS Cynthia Olson; photograph taken by Saburo Hayashi, gunnery officer of the Japanese submarine I-26.

History
- Name: 1918-1940:SS Coquina; 1940-1941:SS Cynthia Olson
- Operator: 1918-1925: United States Shipping Board; 1925-1931: Pillsbury-Curtis; 1931-1934: Los Angeles Steamship Co.; 1934-1935: California Steamship Co.; 1935-1940: Matson Navigation Co. - Alexander & Baldwin; 1940-1941: Oliver J. Olson & Company
- Port of registry: (United States)
- Builder: Manitowoc Shipbuilding Company, Manitowoc, Wisconsin
- Yard number: 100
- Launched: November 30, 1918
- Out of service: December 7, 1941
- Identification: Official number: 217871; Signal letters: LQRK
- Fate: Sunk by Japanese submarine I-26 about 1,200 miles west of Seattle on December 7, 1941

General characteristics
- Type: Cargo ship
- Tonnage: 2,153 GRT (1919); 2,140 GRT (1920)
- Length: 250 ft 5 in (76.3 m) registered length
- Beam: 43 ft 7 in (13.3 m)
- Depth: 20 ft 1 in (6.1 m)
- Installed power: 1250 i.h.p.
- Propulsion: 1 triple expansion steam engine, 2 boilers, 1 screw
- Speed: 10 knots
- Crew: 35

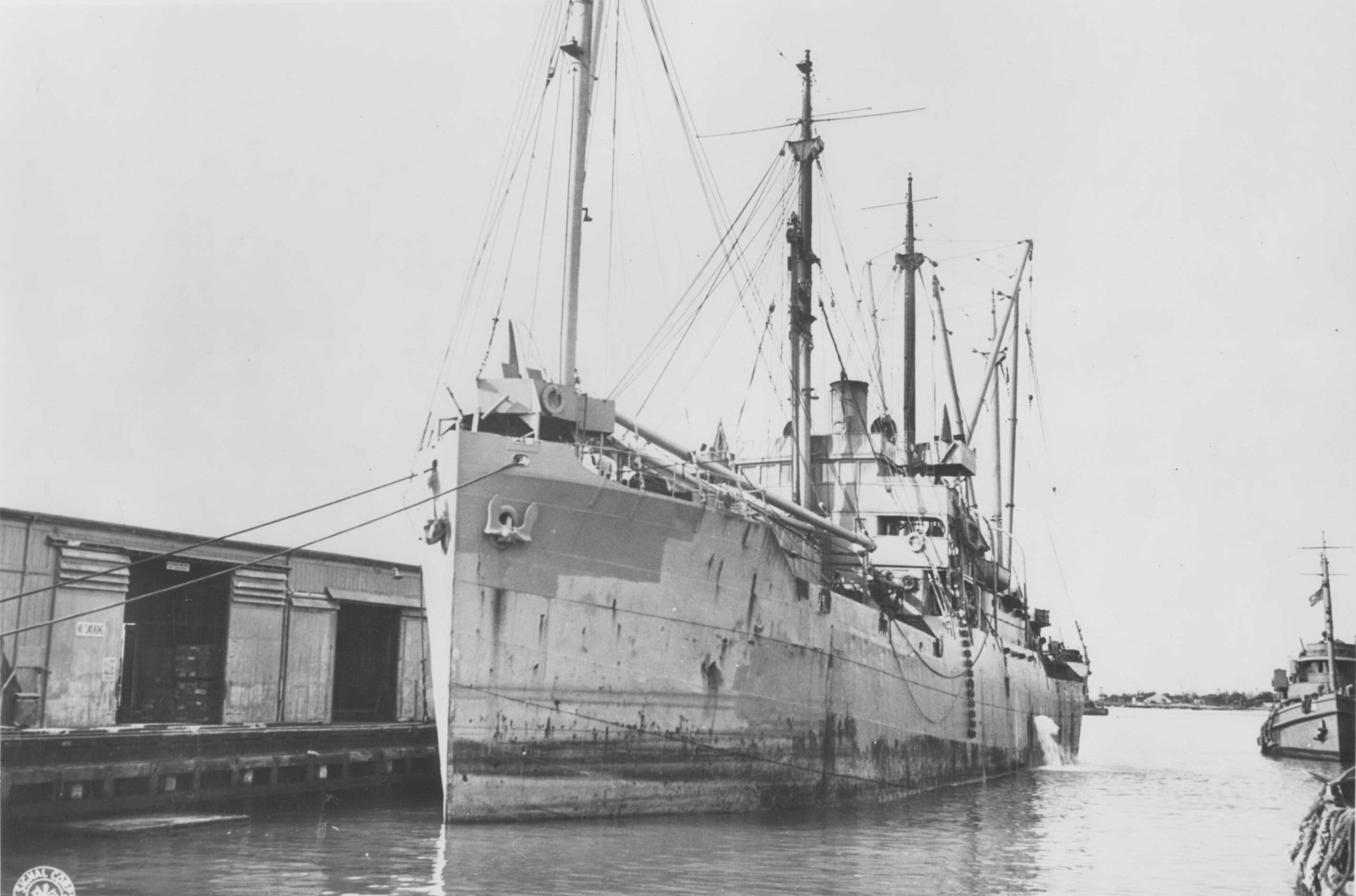
SS Barbara Olson sister ship to the SS Cynthia Olson

SS Cynthia Olson was a cargo ship originally built in Wisconsin in 1918 as the SS Coquina. Renamed in 1940, in August 1941 she was chartered by the US Army to transport supplies to Hawaii. While in passage between Tacoma, Washington and Honolulu on December 7, she was intercepted by the Japanese submarine I-26, which sank her with gunfire. Although the commander of the submarine ensured that all of the crew had escaped into boats, none of them were ever found. Cynthia Olson was the first United States Merchant Marine vessel to be sunk after the entry of the United States into World War II.

== Construction ==
SS Coquina was ordered by the United States Shipping Board during World War I. She was laid down in the late summer of 1918 and being built in prefabricated steel sections, was able to be launched on November 30. The ship was one of nine Emergency Fleet Corporation Design 1044 hulls known as "Laker, Manitowoc Type" ordered from the Manitowoc Shipbuilding Company in Manitowoc, Wisconsin. The yard is known to have completed six hulls with Coquina, yard hull number 100, being completed in April 1919 assigned official number 217871 and signal letters LQRK. Ship's characteristics were 2,153 GRT, changed in the 1920 register to 2,140 GRT, 250 ft 5 in (76.3 m) registered length, 43 ft 7 in (13.3 m) beam with a depth of 20 ft 1 in (6.1 m).

== Service ==
Hostilities having ended with the Armistice of 11 November 1918, she was surplus to requirements and on completion, was laid up on Lake Michigan. In December 1919, Coquina was chartered to help export stocks of whisky which had been made unsaleable by the Volstead Act that had introduced prohibition in the United States. There followed another period of lying idle, this time in New York, until she was purchased in 1925 by Pillsbury and Curtis for the West Coast lumber trade. After a conversion and refit, she arrived in San Pedro Bay, California but was again laid up. In 1931, she was sold on again for the sum of $10 to the Los Angeles Steamship Company, which like Pillsbury was a subsidiary of Matson Navigation. In 1933 she was sold on to another Matson subsidiary, the California Steamship Company, and in 1936, was transferred to the parent company and finally began to work on chartered voyages along the West Coast carrying lumber. On January 1, 1940, the Coquina was put up for sale and was purchased by Oliver J. Olson & Company of San Francisco for $85,000, who renamed her Cynthia Olson. She was bareboat chartered by the US Army Transportation Corps in August 1941.

== Sinking ==
On December 6, 1941, SS Cynthia Olson was in the Pacific about midway on the great circle between Tacoma, Washington and Honolulu, Hawaii with a cargo of lumber for the US Army. At about 22:00 Hawaii Time, she was spotted by the Japanese submarine I-26 which overtook the Cynthia Olson and conformed to her course while running ahead of her on the surface throughout the night. The submarine's captain, Commander Minoru Yokota, had been ordered not to open hostilities against American vessels until 08:00 on December 7, which was the intended time of the Attack on Pearl Harbor. Eight hours after the attack, a Japanese declaration of war on the United States would be printed in Japanese newspapers on December 8, 1941. When zero-hour arrived, I-26 fired a warning shot with the 14 cm deck gun intended to halt the Cynthia Olson but she continued to run on. The submarine then fired a torpedo which missed, but brought the freighter to a halt. Yokota observed the crew taking to the ship's two lifeboats before attempting to sink her with gunfire. Before abandoning ship, the ship's radio operator had managed to broadcast a distress call stating that they were being attacked by a submarine; this was received by the American liner, SS Lurline, which was a considerable distance away bound for San Francisco.

Meanwhile, 18 shells had failed to sink the Cynthia Olson, so Yokota dived and fired a second torpedo without a result. Surfacing again, a further 29 shells were fired into the ship, before she finally turned over onto her port side and I-26 left the scene, some five hours after the start of the engagement. The next day, the Japanese submarine I-19 gave some food to some of the survivors, but following that, no trace of the 33 crew members and two Army passengers was ever found. Cynthia Olson was the first American flagged merchant vessel to be sunk after the entry of the United States into the war. On the following day, President Franklin D. Roosevelt alluded to her loss in his speech to the Joint session of the United States Congress which has become known as the Infamy Speech.

== See also ==
- USS Stratford (AP-41) sister ship
- USS Gemini (AP-75) sister ship
