= Strafford =

Strafford may refer to:

== Places ==
In the United States:

- Strafford, Missouri, a city
- Strafford, New Hampshire, a town
- Strafford, Pennsylvania
- Strafford, Vermont, a town
- Strafford County, New Hampshire

== Other ==
- Thomas Wentworth, 1st Earl of Strafford (1593–1641), politician impeached and executed in 1641
- Earl of Strafford, a title that has been created several times in British history
- Stephen Strafford, British air marshal
- Strafford (play), written in 1837 by Robert Browning
- Strafford Moss, musical theatre tenor

== See also ==
- Stafford (disambiguation)
- Stratford (disambiguation)
