= SS Albert Gallatin =

World War II Liberty ship of the United States

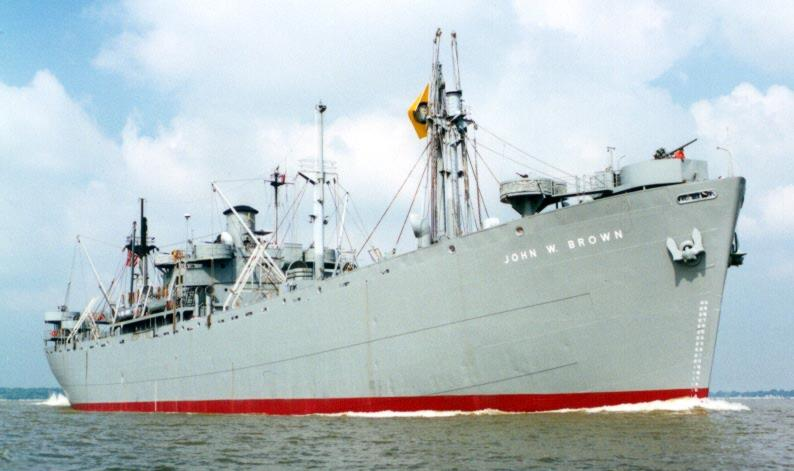
- SS John W Brown, a ship of the same class.

History

United States
- Name: Albert Gallatin
- Namesake: Albert Gallatin (1761–1849), U.S. Secretary of the Treasury (1801–1814)
- Operator: American-Hawaiian Steamship Company (1942); Isthmian Steamship Company (1944)
- Builder: California Shipbuilding Corporation, Terminal Island, Los Angeles, California
- Yard number: 9
- Completed: April 1942
- Identification: IMO number: 241618; Callsign: LERH
- Fate: Sunk by I-26, 2 January 1944

General characteristics
- Class & type: Liberty ship; type EC2-S-C1, standard
- Tonnage: 10,865 LT DWT; 7,176 GRT
- Displacement: 3,380 long tons (3,434 t) (light); 14,245 long tons (14,474 t) (max)
- Length: 441 feet 6 inches (135 m) oa; 416 feet (127 m) pp; 427 feet (130 m) lwl
- Beam: 57 feet (17 m)
- Draft: 27 ft 9.25 in (8.4646 m)
- Installed power: 2 × Oil fired 450 °F (232 °C) boilers, operating at 220 psi (1,500 kPa); 2,500 hp (1,900 kW)
- Propulsion: 1 × triple-expansion steam engine, (manufactured by General Machinery Corp., Hamilton, Ohio); 1 × screw propeller
- Speed: 11.5 knots (21.3 km/h; 13.2 mph)
- Capacity: 562,608 cubic feet (15,931 m^{3}) (grain); 499,573 cubic feet (14,146 m^{3}) (bale)
- Complement: 38–62 USMM; 21–40 USNAG
- Armament: Varied by ship; Bow-mounted 3-inch (76 mm)/50-caliber gun; Stern-mounted 4-inch (102 mm)/50-caliber gun; 2–8 × single 20-millimeter (0.79 in) Oerlikon anti-aircraft (AA) cannons and/or, 2–8 × 37-millimeter (1.46 in) M1 AA guns

SS Albert Gallatin was an American Liberty ship that operated during World War II. She was named for Albert Gallatin (1761–1849), an American politician, diplomat, ethnologist, and linguist who served as the United States Secretary of the Treasury from 1801 to 1814. She was sunk by the Imperial Japanese Navy submarine I-26 in the Arabian Sea in 1944.

== Construction ==
Albert Gallatin was built by the California Shipbuilding Corporation on Terminal Island in Los Angeles, California, as Hull No. 277. She was delivered in April 1942 to the War Shipping Administration. Her call sign was LERH.

== Service history ==
Upon completion in April 1942, Albert Gallatin entered service in the United States Merchant Marine, initially operated by the American-Hawaiian Steamship Company. Escorted by the United States Navy blimp K-34, she was on a northbound voyage in the Atlantic Ocean on 28 August 1943 when the German U-boat U-107, commanded by Kapitänleutnant Volker Simmermacher, attacked her 110 nautical miles (204 km; 127 mi) southeast of Savannah, Georgia, at 17:00. U-107 fired three torpedoes, two of which missed. One hit Albert Gallatin′s propeller but failed to detonate and inflicted only minor damage.

By 1944, the Isthmian Steamship Company of New York City operated Albert Gallatin. On 2 January 1944, she was making an unescorted voyage from Aden to Bandar Shahpur, Iran, carrying 7,954 tons of cargo and mail when the Imperial Japanese Navy submarine I-26, commanded by Lieutenant Commander Toshio Kusaka, attacked her in the Arabian Sea just outside the Gulf of Oman. I-26 fired four torpedoes, most of which missed, then surfaced and opened fire on Albert Gallatin with her 140-millimeter (5.5 in) deck gun. As Albert Gallatin began to sink, a Royal Air Force Bristol Blenheim aircraft arrived on the scene and dropped four bombs on I-26, inflicting minor damage on her. Albert Gallatin subsequently sank 60 nautical miles (111 km; 69 mi) off the coast of the Arabian Peninsula at 21°21′N 59°58′E. All on board — her crew of 43 merchant mariners and her 28-man United States Navy Armed Guard detachment — abandoned ship in her lifeboats. The Norwegian motor tanker MV Britannia, built in 1939, later rescued them.
