= Battles of Tilton =

American civil war battles

- Part of the American Civil War
Date	May 13, 1864 (first); October 13, 1864 (second)
Location	Whitfield County, Georgia 34°39′57″N 84°56′4″W
Result	Confederate victories

Belligerents
United States (Union)	(Confederate States of America) CSA (Confederacy)

Commanders and leaders
Second: Simpson M. Archer (Note: aka Sampson, Samson or Samuel M. Archer)	First: Joseph Wheeler; Second; Alexander P. Stewart; Samuel Gibbs French; William M. Seldon (Note: also recorded as Selden)

Units involved
First: 2nd Indiana Cavalry Regiment; 4th Indiana Cavalry Regiment; 18th Independent Battery Indiana Light Artillery; 8th Iowa Cavalry Regiment; 2nd Michigan Cavalry Regiment; 1st Tennessee Cavalry Regiment; 1st Wisconsin Cavalry; Second: 17th Iowa Infantry Regiment	First: Wheeler's Calvalry; Second: French’s Division of Stewart’s Corps, Confederate Army of Tennessee; Seldon's Battery

Strength
Second: Near 300	Unknown

Casualties and losses
Second: 244 captured	Unknown

The Battles of Tilton were two one-day skirmishes in the American Civil War. The first of which was during the Atlanta campaign, the second was during Hood's Tennessee Campaign. The battles were fought in Tilton, Georgia, in Whitfield County, located a few miles south of Dalton, Georgia, near the Conasauga River.

The First Battle of Tilton was a skirmish on May 13, 1864. The Confederate side was led by Maj. Gen. Joseph Wheeler.

The Second Battle of Tilton occurred on October 13, 1864, when soldiers of Maj. Gen. Samuel G. French's Division of Lt. Gen. Stewart's Corps of the Confederate Army of Tennessee besieged a military garrison of 300 soldiers of the 17th Iowa Infantry Regiment commanded by Lt. Col. Simpson M. Archer. The blockhouse had been constructed a few months prior to the battle, to guard the Western and Atlantic Railroad. Commanded by Archer, the 17th Iowa Regiment barricaded themselves in the blockhouse and surrendered upon exhausting their ammunition supply.

A future member of the Iowa General Assembly, Pvt. William Graham Buck, was among those captured at the battle. Union prisoners captured at the battle were sent to Camp Lawton or Camp Sumter in Andersonville.
