= SS Samuel G. French =

World War II Liberty ship of the United States

History

United States
- Name: Samuel G. French
- Namesake: Samuel G. French
- Owner: War Shipping Administration (WSA)
- Operator: Oliver J. Olson & Company
- Ordered: as type (EC2-S-C1) hull, MC hull 2294
- Builder: J.A. Jones Construction, Panama City, Florida
- Cost: $999,159
- Yard number: 35
- Way number: 2
- Laid down: 31 January 1944
- Launched: 21 March 1944
- Sponsored by: Miss Ada French
- Completed: 22 April 1944
- Identification: Call Signal: KWKB
- Fate: Laid up in National Defense Reserve Fleet, Hudson River Group, 25 May 1946; Sold to the Netherlands, 25 November 1946

Netherlands
- Name: Egmond
- Namesake: Egmond
- Owner: Netherlands Government
- Acquired: 25 November 1946
- Fate: Sold, 1947

Netherlands
- Name: Alcyone
- Namesake: Alcyone
- Owner: Van Nievelt, Goudriaan & Co's Stoomvaart-Maatschappij N.V.
- Acquired: 1947
- Fate: Sold, 1958

Liberia
- Name: Nicos S.
- Owner: Goulandris Ltd., London
- Operator: Tricontinental Transport Corp.
- Acquired: 1958
- Fate: Sold, 1963

Greece
- Name: Nicos S.
- Owner: Syros Shipping Co., London
- Acquired: 1963
- Fate: Scrapped, 1971

General characteristics
- Class & type: Liberty ship; type EC2-S-C1, standard
- Tonnage: 10,865 LT DWT; 7,176 GRT
- Displacement: 3,380 long tons (3,434 t) (light); 14,245 long tons (14,474 t) (max)
- Length: 441 feet 6 inches (135 m) oa; 416 feet (127 m) pp; 427 feet (130 m) lwl
- Beam: 57 feet (17 m)
- Draft: 27 ft 9.25 in (8.4646 m)
- Installed power: 2 × Oil fired 450 °F (232 °C) boilers, operating at 220 psi (1,500 kPa); 2,500 hp (1,900 kW)
- Propulsion: 1 × triple-expansion steam engine, (manufactured by Iron Fireman Manufacturing Co., Portland, Oregon); 1 × screw propeller
- Speed: 11.5 knots (21.3 km/h; 13.2 mph)
- Capacity: 562,608 cubic feet (15,931 m^{3}) (grain); 499,573 cubic feet (14,146 m^{3}) (bale)
- Complement: 38–62 USMM; 21–40 USNAG
- Armament: Varied by ship; Bow-mounted 3-inch (76 mm)/50-caliber gun; Stern-mounted 4-inch (102 mm)/50-caliber gun; 2–8 × single 20-millimeter (0.79 in) Oerlikon anti-aircraft (AA) cannons and/or, 2–8 × 37-millimeter (1.46 in) M1 AA guns

SS Samuel G. French was a Liberty ship built in the United States during World War II. She was named after Samuel G. French, a United States Military Academy graduate in 1843, he obtained the rank of Captain in the US Army and was a veteran of the Mexican–American War. French joined the Confederate States Army during the American Civil War and rose to the rank of Major General.

== Construction ==
Samuel G. French was laid down on 31 January 1944, under a Maritime Commission (MARCOM) contract, MC hull 2294, by J.A. Jones Construction, Panama City, Florida; sponsored by Miss Ada French, granddaughter of namesake, she was launched on 21 March 1944.

== History ==
She was allocated to Oliver J. Olson & Company, on 22 April 1944. On 25 May 1946, she was laid up in the National Defense Reserve Fleet, in the Hudson River Group. On 25 November 1946, she was sold to the Netherlands for $549,890.31 for commercial use and renamed Egmond. After going through several more owners she was scrapped in Castellon, Spain, in 1971.

== Bibliography ==
- "Jones Construction, Panama City FL". www.ShipbuildingHistory.com. 13 October 2010.
- "Liberty Ships – World War II".
- Maritime Administration. "Samuel G. French". Ship History Database Vessel Status Card. U.S. Department of Transportation, Maritime Administration. Archived from the original on 12 December 2019.
- Davies, James (May 2004). "Specifications (As-Built)" (PDF). p. 23.
- "SS Samuel G. French".
