= SS Robert F. Hoke =

Cargo Ship

History

United States
- Name: Robert F. Hoke
- Namesake: Robert Hoke
- Builder: North Carolina Shipbuilding Company, Wilmington, North Carolina
- Yard number: 152
- Way number: 2
- Laid down: 10 April 1943
- Launched: 4 May 1943
- Fate: Scrapped 1949

General characteristics
- Type: Liberty ship
- Tonnage: 7,000 long tons deadweight (DWT)
- Length: 441 ft 6 in (134.57 m)
- Beam: 56 ft 11 in (17.35 m)
- Draft: 27 ft 9 in (8.46 m)
- Propulsion: Two oil-fired boilers; Triple expansion steam engine; Single screw; 2,500 hp (1,864 kW)
- Speed: 11 knots (20 km/h; 13 mph)
- Capacity: 9,140 tons cargo
- Complement: 41
- Armament: 1 × Stern-mounted 4 in (100 mm) deck gun; AA guns

SS Robert F. Hoke (MC contract 1968) was a Liberty ship built in the United States during World War II. She was named after Robert Hoke, Confederate Army Major General, politician, and Director of the North Carolina Railroad.

The ship was laid down by North Carolina Shipbuilding Company in their Cape Fear River yard on April 10, 1943, then launched on May 4, 1943.

On December 28, 1943, while operated by American Export Lines, en route from Abadan, Iran, to Mombasa, Kenya, in the Arabian Sea the Robert F. Hoke was torpedoed by Japanese submarine I-26. A 700-square-foot hole was blown in the hull but she remained afloat. The Naval Armed Guard detachment remained on board, firing to keep I-26 down while the crew abandoned ship. After the submarine retreated, the crew reboarded the ship but are unable to get her underway. 68 crew (41 merchant sailors and 27 Naval Armed Guardsmen) were rescued by a Royal Air Force crash boat.

The Robert F. Hoke was taken under tow by Royal Navy tug HMS Masterful and taken to Aden where she was written off as a loss. She was cut down into a self-propelled barge and used as a Royal Navy training vessel in Bombay, India until being sold in 1948. She was scrapped in Bombay in 1949.
