= USS Malanao =

Cargo ship of the United States Navy

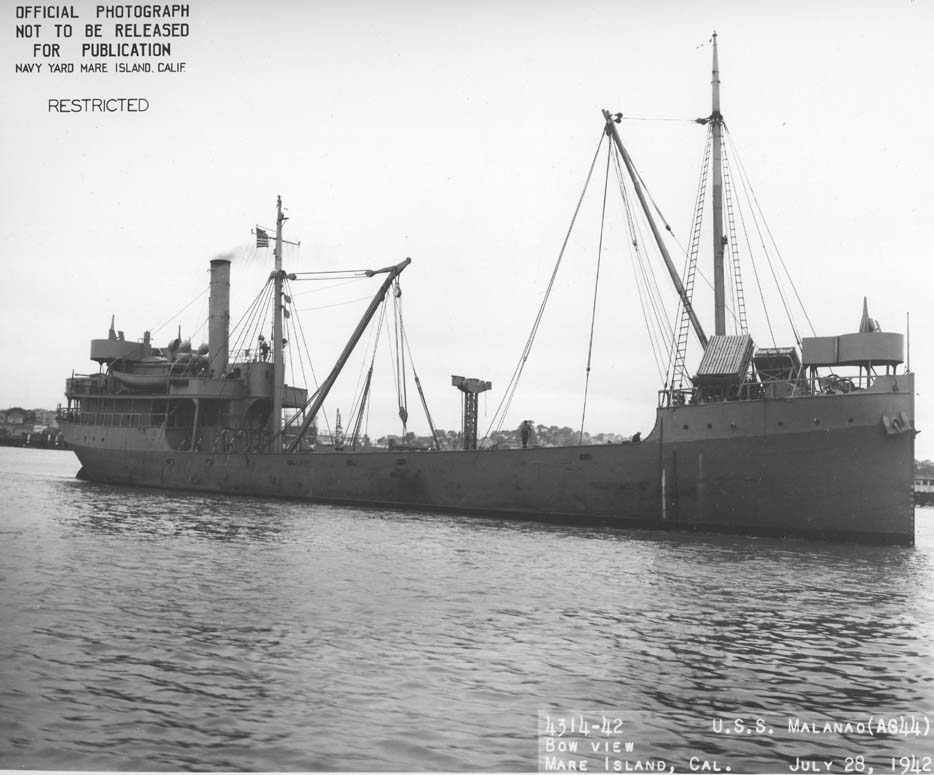

History

United States
- Name: Paraiso (1912-1923); Florence Olson (1923-1942); USS Malanao
- Namesake: Malanao: A small offshore island in the Sulu Sea, midway down the eastern coast of Palawan Island, Philippines
- Builder: Craig Shipbuilding Company, Long Beach, California
- Launched: 10 October 1912
- Acquired: by the Navy, 3 May 1942
- Commissioned: 3 June 1942 as USS Malanao (AG-44)
- Decommissioned: 18 February 1946 at Mare Island Navy Yard, Vallejo, California
- Refit: General Engineering & Drydock Company, Alameda, California
- Stricken: 12 March 1946
- Fate: Scrapped, 4 June 1946, at Mare Island Navy Yard

General characteristics
- Type: commercial cargo ship
- Displacement: 2,273 tons
- Length: 224 ft (68 m)
- Beam: 40 ft (12 m)
- Draft: 13 ft 10 in (4.22 m)
- Propulsion: 1 double expansion engine per shaft, 2 shafts
- Speed: 8 knots
- Complement: 45 officers and enlisted
- Armament: one single 3 in (76 mm) gun mounts, three 20 mm guns

USS Malanao (AG-44) was a commercial cargo ship acquired by the U.S. Navy during World War II. She was used to transport cargo in the South Pacific Ocean, and was decommissioned after the end of the war.

== Constructed in California ==
Malanao (AG 4 ) was built as SS Paraiso by the Craig Shipbuilding Company, Long Beach, California, launched October 10, 1912 and departed San Pedro on December 31 for San Francisco, San Francisco for San Pedro on January 13. The Craig yard launched the sister ship Grace Dollar in January 1913.

The ship was originally equipped with Craig-built double expansion engines of 13 inches and 30 inches diameters with 24 inch stroke, one engine for each of the two shafts driving the 2 screws. The engines were still on board in 1941.

Chartered by Pacific Coast Steamship Company of San Francisco, California, in 1914 for merchant service along the coast of northern California and Oregon.

She was subsequently purchased for $300,000 on September 27, 1917, by Oliver J. Olson & Company of San Francisco and renamed SS Florence Olson in June 1923.

Florence Olson was purchased by the Navy from her owner 3 May 1942; renamed Malanao 6 May 1942; converted for Navy use by General Engineering & Drydock Company, Alameda, California, 23 May 1942; and commissioned 3 June 1942.

== World War service ==
Following completion of conversion 6 July, Malanao carried a cargo of lumber to the Hawaiian Islands in August. Assigned to Service Squadron 8, Pacific Fleet Service Force, she operated during the remainder of the war among islands of the Hawaiian chain and to islands in Polynesia and the central Pacific Ocean.

Loaded with general cargo, construction equipment, and at times ammunition, in 1943 she completed 23 runs to Hawaiian ports as well as to American bases on Johnston, Palmyra, Christmas, Fanning, and Canton Islands. Shortly after the securing of Makin Island, in the Gilbert Islands, 23 November 1943, she arrived there with general cargo. She maintained her busy pace of operations in 1944 and included three round trips between Hawaii and Seattle, Washington.

During the first six months of 1945 she made 13 supply runs to island bases in the Hawaiian perimeter.

Malanao reached Pearl Harbor from her final cargo run 28 June 1945. She remained there until 28 September when she steamed to San Francisco, California, arriving 10 October.

== Post-war decommissioning ==
She decommissioned at Mare Island 18 February 1946, and her name was struck from the Navy List 12 March 1946. Her hull was scrapped at Mare Island 4 June 1946.
