= SS Drexel Victory =

American cargo ship

- Typical Victory ship

History

United States
- Name: Drexel Victory
- Namesake: Drexel University in Philadelphia
- Owner: War Shipping Administration
- Operator: Oliver J. Olson & Company
- Builder: Permanente Metals, Richmond, California
- Yard number: Richmond Shipyards #2
- Laid down: February 25, 1945
- Launched: April 7, 1945
- Acquired: May 2, 1945
- Fate: Sank on the Columbia Bar on January 20, 1947

General characteristics
- Class & type: VC2-S-AP3 Victory ship
- Tonnage: 7,612 GRT, 4,553 NRT
- Displacement: 15,200 tons
- Length: 455 ft (139 m)
- Beam: 62 ft (19 m)
- Draught: 28 ft (8.5 m)
- Installed power: 8,500 shp (6,300 kW)
- Propulsion: HP & LP turbines geared to a single 20.5-foot (6.2 m) propeller
- Speed: 16.5 knots (30.6 km/h; 19.0 mph)
- Boats & landing craft carried: 4 lifeboats
- Complement: 62 Merchant Marine and 28 US Naval Armed Guards
- Armament: 1 × 5-inch (127 mm)/38 caliber gun; 1 × 3-inch (76 mm)/50 caliber gun; 8 × 20 mm Oerlikon

SS Drexel Victory was a Victory-class cargo ship built during World War II. Drexel Victory (MCV-712), was a type VC2-S-AP2 Victory ship built by Permanente Metals Corporation, Yard 2, of Richmond, California under the Emergency Shipbuilding program. The Maritime Administration cargo ship was the 744th Victory ship. Her keel was laid on February 25, 1945. The ship was christened on May 2, 1945. The ship was named in honor of Drexel University in Philadelphia, one of 150 educational institutions that had Victory ships named after them.

Victory ships were designed to replace the earlier Liberty ships. Liberty ships were designed to be used just for World War II. Victory ships were designed to last longer and serve the US Navy after the war. The Victory ship differed from a Liberty ship in that they were: faster, longer and wider, taller, a thinner stack set farther toward the superstructure and had a long raised forecastle.

Drexel Victory had difficulty from the start, on May 2, 1945, the not yet complete Drexel Victory side-swiped the waterfront loading dock of the Ford plant as she was being moved by tugboats from Kaiser's Richmond shipyard no. 2. The damage stopped work at the Richmond Tank Depot as the gantry crane that served the Ford dock was damaged. As the gantry crane fell it damaged the brick wall of the Ford Motor Company Assembly Plant. The wall fell on an interior overhead crane. The falling debris damaged five military vehicles near the crane and wall.

Drexel Victory did not see combat action as the war was near the end by the time she was completed. She was laid down on February 25, 1945, during the time World War II was still active in the Pacific War. But, with the surrender of Japan on 15 August 1945, she was not needed to help with the bloody invasion of Japan's mainland. She was operated by Oliver J. Olson & Company as a United States Merchant Marine ship and helped bring supplies home and take supplies to help war-torn Pacific nations under the Marshall Plan.

On September 26, 1946, Drexel Victory ran aground in Tokyo Bay near Fort No. 2. Protector helped pull Drexel Victory free.

Drexel Victory departed Portland, Oregon, for Yokohama, Japan on January 20, 1947. As part of Marshall Plan she was loaded with more than 5,000 tons of grain. As she streamed down the Columbia River, she struck the Columbia Bar hard and began breaking up between in her middle, between cargo holds 4 and 5. Captain Canute Rommerdahl was operating the ship for Olson & Company under the U.S. Maritime Commission. What the Drexel Victory hit is still a mystery as the charts for the area she hit recorded the channel at 57 feet deep. Drexel Victory water line was only at a depth of 30 feet. However, shifting sand bars are known to happen anytime. A large swell could have put her on a bar. She may have struck a submerged shipwreck. She was refloated and towed to sea by USCGC Onondaga, but she sank five miles (8.0 km) from Cape Disappointment due west of buoy #6. She lays at about 210 feet (64 m) under the surface water at Latitude: 46.31232. Longitude: -124.1596. Drexel Victory was abandoned without loss of life in the fog and darkness. The US Coast Guard reported the ship sank at 3:35 am. The lifeboats were lowered, and the crew of 30 loaded boarded as the ship started to break up. The US Coast Guard picked up the crew two hours later with the ship USCGC Triumph. The crew and lifeboats were found near SS Columbia by a river pilot schooner. Columbia river pilots ship program started in 1846, to help ships safety cross the treacherous Columbia River Bar. The Liberty ship Joseph Gale picked up some of the crew before the US Coast Guard ship arrived.
