= Samuel Gibbs French =

Confederate army major general (1818–1910)

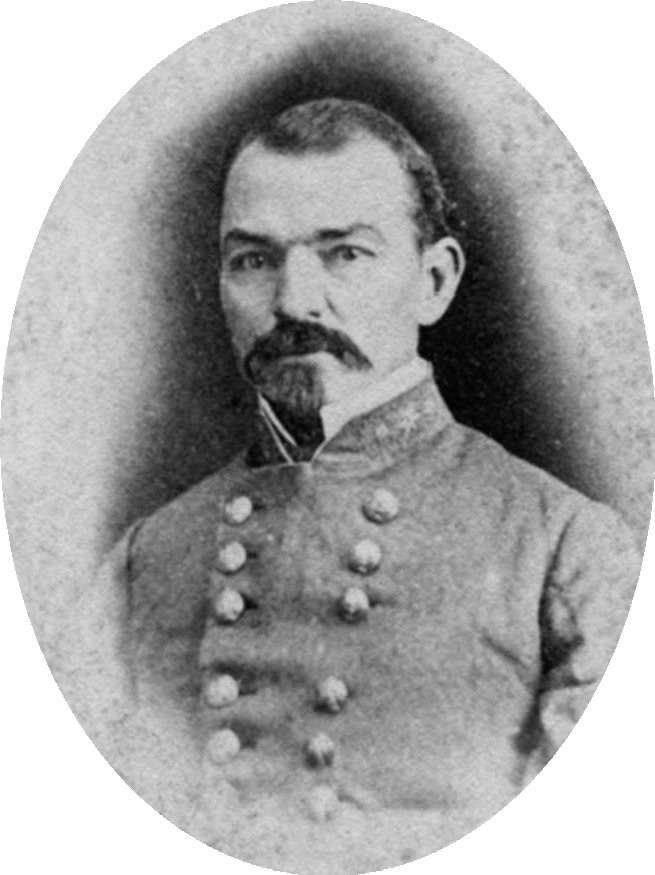
- Born: November 22, 1818; Mullica Hill, New Jersey, U.S.
- Died: April 20, 1910 (aged 91); Florala, Alabama, U.S.
- Burial place: St. John's cemetery, Pensacola, Florida, U.S.
- Military career
- Allegiance: United States; Confederate States of America
- Branch: U.S. Army; Confederate States Army
- Service years: 1843–1856 (USA); 1861–1865 (CSA)
- Rank: Captain (USA); Major General (CSA)
- Commands: Assistant Quartermaster in the general staff of the Army (USA); Chief of ordnance of the Army of Mississippi (CSA); Department of North Carolina and Southern Virginia (CSA); Divisional Commander of the Army of Tennessee (CSA)
- Conflicts: Mexican–American War; Battle of Palo Alto; Battle of Resaca de la Palma; Battle of Monterrey; Battle of Buena Vista; American Civil War; Siege of Suffolk; Battle of Suffolk (Hill's Point); Atlanta campaign; Battle of Kennesaw Mountain; Franklin-Nashville campaign; Battle of Allatoona; Second Battle of Tilton; Battle of Franklin
- Other work: Planter and author

Samuel Gibbs French (November 22, 1818 – April 20, 1910) was an American military officer from New Jersey. He graduated from the United States Military Academy in 1843, served as a captain in the U.S. Army in the Mexican-American War, and was wounded at the Battle of Buena Vista. In 1856, he resigned his commission to manage a plantation in Mississippi he obtained through marriage.

At the start of the American Civil War, he sided with the Confederacy, was commissioned lieutenant colonel, promoted to brigadier general and major general. He served in the Eastern Theater and commanded the Department of North Carolina and Southern Virginia. He was transferred to the Western Theater and commanded a division in the Army of Tennessee during the attempt to relieve the Siege of Vicksburg, the Atlanta campaign and the Franklin-Nashville campaign. Over the course of his military career, he served in thirty-five engagements.

In 1901, he published his autobiography Two Wars: an Autobiography of Gen. Samuel G. French, An Officer in the Armies of the United States and the Confederate States, A Graduate from the U.S. Military Academy, West Point 1843.

== Early life and education ==
French was born on November 28, 1818 near Mullica Hill, New Jersey, the second son of Samuel and Rebecca (Clark) French. He spent his childhood on the family farm and was educated at the Harmony School. He attended the Burlington Academy preparatory school in Burlington, New Jersey and was accepted to the United States Military Academy on March 22, 1839. In 1843, French graduated from the United States Military Academy along with several future Civil War generals including Christopher C. Augur, William B. Franklin, Franklin Gardner, Ulysses S. Grant, Charles Smith Hamilton, Henry M. Judah, John J. Peck, Joseph J. Reynolds, Roswell Ripley and Frederick Steele. He was given the brevet rank of second lieutenant and assigned to the 3rd U.S. Artillery. He was stationed in Fort Macon, North Carolina, Washington, D.C., West Point and Fort McHenry in Baltimore.

== Mexican-American War ==
In August, 1845, he sailed from Baltimore with Major Samuel Ringgold's battery of horse artillery to join General Zachary Taylor and the Army of Occupation in Aransas Pass, Texas.

He fought at the Battle of Palo Alto and received praise for his actions at the Battle of Resaca de la Palma. On June 18, 1846, he was promoted to second lieutenant. During the Battle of Monterrey, he commanded an artillery battery and was brevetted first lieutenant on September 23, 1846. He was wounded in the thigh by a musket ball during the Battle of Buena Vista but continued to lead his men in combat. He received a promotion to brevet captain and was sent home to recuperate.

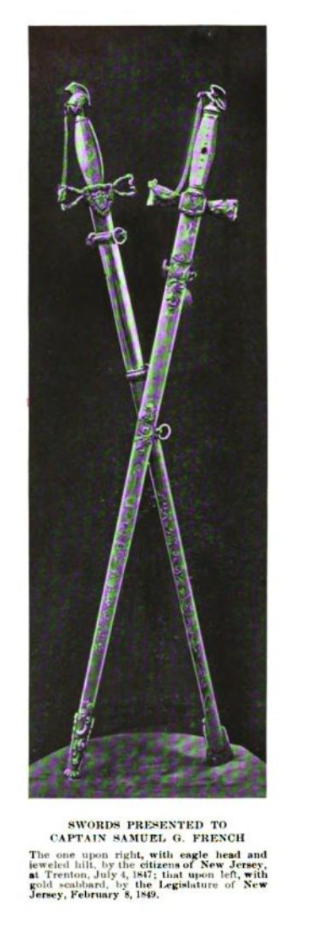
Two ceremonial swords were given to French by the citizens and Legislature of New Jersey in recognition of his service in the Mexican American War.

On July 4, 1847, he was presented a ceremonial sword from the citizens of New Jersey which contained the inscription "for distinguished service in the battles of Palo Alo, Resaca de la Palma and Buena Vista". On February 9, 1849, he was presented on resolution from the New Jersey Legislature a second sword with the inscription "For brave and gallant conduct displayed in the battles of Palo Alto, Resaca de la Palma, and Monterrey. Subsequently distinguished at Buena Vista, and promoted to the rank of Captain".

He became an original member of the Aztec Club of 1847. He was promoted to full captain on January 12, 1848, and commissioned as assistant quartermaster in the general staff of the army working under his former classmate, Rufus Ingalls. He led expeditions in 1849 and 1851 to El Paso and was assigned to Fort Smith, Arkansas at his request in 1854. He resigned his commission in May, 1856. He acquired a plantation through his marriage to Eliza Matilda Roberts along Deer Creek near Greenville, Mississippi, and left the army to manage it.

== American Civil War ==
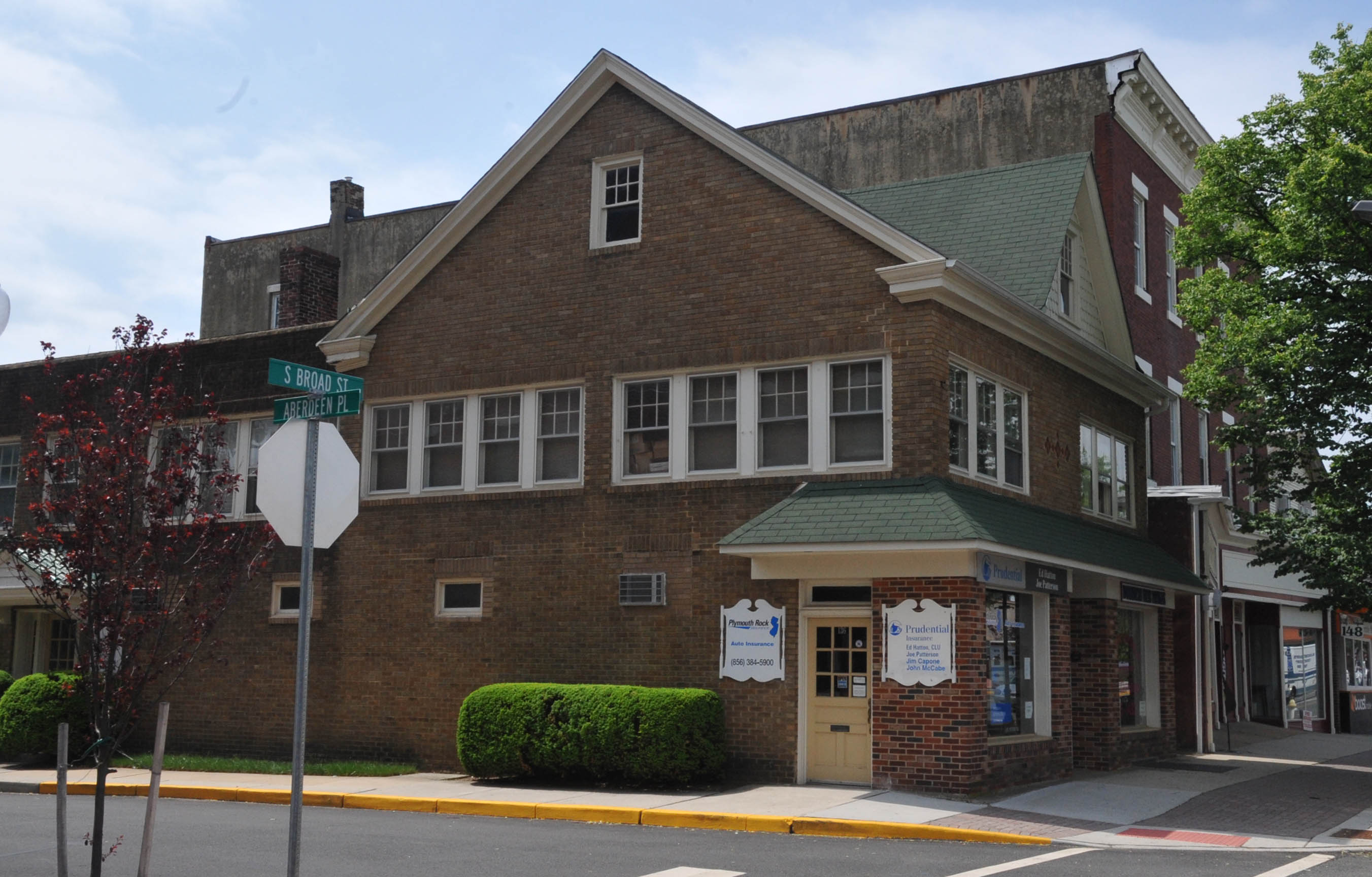
Woodbury, New Jersey residents protested in front of and stormed French's summer house when they learned of his secession to the Confederacy.

At the start of the Civil War, French joined the Confederacy. Residents of his home state of New Jersey were so incensed by his decision that they protested in front of his summer home in Woodbury, New Jersey, hanged him in effigy, stormed the house and threw items from his house into the street.

French was made a lieutenant colonel and chief of ordnance of the Army of Mississippi on February 12, 1861; and brigadier general in the provisional army of the Confederate States of America on October 23, 1861. He was assigned to the defense of the Potomac River near Evansport, Virginia. He built Camp French near Quantico, Virginia.

From July 21, 1862, to June, 1863, he commanded the Department of North Carolina and Southern Virginia. He oversaw improvements to Fort Fisher and built Fort St. Philips (later renamed Fort Anderson) in Brunswick Town, North Carolina to protect Wilmington, North Carolina.

On October 22, 1862, French was promoted major general with seniority backdated to August 31. He commanded a brigade and a division under Major General Daniel Harvey Hill at Petersburg, Virginia. He built the fortifications around Petersburg that were regarded as a model of defensive warfare and held off the Army of the Potomac for nine months. He led attacks against Harrison's Landing on July 4, 1862, and Suffolk, Virginia on September 22, 1862. In the first letter to French after the Civil War, former West Point classmate, Union General Rufus Ingalls wrote to French about the Harrison's Landing bombardment; "You don't know, dear Sam, how near you came to killing me that night, which, had it happened, would have been a great sorrow to you." In April 1863, French led a division under Lieutenant General James Longstreet in the Siege of Suffolk.

French's troops were at the Battle of Suffolk (Hill's Point), but he declined to attack Fort Huger since he believed the Union commander would quickly vacate the fort since he had no military support. Longstreet censured French's actions at Suffolk and tried to have him removed from command but Jefferson Davis vetoed the action. French was on medical leave in Columbus, Georgia, and Warm Springs, Arkansas, due to the lingering effects of dysentery from August 4 to October 1863.

French moved to the Western Theater and commanded a division in Jackson, Mississippi during General Joseph E. Johnston's Jackson Expedition to relieve the Siege of Vicksburg. Johnston initially expressed concern to Jefferson Davis that French's Northern heritage would make it difficult for the troops to accept him. Davis dismissed this concern and reminded Johnston that French was a wealthy plantation owner in Mississippi and served in the state militia after secession. French served under Lieutenant General Leonidas Polk in Mississippi during the retreat from Jackson from December 1863 to May 1864. He was officially attached to the Army of Tennessee on May 18, 1864. He fought in the Atlanta campaign including the Battle of Kennesaw Mountain from May to September 1864.

French served in the Franklin–Nashville Campaign. After Atlanta capitulated on October 5, 1864, Hood ordered French and his division to capture Altoona Pass and break the line of communications for Sherman's army. At the Battle of Allatoona, French was unable to capture the pass, which was guarded by a federal garrison under Brigadier General John M. Corse. The fierce fighting concluded when federal reinforcements arrived, forcing French's troops to retreat to New Hope Church and rejoin the Army of Tennessee. Two of French's brigades suffered enormous losses in the Battle of Franklin with more than 1/3 of the troops being killed, wounded or missing. French suffered an eye infection that rendered him nearly blind and he relinquished command to Claudius W. Sears before the Battle of Nashville. He returned home to recuperate from December 16, 1864, to February 1865. He returned to active service and commanded forces in the defense of Mobile, Alabama.

== Postbellum life ==
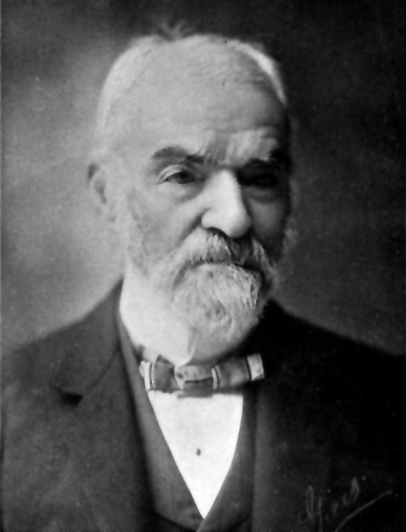
Photo of French from his autobiography, published in 1901

He surrendered near Mobile, Alabama and in April, 1865, French was paroled at Columbus, Georgia. His service in both the Mexican-American War and the Civil War resulted in his participation in thirty-five combat engagements. He returned to his plantation in Mississippi and worked for several years as Mississippi State levee commissioner. He lived for a year in Woodbury, New Jersey when he worked as president of a railroad company. He lived in Columbus, Georgia for several years and moved to Winter Park, Florida in 1881 after investing in orange groves. In 1895, he moved to Pensacola, Florida to live near his daughter.

In 1898, at the age of 79, he volunteered to serve in the Spanish-American War but his offer was refused by President William McKinley.

In 1901, he published his memoirs, Two Wars. In his book, he criticized Governor John J. Pettus and Confederate generals William J. Hardee, Hood and Leonidas Polk. French placed the blame for the Civil War on the greed of the North. He believed that the North should have compensated Southern states for their slaves when slavery was abolished. He believed that one day, impartial historians would vindicate the South.

French was married to his first wife, Eliza Matilda Roberts of Mississippi, on April 26, 1853. Together they had a daughter and a son who died in childbirth along with Eliza on June 13, 1857. French was married again to Mary Fontaine Abercrombie of Alabama on 12 January 1865; she died on 16 May 1900 at Atlanta, Georgia. Together they had three children.

== Death and legacy ==
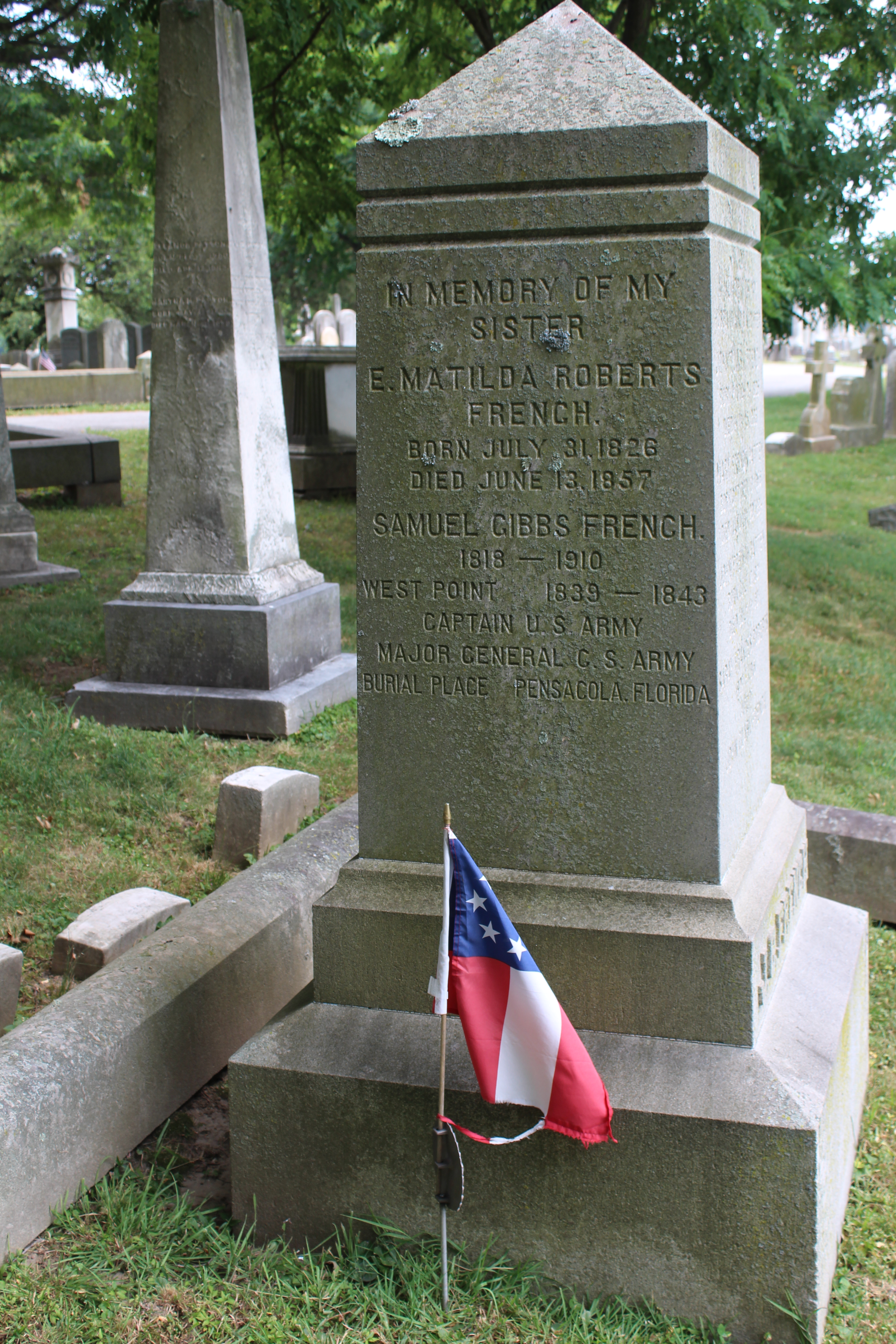
Samuel Gibbs French cenotaph in Laurel Hill Cemetery, Philadelphia, Pennsylvania

French died in Florala, Alabama on April 20, 1910 while visiting his son and was interred at St. John's Cemetery in Pensacola. For the burial, his body was wrapped in both the American and the Confederate flags. His family placed a cenotaph for him in the family plot in Laurel Hill Cemetery in Philadelphia, Pennsylvania.

During the Civil War, Fort French near Wilmington, North Carolina, and Camp French near Quantico, Virginia, were named in his honor.

During World War II, the Liberty ship SS Samuel G. French was built in Panama City, Florida, and named in his honor.

There is a bust and marker of French in the National Military Park, Vicksburg, Mississippi.

== Bibliography ==
- Two Wars: An Autobiography of Gen. Samuel G. French, An Officer in the Armies of the United States and the Confederate States, A Graduate from the U.S. Military Academy, West Point 1843. Nashville: Confederate Veteran, 1901.

== See also ==
- List of American Civil War generals (Confederate)
