= USS Gemini (AP-75) =

Stratford-class transport ship of the United States Navy

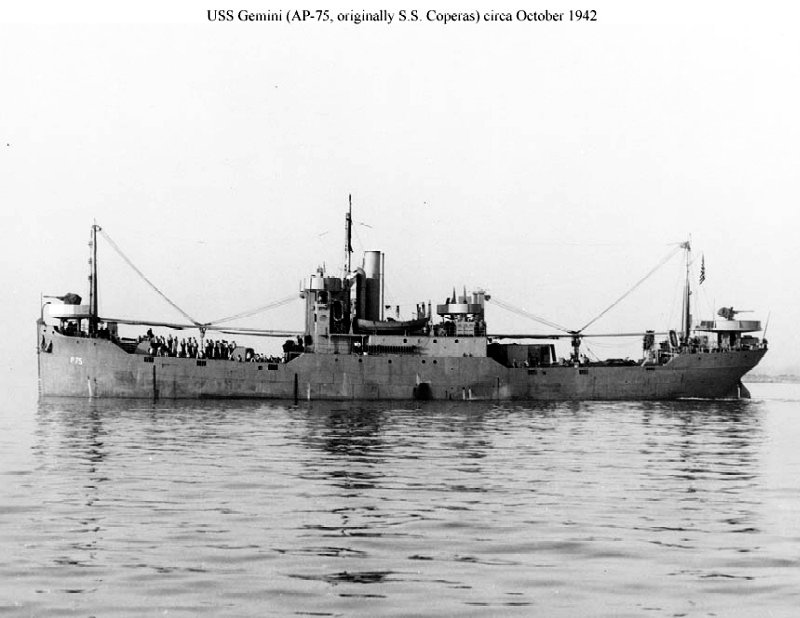

History

United States
- Name: USS Gemini
- Laid down: as SS Coperas
- Launched: 2 November 1918
- Completed: April 1919
- Acquired: 27 September 1941
- Commissioned: 4 August 1942
- Decommissioned: 8 April 1946
- Stricken: date unknown
- Fate: Sold, date unknown

General characteristics
- Displacement: 3,555 t. (lim.)
- Length: 261 ft (80 m)
- Beam: 43 ft 6 in (13.26 m)
- Draught: 15 ft 9 in (4.80 m) (lim.)
- Propulsion: steam turbine
- Speed: 8.5 kts.
- Complement: 365
- Armament: two single 3 in (76 mm) dual purpose gun mounts

USS Gemini (AG-38/AK-52/AP-75) was a Stratford-class transport commissioned by the U.S. Navy for service in World War II. She was responsible for delivering troops and equipment to locations in the war zone.

Gemini (AP-75) a lake-type freighter, was built as SS Coperas by the Manitowoc Shipbuilding Company of Manitowoc, Wisconsin. Subsequently renamed Aetna and then Saginaw around 1937 while in merchant service, she was acquired by the Navy 27 September 1941. Originally designated USS Matinicus (AG-38), she was reclassified AK-52 7 January 1942 while undergoing conversion at Bethlehem Steel Company, Boston, Massachusetts. Commissioned as USS Matinicus (AK-52) 4 August 1942, she was redesignated and renamed USS Gemini (AP-75) 15 August 1942.

== World War II service ==
Gemini sailed 16 August for New York to load troops and sortied 24 October with convoy SC 107 bound for Ireland and United Kingdom ports.

This, her first voyage, was also the most difficult, for the convoy ran into German submarine wolfpacks in mid-Atlantic and from 1 to 4 November no less than fifteen ships, nearly half the convoy, were torpedoed and sunk in a running battle. Gemini arrived safely at Reykjavík, Iceland, and spent the next 10 months as a transport for troops and cargo between Icelandic ports.

The ship put in at Boston 3 September 1943 for overhaul, and then embarked troops at New York, departing 9 October bound for the west coast via Panama. After touching at San Pedro, California, for repairs, she reached Honolulu 11 December and commenced duty as an inter-island transport in Hawaiian waters.

In July 1944 Gemini shifted her operations to the Marshalls and Gilberts, carrying men and cargo to and from Kwajalein, Apamama, Tarawa, Makin, Majuro, Roi Namur, and Eniwetok. She continued these essential transport duties in support of the allied advance until 1 June 1945 when she got underway for San Francisco, California, via Pearl Harbor. Gemini remained in drydock at San Francisco until the end of the war.

== After hostilities ==
Gemini sailed 28 August 1945 for the Pacific Ocean again, resuming her earlier transport runs in the Marshalls-Gilberts area and continuing the assignments until her return to San Francisco. She decommissioned at Oakland, California, 8 April 1946 and was turned over to the Maritime Commission 10 September 1946. Subsequently sold to Oly Fenno S.S. Co. Lid., she operated under Finnish papers as Ramsdal out of Abo, Finland.

== Military awards and honors ==
Her crew was eligible for the following medals:

- American Campaign Medal
- European-African-Middle Eastern Campaign Medal
- Asiatic-Pacific Campaign Medal
- World War II Victory Medal
- Navy Occupation Service Medal (with Asia clasp)

== See also ==
- SS Cynthia Olson sister ship
- USS Stratford (AP-41) sister ship
