= Stratford High School =

Stratford High School may refer to:

== Schools in the United States ==
- Stratford High School (Connecticut), Stratford, Connecticut
- Stratford High School (Houston), Houston, Texas
- Stratford High School (Stratford, Texas)
- Stratford High School (South Carolina), Goose Creek, South Carolina
- Stratford High School (Tennessee), Nashville, Tennessee
- Stratford High School (Wisconsin), Stratford, Wisconsin

== Other schools ==
- Stratford High School, New Zealand, in Stratford, New Zealand
- Stratford-upon-Avon School, in Stratford-upon-Avon, England

== See also ==
- Stratford Central Secondary School, in Stratford, Ontario, Canada
- Stratford-upon-Avon College, in Stratford-upon-Avon, England
- Stratford School (disambiguation)
