= Stratford House =

Stratford House may refer to:

- Stratford House (London), a Grade I listed house in Stratford Place, Westminster
- Stratford House (Birmingham), a Grade II* listed house in the Highgate area of Birmingham, England
- Stratford House (Stony Stratford), a Grade II listed house in Stony Stratford, Milton Keynes, built in the early 18th century.
- Stratford House (Leeds), a Grade II listed house in Leeds, built in the early 19th century, now home to the Serbian National Centre Social Club
- Stratford House (Dumfries and Galloway), a Category C listed house built in the early 19th century on Academy Road, Moffat, Dumfries and Galloway in Scotland
