= Stratford-class transport =

World War II American naval vessel class

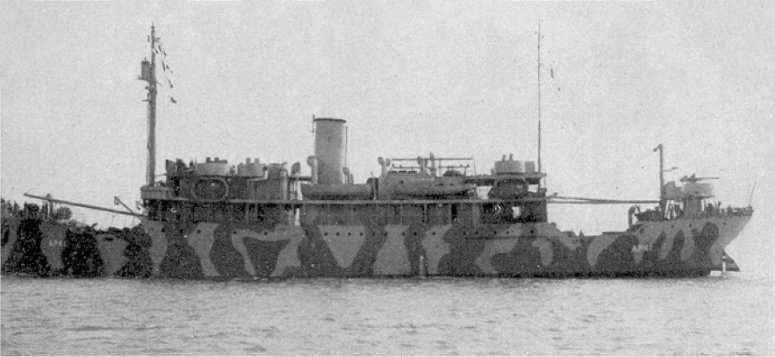
- USS Stratford, lead ship of the Stratford class

Class overview
- Builders: Manitowoc Shipbuilding Company
- Built: 1917-?
- In commission: 25 Aug 1941 – 17 Apr 1946
- Completed: 2

General characteristics
- Class & type: Stratford class transport
- Displacement: 2,300 (lt) 3,640 (fl)
- Length: 261 ft (80 m)
- Beam: 43 ft 6 in (13.3 m)
- Draft: 15 ft 7 in (4.7 m)
- Propulsion: Steam turbine, single screw
- Speed: 8.5-9.6 knots
- Complement: 132 (Stratford), 365 (Gemini)
- Armament: Stratford: 1 × single 3"/50 cal dual-purpose gun mount; 3 × single 40 mm AA gun mounts; Gemini: 2 × single 3"/50 dual-purpose gun mounts

The Stratford class transport was a class of transport ship that served with the United States Navy during World War II. Their purpose was to transport soldiers to overseas service.

== History ==
There were only two Stratford class vessels, both built by the Manitowoc Shipbuilding Company. They were both apparently built for commercial service on the Great Lakes as freighters in about 1918, and operated as commercial vessels between the wars.

Shortly before America's entry into World War II, two ships were requisitioned by the US Navy. The first ship, USS Stratford, was commissioned in August 1941 and the second, USS Gemini, in August 1942. Initially designated as cargo ships (AK), they were both converted to transports (AP) shortly after commission and hence became the Stratford-class transports.

Both ships were initially assigned to convoy duty to Iceland in 1942, and then later took part in operations against the Japanese in the Pacific until the end of the war. Both were decommissioned in 1946. Gemini subsequently returned to commercial service, in Norway. Stratford was scrapped in 1956.
