= Stratford (given name) =

Stratford is a masculine given name borne by:

- Stratford Caldecott (1953–2014), British Catholic author, editor, publisher and blogger
- Stratford Canning, 1st Viscount Stratford de Redcliffe (1786–1880), British diplomat
- Stratford Johns (1925–2002), British actor
