= Japanese submarine I-26 =

Imperial Japanese Navy B1 type submarine

- I-26 on sea trials off Hiroshima Bay, October 1941.

History

Empire of Japan
- Name: Submarine No. 139
- Builder: Kure Naval Arsenal, Kure, Japan
- Laid down: 7 June 1939
- Launched: 10 April 1940
- Renamed: I-27 on 10 April 1940; I-26 on 1 November 1941
- Completed: 6 November 1941
- Commissioned: 6 November 1941
- Fate: Sunk 17 November 1944
- Stricken: 10 March 1945

General characteristics
- Class & type: Type B1 submarine
- Displacement: 2,584 tons surfaced; 3,654 tons submerged
- Length: 108.7 m (356 ft 8 in)
- Beam: 9.3 m (30 ft 6 in)
- Draft: 5.1 m (16 ft 9 in)
- Propulsion: 2 diesels: 12,400 hp (9,247 kW); electric motors: 2,000 hp (1,491 kW)
- Speed: 23.5 knots (43.5 km/h; 27.0 mph) surfaced; 8 knots (15 km/h; 9.2 mph) submerged
- Range: 14,000 nautical miles (26,000 km; 16,000 mi) at 16 knots (30 km/h; 18 mph)
- Test depth: 100 m (328 ft)
- Complement: 94 officers and men
- Armament: 6 × 533 mm torpedo tubes fwd; (17 torpedoes); 1 × 14 cm/40 11th Year Type naval gun
- Aircraft carried: one seaplane

I-26 was an Imperial Japanese Navy B1 type submarine commissioned in 1941. She saw service in the Pacific War theatre of World War II, patrolling off the West Coast of Canada and the United States, the east coast of Australia, and Fiji and in the Indian Ocean and taking part in Operation K, preparatory operations for the Aleutian Islands campaign, and the Guadalcanal campaign, the Marianas campaign, and the Battle of Leyte Gulf. She was the first Japanese submarine to sink an American merchant ship in the war, sank the first ship lost off the coast of State of Washington during the war, badly damaged the aircraft carrier USS Saratoga, most notably helped to sink the light cruiser USS Juneau, and was the third-highest-scoring Japanese submarine of World War II in terms of shipping tonnage sunk. Her bombardment of Vancouver Island in 1942 was the first foreign attack on Canadian soil since 1870. In 1944, I-26′s crew committed war crimes in attacking the survivors of a ship she sank. She was sunk in November 1944 during her ninth war patrol.

== Construction and commissioning ==
Built by the Kure Naval Arsenal at Kure, Japan, I-26 was laid down on 7 June 1939 as Submarine No. 139. She was launched on 10 April 1940 and provisionally numbered I-27 that day, but she was renumbered I-26 on 1 November 1941. She was completed and commissioned on 6 November 1941.

== Service history ==
=== Pre-World War II ===
On the day of her commissioning, I-26 was attached to the Yokosuka Naval District and assigned to Submarine Division 4 in Submarine Squadron 1 in the 6th Fleet, a component of the Combined Fleet. She departed immediately for work-ups in the Seto Inland Sea.

On 10 November 1941, as the Japanese armed forces began to deploy for the offensive that would begin the Pacific campaign of World War II, I-26 was assigned to the 6th Fleet Reconnaissance Unit and received orders to conduct a prewar reconnaissance of the Aleutian Islands area. She arrived at Yokosuka, Japan, on 12 November 1941, and began preparations for the mission, which called for I-26 to operate at the limits of her endurance. Rather than embark a floatplane, her crew filled her hangar with food because of a lack of space below for sufficient provisions. With modern Type 95 torpedoes in short supply, she instead loaded only ten old 6th Year Type torpedoes, seven fewer torpedoes than she was designed to carry.

I-26 departed Yokosuka at 15:00 on 19 November 1941 and set course for the Aleutians with orders to reconnoiter American naval bases there and report on the United States Navy presence in the area to the commander-in-chief of the Combined Fleet, Admiral Isoroku Yamamoto, by 5 December 1941, then proceed to a patrol area in the Pacific Ocean halfway between San Francisco, California, and Hawaii to observe and report any American reinforcements headed toward Hawaii from the United States West Coast. When she was 600 nautical miles (1,100 km; 690 mi) from the Aleutians, she began a routine of operating submerged by day and on the surface only at night. After arriving in the Aleutians, she conducted a periscope reconnaissance of Attu, Kiska, and Adak between 26 and 28 November 1941 and of Dutch Harbor on Amaknak Island off Unalaska on 29 November. Finding no American naval presence in any of these areas, she headed for her Pacific patrol area, centered around 28°00′N 141°30′W. She received the message "Climb Mount Niitaka 1208" (Japanese: Niitakayama nobore 1208) from the Combined Fleet on 2 December 1941, indicating that war with the Allies would commence with the attack on Pearl Harbor on 8 December 1941 Japan time, which was on 7 December 1941 on the other side of the International Date Line in both Hawaii and I-26′s patrol area.

When 300 nautical miles (560 km; 350 mi) off San Francisco on 6 December 1941, I-26 sighted the 2,140-gross register ton cargo ship SS Cynthia Olson, a lumber steamer under charter to the United States Army making 10 knots (19 km/h; 12 mph) and carrying a cargo of U.S. Army supplies from Tacoma, Washington, to Honolulu, Hawaii. Under orders not to commence hostilities until 03:30 on 8 December Japan time — the anticipated time of the attack on Pearl Harbor, which was 08:00 on 7 December Hawaii time and 09:00 local time on 7 December in I-26′s patrol area — I-26 determined Cynthia Olson′s course and speed, pursued her until dark, then surfaced and moved ahead of her so as to be in position to attack her when hostilities began the next morning.

=== First war patrol ===
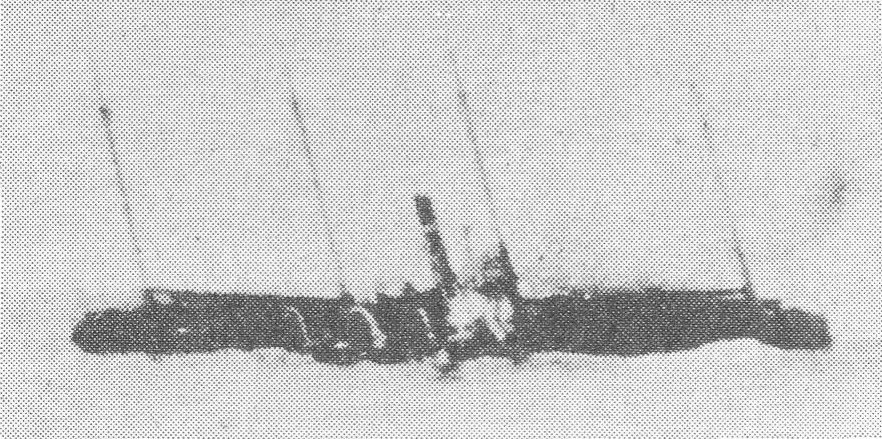
SS Cynthia Olson sinking on 7 December 1941, photographed by the gunnery officer of I-26.

At dawn on 7 December 1941, I-26 found Cynthia Olson exactly where the submarine's crew expected to find her along her projected course. At 09:00 local time on 7 December, which was 08:00 on 7 December in Hawaii and 03:30 on 8 December in Japan and was only minutes after the attack on Pearl Harbor began, I-26 determined Cynthia Olson′s nationality, surfaced near her, and fired a warning shot. Cynthia Olson′s crew transmitted an SOS and abandoned ship in two lifeboats. I-26 fired 18 rounds from her aft 140-millimeter (5.5 in) gun from a range of 1,000 yards (910 m) at Cynthia Olson, setting her ablaze. Twenty minutes after opening fire, she received the message Tora! Tora! Tora! ("Tiger! Tiger! Tiger!"), indicating that the Pearl Harbor attack had achieved complete surprise. She submerged and fired a torpedo at Cynthia Olson from a range of 450 yards (410 m), but it missed her astern because she still was underway. I-26 surfaced again and resumed 140-millimeter (5.5 in) fire, firing 29 more rounds over the next two hours before departing the area when Cynthia Olson finally rolled onto her side in a sinking condition some five hours after I-26 first attacked her. Cynthia Olson sank later on 7 December 900 nautical miles (1,700 km; 1,000 mi) northeast of Hawaii at 33°42′N 145°29′W, the first American merchant ship lost after the entry of the United States into the war and the first American merchant ship sunk by a Japanese submarine. The American ocean liner SS Lurline picked up Cynthia Olson′s SOS from a considerable distance away and on 8 December the Japanese submarine I-19 came across her lifeboats and provided her survivors — 33 crewmen and two U.S. Army passengers — with food, but after that they were never seen or heard from again.

After the submarine I-6 reported sighting a Lexington-class aircraft carrier and two cruisers steaming east-northeast of Oahu on 9 December 1941, the commander of the 6th Fleet, Vice Admiral Mitsumi Shimizu, aboard his flagship, the light cruiser Katori at Kwajalein Atoll in the Marshall Islands, ordered I-26 and all the other submarines of Submarine Squadron 1 except for those of the Special Attack Force serving as the mother ships for midget submarines to search for the ships. The search was unsuccessful.

On 14 December 1941, I-26 was among a number of submarines ordered to proceed to the U.S. West Coast to attack shipping. The same day, Japanese Imperial General Headquarters ordered the submarines to bombard the U.S. West Coast, and Vice Admiral Shimizu instructed I-26 and the submarines I-9, I-10, I-15, I-17, I-19, I-21, I-23, and I-25 each to fire 30 rounds on the evening of 25 December, with the commander of Submarine Squadron 1, Rear Admiral Tsutomu Sato aboard his flagship I-9, in overall command of the bombardment. I-26 arrived in her assigned patrol area in the Strait of Juan de Fuca off Cape Flattery, Washington, near Seattle on 20 December 1941 and sighted several merchant ships, but could not make any attacks due to heavy seas and poor visibility. On 22 December, Admiral Yamamoto postponed the bombardment from 25 to 27 December, and on 27 December Rear Admiral Sato cancelled it entirely because of the frequency of coastal air and surface patrols and because the submarines tasked with carrying it out were very low on fuel. I-26 concluded her patrol with her arrival at Kwajalein on 11 January 1942 after 54 days at sea.

=== January–February 1942 ===
While at Kwajalein, I-26 fueled and loaded provisions in company with I-15, I-17, and I-23. She also loaded modern Type 95 torpedoes for the first time in the war. One source asserts that she made a voyage to Yokosuka and back to Kwajalein during January 1942 for new equipment and training. While she was at Kwajalein, 46 U.S. Navy aircraft from the aircraft carrier USS Enterprise raided Kwajalein and Wotje Atoll on 1 February 1942, sinking a transport, wounding Vice Admiral Shimizu and damaging a number of ships, including Shimizu's flagship Katori, the auxiliary submarine tender Yasukuni Maru, and I-23. Moored alongside I-23, I-26 attempted to open fire on the attacking planes with her 25-millimeter antiaircraft gun, but it malfunctioned, and instead she submerged and avoided damage. Two hours after the raid, the 6th Fleet ordered I-9, I-15, I-17, I-19, I-23, I-25, I-26, and the submarines Ro-61 and Ro-62 to find and attack Enterprise, but they had no success.

=== Operation K ===
On 3 February 1942, I-15, I-19, I-23, and I-26 were recalled to Kwajalein, and on 5 February they and I-9 were selected to participate in Operation K, which called for two Imperial Japanese Navy Kawanishi H8K1 (Allied reporting name "Emily") flying boats to fly from Wotje, stop at the French Frigate Shoals in the Northwestern Hawaiian Islands 500 nautical miles (930 km; 580 mi) west-northwest of Oahu to refuel from submarines, then fly to Oahu to bomb Honolulu before returning to Wotje. I-9 was to take station halfway between Wotje and the French Frigate Shoals to act as a radio beacon for the aircraft, I-23 was to operate 10 nautical miles (19 km; 12 mi) south of Pearl Harbor to provide weather reports and rescue the crews of any aircraft that were shot down, and I-15, I-19, and I-26 were to refuel the planes.

On 14 February 1942, I-15, I-19, and I-26 each had six fuel tanks for aviation gasoline installed in their hangars, and the three submarines departed Kwajalein on 20 February 1942 bound for the French Frigate Shoals. With I-26 remaining offshore in reserve, I-15 and I-19 arrived at French Frigate Shoals on 4 March 1942, where the two flying boats landed that evening. After refueling they took off again, made the seven-hour flight to Honolulu, dropped their bombs early on 5 March without achieving anything of importance, and returned to the Marshall Islands safely. With the operation complete, I-26 made for Yokosuka, Japan, where she arrived on 21 March 1942 and began repairs.

=== March–May 1942 ===
While I-26 was in Drydock No. 5 at Yokosuka, 16 United States Army Air Forces B-25 Mitchell medium bombers launched from the aircraft carrier USS Hornet struck targets in Japan on 18 April 1942 in the Doolittle Raid. Some of I-26′s crew aboard her and ashore witnessed part of the raid, and one B-25 bombed and damaged the light aircraft carrier Ryūhō, which was undergoing conversion from the submarine tender Taigei in the adjacent Drydock No. 4. I-26 suffered no damage or casualties in the raid.

=== Second war patrol ===
As Japan made preparations to begin the Aleutian Islands campaign with landings on Attu and Kiska in the Aleutian Islands and an air strike on Dutch Harbor, I-26 got underway from Yokosuka at 13:00 on 16 May 1942 to begin her second war patrol, ordered to reconnoiter the Kodiak Island area off the coast of the Territory of Alaska and then raid shipping off Seattle. While she was at sea, she was reassigned to the Northern Force. She conducted a reconnaissance of Kodiak Island on 24 May 1942 and of Chirikof Island and Sitkanak Island on 26 May 1942. On 27 May 1942, I-25 launched a Yokosuka E14Y1 (Allied reporting name "Glen") floatplane for a reconnaissance flight over Dutch Harbor, and I-26, which had no aircraft embarked, stood by to recover the aircraft in case I-25 was unable to.

After the floatplane returned safely to I-25, I-26 proceeded to her patrol area off Seattle, which she reached on 31 May 1942. On the afternoon of 7 June 1942, she was 35 nautical miles (65 km; 40 mi) southwest of Cape Flattery, Washington, when she fired a Type 89 torpedo at the 3,286-gross register ton cargo ship SS Coast Trader — which had departed Port Angeles, Washington, that day bound for San Francisco, California, with a cargo of 1,250 tons of newsprint — as she left the Strait of Juan de Fuca. The torpedo hit Coast Trader in her starboard side, and she sank by the stern in 40 minutes at 48°19′N 125°40′W, the first American ship sunk off the coast of Washington during World War II. One crewman died of exposure before the remainder were rescued over the following two days by the fishing schooner Virginia I and the Royal Canadian Navy corvette HMCS Edmundston. Apparently reluctant to acknowledge Japanese submarine activity off the U.S. West Coast at the same time that American shipping was suffering heavy losses at the hands of German submarines off the United States East Coast in what the German submarine crews called the "Second Happy Time," a U.S. Navy board of inquiry officially attributed the sinking of Coast Trader to "an internal explosion."

At 22:17 on 20 June 1942, I-26 surfaced either 2 or 5 nautical miles (3.7 or 9.3 km; 2.3 or 5.8 mi) (according to different sources) off the west coast of Vancouver Island in British Columbia, Canada, and shelled the Hesquiat radio-direction-finding (RDF) installation at Estevan Point with her 140-millimeter (5.5 in) deck gun. In the first attack on Canadian soil since the Fenian raids in 1870, she fired seventeen 140-millimeter (5.5 in) rounds — two exercise rounds filled with sand and 15 live shells — in rough seas and limited visibility, scoring no hits. Most of the shells fell short of the Estevan Point Lighthouse or exploded near it; one unexploded shell was recovered in the aftermath of the attack and another in June 1973.I-26 then headed west and turned north toward Unimak Pass in the Aleutian Islands, and five Royal Canadian Navy ships and a Royal Canadian Air Force Supermarine Stranraer flying boat sent to search for her failed to find her. Despite its lack of success, the shelling — which some local eyewitnesses mistakenly attributed to two cruisers — had a disproportionate effect on coastal shipping, as all lighthouses along the west coast of North America subsequently were extinguished to prevent their use for navigation by enemy vessels.

On 30 June 1942, I-26 departed her patrol area, and she was reassigned to the Advance Force that day. She returned to Yokosuka on 7 July 1942.

=== July–August 1942 ===
While I-26 was in Japan, Submarine Division 4 was deactivated on 10 August 1942, and I-26 was reassigned to Submarine Division 2 in Submarine Squadron 1 in the 6th Fleet. On 15 August 1942, she departed Yokosuka in company with the submarines I-9, I-15, I-17 and I-19 bound for Truk Atoll in the Caroline Islands, which she reached on 21 August 1942.

=== Guadalcanal campaign ===
==== Third war patrol ====
The Guadalcanal campaign had begun on 7 August 1942 with United States Marine Corps landings on Guadalcanal in the southeastern Solomon Islands, and soon after arriving at Truk, I-26 got back underway for her third war patrol to support Japanese forces on Guadalcanal. Ordered to operate as part of a submarine picket line, she arrived in her patrol area southeast of the Solomon Islands on 23 August 1942 and thereafter operated on the surface only in darkness. The Battle of the Eastern Solomons took place on 24 and 25 August 1942, and on 25 August 1942 she briefly sighted what she identified as an Allied task force consisting of an aircraft carrier and 10 destroyers at 16:00, then sighted what she identified as another Allied task force consisting of an aircraft carrier and a heavy cruiser in the same area at 20:00. She made another sighting at 00:20 on 26 August, this time of a task force which she reported as including one aircraft carrier, two battleships, three cruisers, and several destroyers. At 02:40 on 30 August 1942, she sighted a task force which she reported either as including one aircraft carrier, one battleship, and several destroyers or one battleship, one cruiser, and several destroyers.

I-26 was on the surface recharging her batteries northwest of Espiritu Santo in the New Hebrides after midnight on 31 August 1942 when she sighted several distant lights. After her commanding officer identified the lights as belonging to a U.S. Navy task force, she submerged to 265 feet (81 m). Meanwhile, the battleship USS North Carolina had detected I-26 on radar at 03:30 and the destroyer USS Farragut was detached from the task force to investigate, but she lost contact with the submarine.

After about three hours, I-26 surfaced and began a search for the task force, but did not find it. Just as she began to head back for her patrol area 140 nautical miles (260 km; 160 mi) east of San Cristobal in the southeastern Solomon Islands, one of her lookouts using her night binoculars sighted a ship resembling a large tanker at a range of 25,200 yards (23,000 m). Her commanding officer identified the ship as a "Saratoga-class" aircraft carrier. It was, in fact, the aircraft carrier USS Saratoga. I-26 submerged to periscope depth and began an approach, but she was making only 4 knots (7.4 km/h; 4.6 mph) and could not achieve an attack position until the U.S. task force changed course toward her, reaching a point only 1,100 yards (1,000 m) from I-26 and in a position for I-26 to launch a torpedo salvo at Saratoga′s starboard side. However, a mistake by I-26′s torpedomen in setting up one of the torpedoes prevented an attack.

At 07:46, I-26 returned to periscope depth and found herself alongside the destroyer USS MacDonough. She fired a six-torpedo spread at Saratoga and submerged to 330 feet (100 m). Saratoga went to full speed and began an evasive turn. One torpedo suffered a steering malfunction and broached and four others missed, but one hit Saratoga on her starboard side aft at 07:48 at 10°34′S 164°18′E, flooding one of her fire rooms. The damage forced Saratoga to fly off her aircraft to Henderson Field on Guadalcanal and make for Tongatabu, Fiji, for temporary repairs and then Pearl Harbor, Hawaii, for further repairs. Meanwhile, MacDonough and the destroyer USS Phelps gained sound contact on I-26 and dropped depth charges. After they departed, the destroyer USS Monssen remained on the scene and made several more unsuccessful depth charge attacks. The three destroyers mistakenly claimed sinking a submarine, but I-26 escaped.

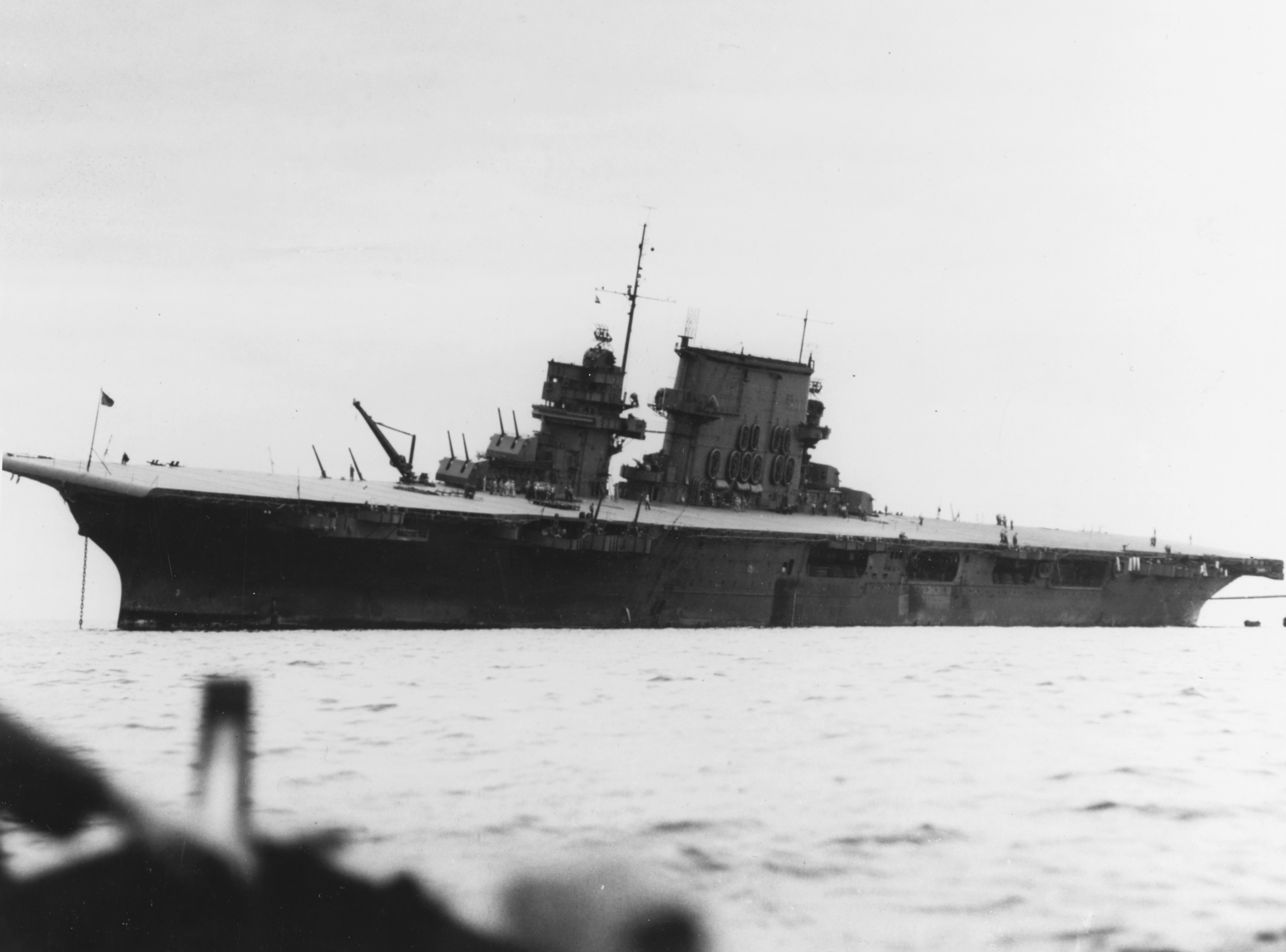
USS Saratoga under repair at Tongatabu, Tonga Islands, after being torpedoed by I-26, September 1942

At 09:30 on 13 September 1942, a Yokohama Air Group Kawanishi H8K flying boat reported an Allied task force 345 nautical miles (639 km; 397 mi) south-southeast of Tulagi in the Solomon Islands, and I-26 along with I-9, I-15, I-17, I-21, and the submarines I-24, I-31, and I-33 received orders to form a patrol line in the area. On 15 September, I-26 was reassigned to the 2nd Picket Unit, and on 25 September 1942 she concluded her patrol with her return to Truk, where she underwent repairs.

==== October 1942 ====
On 5 October 1942, I-26 departed Truk in company with I-15 and I-19, ordered to recharge the batteries of midget submarines from the seaplane carrier Chiyoda off Cape Esperance on the northwestern tip of Guadalcanal, then proceed to the Indispensable Reefs south of San Cristobal to relieve I-15 on duty refueling floatplanes there. On 11 October 1942, I-26 was on the surface southwest of Guadalcanal at 22:26 when she sighted what she identified as an American cruiser heading north. She submerged to begin an approach but could not achieve an attack position. She surfaced at 23:41 and transmitted a report of her sighting to Truk, but a delay in decoding it there prevented it from reaching Rear Admiral Aritomo Gotō — steaming toward Guadalcanal to bombard Henderson Field — in time to warn him of approaching enemy ships, and his force was surprised and defeated by a task force under Rear Admiral Norman Scott in the Battle of Cape Esperance that night.

I-26 arrived at the Indispensable Reefs on 18 October 1942 to relieve I-15 on aircraft refueling duties. Two Aichi E13A1 (Allied reporting name "Jake") floatplanes arrived early that morning. After one of them departed, an enemy patrol plane flew over the reef, and the second E13A1 took off immediately. Meanwhile, I-26 crash-dived and struck the reef, damaging her three lower torpedo tubes. She nonetheless continued her operations at Indispensable Reef. Early on the morning of 22 October, she refueled three E13A1 floatplanes, one of which later sighted the battleship North Carolina. On 23 October, she refueled an E13A1 which later located an Allied convoy. A U.S. Army Air Forces B-17 Flying Fortress bomber overflew the reef on 25 October, forcing her to crash-dive and preventing her from refueling aircraft that day, and on 26 October 1942, she departed the Indispensable Reefs, relieved of her refueling duties by the submarine I-122. She proceeded to Rabaul on New Britain in the Bismarck Archipelago, which she reached before the end of October.

==== Fourth war patrol ====
In November 1942, I-26 got underway from Rabaul and proceeded to the Japanese anchorage in the Shortland Islands, then departed the Shortlands to begin her fourth war patrol, ordered to operate between Guadalcanal and San Cristobal. In the predawn hours of 13 November 1942, Japanese and American surface forces fought the First Naval Battle of Guadalcanal (known to the Japanese as the "Third Battle of the Solomon Sea") in Ironbottom Sound north of Guadalcanal. In the battle's aftermath, the submerged I-26 encountered U.S. ships retiring after the action and sighted the heavy cruiser USS San Francisco at 11:01 on 13 November. She fired torpedoes from her three undamaged forward torpedo tubes. All three missed San Francisco, but one of them passed close to the light cruiser USS Helena and one struck the badly damaged light cruiser USS Juneau. The torpedo set off Juneau’s magazine, breaking her in half, and she sank in about 20 seconds at 10°33′S 161°03′E, killing all but 115 of her crew of 600 men. By the time a search-and-rescue effort found and rescued the survivors eight days later, only 10 men had survived. The five Sullivan brothers were among the dead.

I-26 dry-docked in Yokosuka for repairs, 11 December 1942. The submarine I-17 is seen to the left

On 14 November 1942, I-26 sighted what she identified as two destroyers, but at 06:54 the arrival of an Allied patrol plane forced her to dive and break contact. Later on 14 November, an American destroyer, probably USS Fletcher, pursued her briefly, but she escaped. She concluded her patrol with her arrival at Truk on either 29 or 30 November 1942, according to different sources, where her claim for sinking Juneau was not confirmed because the Japanese lacked information on Juneau′s identity.

==== December 1942–January 1943 ====
I-26 departed Truk on 3 December 1942 and set course for Yokosuka, which she reached on 9 December 1942. She underwent repairs at Yokosuka, and after their completion got back underway on 15 January 1943 to return to Truk. She arrived there on 20 January 1943 and — in accordance with orders by Admiral Yamamoto to the 6th Fleet commander, Vice Admiral Teruhisa Komatsu, in November 1942 to conduct supply runs to Guadalcanal using submarines — was fitted with a mount for a supply container on her afterdeck.

I-26 was assigned to Submarine Force B on 23 January 1943, and she departed Truk that day on her first supply run, carrying a self-propelled Tokugata-Unkato supply container — a craft converted from a Type A Kō-hyōteki-class midget submarine fitted with an elevated conning tower — bound for Guadalcanal. She arrived off Cape Esperance at the northwest tip of Guadalcanal on 28 January 1943 and pointed her stern directly at the coast to aid the container's pilot in reaching shore. After launching the container, she submerged and withdrew, and when two Allied patrol vessels arrived on the scene 30 minutes later they did not detect her.

I-26 proceeded to the waters north of Rennell Island. The Japanese began to evacuate their forces from Guadalcanal in Operation Ke on 31 January 1943. On 2 February 1943 I-26 was among submarines ordered to intercept a U.S. Navy aircraft carrier force reported to be 100 nautical miles (190 km; 120 mi) southeast of Rennell Island. None of the submarines found the reported aircraft carriers, but I-26 sighted an Allied destroyer on 3 February 1943. On 8 February 1943, Japanese aircraft reported U.S. Navy forces 150 nautical miles (280 km; 170 mi) southeast of Rennell Island, and I-26 again was among the submarines ordered to intercept them. Although I-18 and another Japanese submarine attacked the U.S. force, the other submarines did not make contact with it, and I-26 and the other submarines in the area except for I-11 and I-17 received orders to return to Truk. The Japanese completed the evacuation of Guadalcanal on 9 February 1943, bringing the six-month Guadalcaal campaign to an end, and I-26 returned to Truk on 11 February 1943.

=== Fifth war patrol ===
On 25 February 1943, Admiral Yamamoto ordered I-26 and the submarine I-6 to conduct anti-shipping operations off the east coast of Australia in the Sydney area. Accordingly, I-26 put to sea from Truk on 1 March 1943 to proceed to that area. During the Battle of the Bismarck Sea of 2–4 March 1943, U.S. Army Air Forces and Royal Australian Air Force (RAAF) aircraft and U.S. Navy PT boats attacked a Japanese convoy of eight transports and cargo ships carrying the Imperial Japanese Army′s 51st Division in the Bismarck Sea between New Guinea and the Bismarck Archipelago, sinking all eight of them as well as four of their eight escorting destroyers. I-26 interrupted her voyage to take part in rescue operations in the battle's aftermath. She rescued 20 Japanese soldiers from a collapsible lifeboat on 6 March and put them ashore at Lae, New Guinea, on 7 March, then returned to the Bismarck Sea. She rescued another 54 soldiers marooned on an uncharted coral island west of Goodenough Island on 8 March and dropped them off at Lae on 9 March. She then resumed her voyage to her patrol area.

On 28 March 1943, an Avro Anson of the RAAF's No. 71 Squadron sighted a submarine — probably I-26 — on the surface off Brisbane, Australia. The submarine opened automatic weapons fire on the Anson before the aircraft lost sight of it. The Anson turned on its landing lights in attempt to trick the submarine into opening fire again and revealing its position, but could not regain contact with the submarine.

I-26 was in the Tasman Sea 19 nautical miles (35 km; 22 mi) southeast of Cape Howe, Australia, when she fired three torpedoes at Convoy Q.C. 86 on 11 April 1943. One hit the Yugoslavian 4,732-gross register ton armed cargo steamer SS Recina — which was making a voyage under Australian Government charter from Whyalla, South Australia, to Newcastle, New South Wales, with a cargo of iron ore — in her starboard side at 14:01. Recina sank in less than a minute at 37°24′S 150°19′E with the loss of 32 lives. The Royal Australian Navy sloop-of-war HMAS Moresby attacked I-26 with seven depth charges, and the Australian corvettes HMAS Townsville and HMAS Bendigo joined in the search for I-26 but failed to locate her. Moresby rescued Recina′s 10 survivors.

After 19:00 on 24 April 1943, I-26 fired three torpedoes at the Australian 2,125-gross register ton armed cargo ship SS Kowarra in the Coral Sea 35 nautical miles (65 km; 40 mi) northeast of Sandy Cape at the northern tip of Fraser Island off the coast of Queensland, Australia. One torpedo hit Kowarra, which was on a voyage from Bowen, Queensland, to Brisbane with a cargo of sugar, and triggered a boiler explosion, causing her to break in two and sink within 45 seconds at 24°26′S 153°44′E with the loss of 21 lives. The U.S. Navy submarine chaser USS SC-747 rescued her 11 survivors. I-26 concluded her patrol with her arrival at Truk on 10 May 1943.

=== Sixth war patrol ===
I-26 began her sixth war patrol on 14 June 1943 with her departure from Truk to raid shipping in the Fiji area and divert Allied attention from Japanese activities elsewhere. As she approached an Allied convoy 180 nautical miles (330 km; 210 mi) southwest of Suva, Fiji, on 25 June 1943, a Lockheed Hudson patrol bomber of the Royal New Zealand Air Force′s No. 4 Squadron attacked her, dropping four depth charges. The aircraft's crew reporting seeing oil on the ocean's surface three minutes later, but I-26 suffered little damage. She returned to Truk on 7 August 1943.

=== August–November 1943 ===
I-26 departed Truk in August 1943 and proceeded to Yokosuka, where she arrived on 23 August. During her stay in Yokosuka, she underwent repairs and an overhaul, and on 18 September 1943 she received a new commanding officer, Lieutenant Commander Toshio Kusaka. On 1 November 1943 she was reassigned to Submarine Squadron 8, an element of the 6th Fleet based at Penang in Japanese-occupied British Malaya. She departed Yokosuka on 21 or 22 November 1943, according to different sources, and set course for Penang, which she reached probably in early December 1943.

=== Indian Ocean operations ===
==== Seventh war patrol ====
On 4 December 1943, I-26 set out from Penang on her seventh war patrol, ordered to refuel a flying boat conducting a reconnaissance flight, land Indian spies in India, and raid shipping in the Indian Ocean. She arrived at the Maldives on 8 December to rendezvous with the flying boat, a Kawanishi H8K of the 851st Naval Air Group ordered to reconnoiter the harbors at Goa in Portuguese India and Cochin in British India. The H8K arrived at 17:00 on 16 December 1943. The weather deteriorated as I-26 refueled it, and when it attempted to take off at sunset it damaged one of its floats and crashed. I-26 rescued its entire crew of 10 and sank its wreck with 25-millimeter gunfire.

I-26 got back underway and headed into the Arabian Sea. On 21 December 1943, she landed 10 Indian revolutionaries of the Hikari Kikan espionage office on the Indian coast near Karachi so that they could contribute to an anti-British insurgency. She then turned her attention to anti-shipping operations. On 28 December 1943, she fired three torpedoes at the American 7,176-gross register ton Liberty ship SS Robert F. Hoke at 20°05′N 059°25′E. Robert F. Hoke, which was making a voyage from Abadan, Iran, to Mombasa, British East Africa, took a torpedo hit in her No. 4 hold. A Royal Air Force crash boat rescued everyone aboard Robert F. Hoke, which remained afloat. She was towed to Aden and then to Suez, Egypt, where she was declared a total loss and hulked.

On 31 December 1943, I-26 fired three torpedoes at the British 8,054-gross register ton motor tanker MV Tornus in the Arabian Sea off Karachi, one of which hit her at 19°45′N 059°10′E. Tornus took a list to port, but her crew used counterflooding to correct it. I-26 fired two more torpedoes at her but failed to sink her. Tornus′s captain later received the Order of the British Empire for displaying great courage and determination in saving his ship.

In the Arabian Sea just outside the Gulf of Oman on 2 January 1944, I-26 attacked the 7,176-gross register ton Liberty ship SS Albert Gallatin. She fired four torpedoes, most of which missed, then surfaced and opened 140-millimeter (5.5 in) gunfire on Albert Gallatin. As Albert Gallatin began to sink, a Royal Air Force Bristol Blenheim aircraft arrived on the scene and dropped four bombs on I-26, inflicting minor damage on her. Albert Gallatin subsequently sank 60 nautical miles (110 km; 69 mi) off the coast of the Arabian Peninsula at 21°21′N 059°58′E. The Norwegian tanker Britannia rescued her crew. I-26 concluded her patrol on 15 January 1944 with her arrival at Singapore, where she underwent repairs.

==== Eighth war patrol ====
With her repairs complete, I-26 returned to Penang on 20 February 1944, then got back underway on 27 February 1944 to begin her eighth war patrol. During the patrol, Kusaka and his crew committed war crimes in their treatment of the survivors of Allied ships.

After landing 10 Indian revolutionaries of the Hikari Kikan espionage office on the Indian coast west of Karachi in early March 1944, I-26 began antishipping operations in the Arabian Sea. On 16 March 1944, she torpedoed the American 8,298-gross register ton armed tanker SS H. D. Collier — a ship operated by Standard Oil of California and making a voyage from Iran to Bombay with a cargo of 103,000 barrels of kerosene — in the Arabian Sea 330 nautical miles (610 km; 380 mi) south-southwest of Karachi. H. D. Collier′s stern caught fire, with the flames engulfing her stern gun, and her radio aerials were destroyed. I-26 surfaced and opened fire with her deck gun, but H. D. Collier′s United States Navy Armed Guard personnel could not bring her forward gun to bear on I-26. H. D. Collier′s crew and gunners abandoned ship, and she sank at 21°30′N 066°11′E.

On 21 March 1944 I-26 torpedoed the Norwegian motor tanker MV Grena — which was on a voyage in ballast from Aden to Abadan, Iran — in the Arabian Sea 30 nautical miles (56 km; 35 mi) off the coast of Muscat and Oman at 20°48′N 059°38′E. Grena broke in two and sank, with seven members of Grena′s 42-man crew losing their lives. In a harbinger of the behavior Kusaka and his crew would show toward survivors later in the month, I-26 surfaced and opened gunfire on Grena′s survivors, although she did not hit them.

On 29 March 1944, I-26 fired three torpedoes at the 7,176-gross register ton American armed Liberty ship SS Richard Hovey, which had departed Bombay, India, on 27 March. and was about halfway across the Arabian Sea during a voyage to Aden and then on to the United States with 71 men — a crew of 41, 28 personnel of the U.S. Navy Armed Guard, and a U.S. Army cargo security officer — and a 3,600-ton cargo of tea, jute, hemp, gunnies, and the personal effects of U.S. Army personnel on board. Richard Hovey′s crew sighted the incoming torpedoes at 16:20 and she began an evasive turn. One torpedo missed astern, but the Admiralty Defence Net — a shipboard torpedo net system — she had deployed did not protect her, as the other two torpedoes hit her in her No. 4 hold and engine room. The port boiler exploded, and the explosions of the torpedoes and boiler wrecked Richard Hovey′s steering telemotor system, jamming her rudder hard to port, ruptured a fuel tank, wrecked the wheelhouse, sheared off ventilator cowls, blew a lifeboat overboard, knocked down her main and emergency aerials, and trapped her captain in his cabin. Her crew freed her captain at 16:40 and a few minutes later abandoned ship, but the Navy Armed Guard personnel remained aboard to man her guns. At 17:00, I-26 hit Richard Hovey with another torpedo, prompting the Navy Armed Guard personnel to abandon ship as well. Three crewmen were left missing and presumed dead, but everyone else aboard Richard Hovey abandoned ship into three lifeboats and a two life rafts.

The survivors observed I-26′s periscope as she circled Richard Hovey. I-26 then surfaced less than 1 nautical mile (1.9 km; 1.2 mi) from the lifeboats and 500 yards (460 m) off Richard Hovey′s port bow and opened fire on the ship with her 140-millimeter (5.5 in) deck gun, scoring hits immediately. After 12 minutes, Richard Hovey was ablaze from stem to stern and I-26 shifted 140-millimeter (5.5 in) fire to the lifeboats, but her shells fell wide of the boats. I-26 then put on speed and steered toward the boats, opening fire on them and the sea around them with 25-millimeter antiaircraft guns, light machine guns, and rifles at a range of 100 yards (91 m). She rammed one of the boats, capsizing it and riddling its drinking water tanks, causing them to empty into the sea, before moving carefully around the boats, rafts, and debris and firing on any sign of a survivor while crewmen on her deck laughed; survivors noted that among men on I-26′s bridge were a Japanese man carefully filming the attack and a man wearing a turban, who they assumed was a member of the Indian National Army. After opening the range, I-26 resumed 140-millimeter (5.5 in) fire on the boats, hitting Lifeboat No. 4 with one round that punctured and emptied the fuel tank for its motor.

I-26 ceased fire and a member of her crew began calling out for Richard Hovey′s captain to identify himself. She came alongside Lifeboat No. 4 and took aboard the four men she found aboard it — which included Richard Hovey′s captain — as prisoners of war. Taking the lifeboat in tow, she departed the area eastbound, leaving behind only one lifeboat and one life raft afloat in addition to the capsized lifeboat. The four men she took aboard survived the war and were repatriated after its end. Richard Hovey sank sometime during the predawn hours of 30 March 1944 at 16°40′N 064°30′E.

Sources disagree on whether none of Richard Hovey′s personnel died in I-26′s attack on the survivors or four did. The survivors righted and boarded the capsized boat. The two boats became separated, and each set out for land independently. The 25 men aboard one boat were rescued on the first of April 200 nautical miles (370 km; 230 mi) east of the site of the sinking by the British Liberty ship SS Samcalia and were landed at Karachi on the fourth. One of the 39 men aboard the other boat died at sea on 10 April, but the other 38 were rescued on 14 April 1944 280 nautical miles (520 km; 320 mi) from the coast of India and 240 nautical miles (440 km; 280 mi) east-southeast of the site of the sinking by the British Liberty ship SS Samuta and were landed at Cochin, India, on 16 April 1944. I-26 returned to Penang on either 18 or 25 April 1944, according to different sources.

=== April–June 1944 ===
On 20 April 1944, I-26 was reassigned to the Advance Force. She departed Penang on 3 May 1944 and on 15 May 1944 arrived at Kure, Japan, where she underwent repairs and an overhaul. On 20 June 1944, she was reassigned to Submarine Division 15 in the 6th Fleet.

=== Marianas campaign ===
While I-26 was in Japan, the Marianas campaign began with U.S. landings on Saipan in the Mariana Islands on 15 June 1944. I-26 departed Kure on 27 June 1944 bound for Saipan with an Unpoto supply container — a 70-foot (21 m) sled that could carry up to 15 tons of cargo — secured on her deck with a 75-millimeter gun inside it. She was diverted to Guam on 5 July 1944. Daily U.S. bombardments of Guam in preparation for U.S. landings on the island began on 8 July, and when I-26 arrived off Guam on 9 July she found the island surrounded by U.S. warships. She ran aground, but freed herself and managed to enter Apra Harbor on the coast of Guam that evening. She delivered her Unpoto, embarked 120 Japanese pilots, and got back underway, setting course for Japan. She arrived at Yokosuka on 22 July 1944 for repairs and an overhaul.

=== August–October 1944 ===
Kusaka relinquished command of I-26 for another assignment on 1 August 1944. He never was brought to trial for ordering the crew of I-26 to fire on the survivors of Grena or Richard Hovey. After completion of her repairs and overhaul, I-26 moved to Kure, Japan.

=== Ninth war patrol ===
On 13 October 1944, the commander-in-chief of the Combined Fleet, Admiral Soemu Toyoda, activated the Sho-1-Go plan for the defense of the Philippine Islands, and I-26 got underway from Kure in company with the submarine I-45 that day to begin her ninth war patrol, assigned a patrol area in the Philippine Sea. I-26, I-45, and the submarines I-53, I-54, and I-56 were designated Group A under the personal leadership of the commander-in-chief of the 6th Fleet, Vice Admiral Shigeyoshi Miwa, and ordered to intercept U.S. Navy Task Force 38.

On 18 October 1944, I-26 reported to the 6th Fleet that she continuously had detected groups of aircraft 520 nautical miles (960 km; 600 mi) from Manila on a bearing of 62 degrees. The Battle of Leyte began with U.S. Army landings on Leyte in the Philippines on 20 October 1944, and on 24 October 1944, as the Battle of Leyte Gulf began, I-26 was ordered to patrol in an area southeast of Leyte Gulf. As the Battle off Samar, one of the major actions of the Battle of Leyte Gulf, raged on 25 October 1944, I-26 reported that she had sighted four U.S. aircraft carriers off Leyte. The Japanese never heard from her again.

=== Loss ===
On 27 October 1944, I-26 was ordered to an area east of Lamon Bay, but she never acknowledged the order. When 6th Fleet headquarters issued an order on 7 November 1944 for submarines in the Leyte area to return to their home bases, I-26 did not respond. On 21 November 1944, the Imperial Japanese Navy declared I-26 to be presumed lost with all 105 hands east of Leyte. The Japanese removed her from the Navy list on 10 March 1945.

The cause of the loss of I-26 is controversial. Some historians have concluded that she sank in a diving accident. Others believe it more likely that she was sunk when she attacked the escort aircraft carrier USS Petrof Bay during the night of 25–26 October 1944 in the aftermath of the Battle off Samar and that the destroyer escorts USS Coolbaugh and USS Richard M. Rowell of Petrof Bay′s screen sank her, most likely by a Hedgehog barrage from Richard M. Rowell early on 26 October at 09°45′N 126°45′E.

== Summary of attacks ==
I-26 was the Imperial Japanese Navy's third-highest-scoring submarine in terms of tonnage sunk during World War II, sinking more than 51,500 tons of enemy shipping.

Date	Action	Location	Commanding officer
7 December 1941	Sank SS Cynthia Olson, 2,140 grt	Pacific Ocean 33°42′N 145°29′W	CDR Minoru Yokota
7 June 1942	Sank SS Coast Trader, 3,286 grt	Pacific Ocean 48°15′N 125°40′W	CDR Minoru Yokota
20 June 1942	Shelled Hesquiat RDF site	Vancouver Island, British Columbia, Canada	CDR Minoru Yokota
31 August 1942	Damaged USS Saratoga, 33,681 dt	Pacific Ocean 10°34′S 164°18′E	CDR Minoru Yokota
13 November 1942	Sank USS Juneau, 6,718 dt	Pacific Ocean 10°34′S 164°04′E	CDR Minoru Yokota
11 April 1943	Sank SS Recina, 4,732 grt	Tasman Sea 37°24′S 150°19′E	CDR Minoru Yokota
24 April 1943	Sank SS Kowarra, 2,125 grt	Coral Sea 24°26′S 153°44′E	CDR Minoru Yokota
28 December 1943	Damaged SS Robert F. Hoke, 7,176 grt	Arabian Sea 20°05′N 059°25′E	LCDR Toshio Kusaka
31 December 1943	Damaged MV Tornus, 8,045 grt	Arabian Sea 19°45′N 059°10′E	LCDR Toshio Kusaka
2 January 1944	Sank SS Albert Gallatin, 7,176 grt	Arabian Sea 21°21′N 059°58′E	LCDR Toshio Kusaka
13 March 1944	Sank SS H. D. Collier, 8,298 grt	Arabian Sea 21°30′N 066°11′E	LCDR Toshio Kusaka
21 March 1944	Sank MV Grena, 8,117 grt	Arabian Sea 20°48′N 059°38′E	LCDR Toshio Kusaka
30 March 1944	Sank SS Richard Hovey, 7,176 grt	Arabian Sea 16°40′N 064°30′E	LCDR Toshio Kusaka
