= Stratford School (disambiguation) =

Stratford School may refer to:

- Stratford School, a secondary school in Forest Gate, London, England
- Stratford Elementary School, in Stratford, California, United States
- Stratford School District, in Stratford, New Jersey, United States
- Stratford School District (Wisconsin), in the List of school districts in Wisconsin
- Stratford School (California), a chain of private schools in the United States

== See also ==
- Stratford High School (disambiguation)
