= USS Stratford =

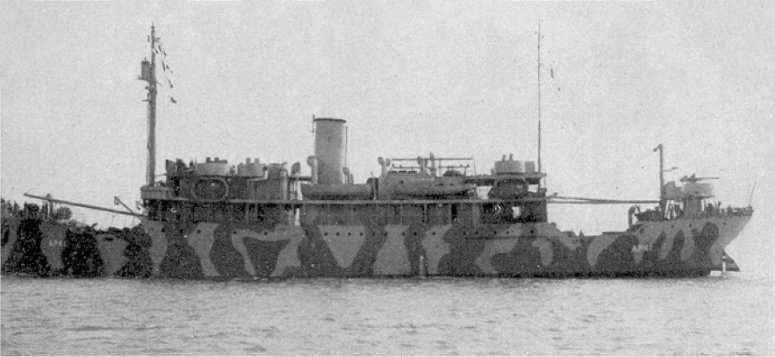
- USS Stratford (AP-41) in camouflage colors, 4 May 1942, location unknown

History

United States
- Name: USS Stratford
- Namesake: Stratford Hall, an estate in Westmoreland County, Virginia
- Laid down: 1917
- Launched: 28 May 1918
- Christened: War Mist
- Acquired: 31 July 1941
- Commissioned: 25 August 1941
- Decommissioned: 17 April 1946
- Renamed: Catherine, USS Stratford
- Reclassified: AK-45 to AP-41, date unknown
- Stricken: 1 May 1946
- Fate: Sold for scrapping in 1956

General characteristics
- Displacement: 2,300 t.(lt) 3,640 t.(fl)
- Length: 261 ft (80 m)
- Beam: 43 ft 6 in (13.26 m)
- Draught: 15 ft 7 in (4.75 m)
- Propulsion: steam turbine, single screw
- Speed: 9.6 kts.
- Complement: 132
- Armament: one single 3 in (76 mm) dual purpose gun mount; three single 40 mm AA gun mounts

USS Stratford (AK-45/AP-41) was a Stratford-class transport commissioned by the U.S. Navy for service in World War II. She was responsible for delivering military personnel and equipment to ships and stations in the war zone.

Stratford (AP-41), ex-SS Catherine, was built in 1918 by the Manitowoc Shipbuilding Company of Manitowoc, Wisconsin, acquired by the Navy on 31 July 1941, and commissioned on 25 August 1941 at Baltimore, Maryland.

== World War II service ==
After completing her shakedown in the Chesapeake Bay area, Stratford sailed from Norfolk, Virginia, on 23 October, for Iceland, via New York City and Nova Scotia. She arrived at Reykjavík on 16 November 1941 and operated there until 25 March 1942 when she returned to Boston, Massachusetts. The transport made another cruise to Iceland and returned to Boston, Massachusetts, on 27 June. She was ordered to proceed to California, via Norfolk, Key West, Florida, Guantánamo Bay, and the Panama Canal Zone.

Stratford arrived at San Pedro, Los Angeles, on 28 August; loaded passengers; and sailed for Hawaii three days later. She arrived there on the 11th and sailed the following week for Samoa. The transport remained in the South Pacific until April 1945. She shuttled troops and cargo from rear areas to advance bases and; as the Americans penetrated further into the Pacific, her ports of call increased. In addition to ports in New Zealand and New Caledonia, Stratford also operated in the Solomon, Treasury, St. Matthias, New Hebrides, Russell, and Treasury Islands as well as ports in New Guinea.

Stratford arrived at Leyte on 2 April 1945 and operated in the Philippine Islands until 1 December when she sailed for the United States, via Eniwetok and Pearl Harbor.

== Decommission ==
The transport arrived at San Pedro, Los Angeles, in January 1946 and remained there until sailing for the east coast on 7 March. Stratford reached Norfolk, Virginia, on 7 March and reported to the 5th Naval District for disposition. She departed there on 3 April and headed for Baltimore, Maryland, where she had originally entered naval service. Stratford was decommissioned there on 17 April and returned to the War Shipping Administration on the same day. She was struck from the Navy list on 1 May 1946.

== Military awards and honors ==
Stratford received one battle star for World War II service.

Her crew was eligible for the following medals:

- American Defense Service Medal (with Fleet clasp)
- American Campaign Medal
- European-African-Middle Eastern Campaign Medal
- Asiatic–Pacific Campaign Medal (1)
- World War II Victory Medal
- Philippines Liberation Medal

== See also ==
- SS Cynthia Olson sister ship
- USS Gemini (AP-75) sister ship
