= Stafford (surname) =

- Language: English

Origin
- Language: English
- Derivation: "Staef" (landing stage) + "forda" (ford)
- Meaning: "the landing-stage by the ford"

Other names
- Variant forms: de Stafford; Staffort

Stafford is an English surname originating from Staffordshire which may derive from Anglo-Saxon meaning 'landing stage by the ford'. The Staffords may also refer to the people of Staffordshire. see also: de Stafford, de Staffort

== People ==
People with this surname include:

- Stafford (baseball), 19th century baseball player(s) with an unknown given name
- Abi Stafford, American ballet dancer and sister of Jonathan
- Alexander Stafford, British politician
- Anne Stafford, Countess of Huntingdon (1483–1544), mistress of Henry VIII who was prosecuted for adultery with his friend, William Compton
- Barbara Stafford
  - Barbara Stafford (born 1953), American legislator
  - Barbara Maria Stafford (born 1941), American art historian and writer
- Drew Stafford (born 1985), American professional ice hockey player
- Edmund Stafford (disambiguation)
  - Edmund Stafford (1344–1419) Bishop of Exeter
  - Edmund Stafford, 1st Baron Stafford (1272–1308), British nobleman who was summoned to parliament by King Edward I
  - Edmund Stafford, 5th Earl of Stafford (1377–1398), British nobleman
- Edward Stafford (disambiguation)
  - Edward Stafford (politician) (1819–1901), third Premier of New Zealand
  - Edward Stafford, 3rd Duke of Buckingham (1478–1521), brother of Henry VIII's mistress Anne Stafford, executed for treason
  - Edward Stafford, 2nd Earl of Wiltshire (1470–1498), British nobleman
  - Edward Stafford, 3rd Baron Stafford (1535–1603), British nobleman
  - Edward Stafford, 4th Baron Stafford (1572–1625), British nobleman
  - Sir Edward Stafford (diplomat) (1552–1604), British ambassador to Paris; MP; a traitor in the pay of Spain
  - Sir Edward Stafford (politician) (1819–1901), Premier of New Zealand
  - Cdr. Edward Peary Stafford, USN (Ret.) (1918–2013), USN officer, naval aviator, and author.
  - Ed Stafford (Edward James Stafford FRSGS; born 1975), British explorer
- Emma Stafford, British classicist
- Erik Stafford, American economist
- Frederick Stafford (1928–1979), Austrian-born actor
- Garrett Stafford (born 1980), American professional hockey player
- Godfrey Stafford (1920–2013), South African-born British physicist
- Greg Stafford
  - Greg Stafford (game designer) (1948–2018), formally "Francis Gregory Stafford", American role playing game designer and shamanic practitioner
  - Greg Stafford (footballer) (born 1974), Australian rules football player
  - Greg Stafford (politician), British Member of Parliament
- Jessica-Jane Stafford (née Jessica-Jane Clement; born 1985), British actress and TV presenter
- Harrison Stafford (1912–2004), American football player
- Harry Stafford (disambiguation)
  - Harry Stafford (1869–1940), British footballer
  - Harry Stafford (motorcyclist) (born 1993), British motorcycle racer
- Helen A. Stafford (1922–2011), American plant physiologist and phytochemist
- Henry Stafford (disambiguation)
  - Henry Stafford, 1st Baron Stafford (1501–1563), British nobleman
  - Henry Stafford, 2nd Duke of Buckingham (1454–1483), British nobleman
  - Sir Henry Stafford (died 1471), second son of Humphrey Stafford, 1st Duke of Buckingham and Lady Anne Neville, and third husband of Margaret Beaufort, Countess of Richmond and Derby
- Hugh Stafford, 2nd Earl of Stafford (1342–1386), British nobleman
- Humphrey Stafford (disambiguation)
  - Humphrey Stafford, 1st Duke of Buckingham (1402–1460), British nobleman and a military commander in the Hundred Years' War and the Wars of the Roses
  - Humphrey Stafford, Earl of Stafford (1425–1455), British nobleman
  - Humphrey Stafford, 1st Earl of Devon, 1st Baron Stafford of Southwick (1439?–69), British nobleman
- James Stafford (born 1932), American Cardinal Major Penitentiary of the Roman Catholic Church
- Jean Stafford (1915–1979), American short story writer and novelist
- Jean Stafford (musician) (born 1950), Australian country music artist
- Jim Stafford (born 1944), American comedian and musician
- Jo Stafford (1917–2008), American traditional pop singer
- John Stafford (disambiguation)
  - John Stafford (d.1452), Archbishop of Canterbury
  - John Stafford, 1st Earl of Wiltshire (1427–1473), English nobleman
- Jonathan Stafford, American retired ballet dancer, New York City Ballet artistic director and brother of Abi
- Lee Stafford (born 1966), celebrity hairdresser
- Maria Brewster Brooks Stafford (1809–1896), American educator
- Marilyn Stafford (1925–2023), American-born British photographer
- Mary Stafford, née Mary Boleyn, sister of Anne Boleyn and mistress of Henry VIII
- Mary Stafford (singer) (1895–1938), American cabaret singer
- Matthew Stafford
  - Matthew Stafford (born 1988), American football player
  - Matthew Stafford (politician) (1852–1950), Irish businessman and senator
- Michelle Stafford (born 1965), American actress, screenwriter and producer
- Nancy Stafford (born 1954), American actress, speaker and author
- Ralph Stafford, 1st Earl of Stafford (1301–1372), British nobleman
- Robert Stafford (disambiguation), several people
- Ronald B. Stafford (1935–2005), American politician
- Susan Stafford (born 1945), American model, actress and television host
- Tal Stafford (1890–1967), American college sports coach
- Terry Stafford (1941–1996), American singer and songwriter
- Thomas Stafford (disambiguation), several people
- Victoria "Tori" Stafford (2000–2009), Canadian murder victim
- William Stafford (disambiguation), several people

== Fictional characters ==
- Edward Stafford (The Tudors), a fictionalized version of the 3rd Duke of Buckingham, on the TV show "The Tudors"

== Others ==
- Justice Stafford (disambiguation), judges named Stafford
- Baron Stafford, persons of the Stafford Barony, holding the title Baron Stafford; also Viscount Stafford
- Earl of Stafford, persons of the Stafford Earldom, holding the title Count of Stafford; also Marquess Stafford

== See also ==
- Stafford (disambiguation)
- Stafford family tree showing relationships between some of the above.
