= William Howard =

Bill, Billy, Will, Willie or William Howard may refer to:

== Noblemen and politicians ==
=== American ===
- William J. Howard (1799–1862), Pittsburgh mayor in 1845
- William Alanson Howard (1813–1880), U.S. representative from Michigan (1855–1859) and governor of Dakota Territory 1878–1880
- William Howard (congressman) (1817–1891), U.S. representative from Ohio
- William M. Howard (1857–1932), U.S. representative from Georgia
- William O. Howard (1923-2006), American politician from Missouri
- William S. Howard (1875–1953), U.S. representative from Georgia
- William Lorenzo Howard (1921–2004), mayor of Monroe, Louisiana

=== British ===
- William Howard (judge) (before 1230—1308), English nobleman and ancestor of aristocratic Howard family, Judge Advocate of Fleet
- William Howard, 1st Baron Howard of Effingham (c. 1510–1573), English nobleman
- William Howard (died 1600) (1538–1600), English member of parliament
- Lord William Howard (1563–1640), nicknamed "Belted Will" or "Bauld Willie", third son of 4th Duke of Norfolk
- William Howard, 3rd Baron Howard of Effingham (1577–1615), his grandson, heir to 1st Earl of Nottingham
- William Howard (died 1672) (c. 1599–1672), English gentleman and member of parliament
- William Howard, 1st Viscount Stafford (1614–1680)
- William Howard, 3rd Baron Howard of Escrick (1626–1694), conspirator in Rye House Plot
- William Howard (died 1701) (c. 1674–1701), English member of parliament for Carlisle 1695–1701 and Northumberland 1701
- William Howard (Irish politician) (before 1680–1728), member of parliament for Dublin City 1727–28
- William Howard, Viscount Andover (1714–1756), British member of parliament and heir to Earl of Berkshire
- William Howard, 3rd Earl of Wicklow (1761–1818), British nobleman, Earl of Wicklow
- William Howard (1781–1843), British member of parliament for Morpeth 1806–1826 and 1830–1832, Sutherland 1837–1840
- William Howard, 4th Earl of Wicklow (1788–1869), British nobleman
- William Howard, 8th Earl of Wicklow (1902–1978), British nobleman
- William George Howard, 8th Earl of Carlisle (1808–1889), English clergyman and peer

== Performers ==
- Willie Howard (1883–1949), American comedian with his brother Eugene as Howard Brothers
- Billy Howard (comedian), English comedian and impressionist active since 1960s

== Sportsmen ==
- Billy Howard (gridiron football) (1950–2005), American defensive lineman with the Detroit Lions
- William Howard (American football) (born 1964), American running back with the Tampa Bay Buccaneers
- Willie Howard (born 1977), American football defensive end and coach
- Will Howard (cricketer) (born 1981), English first-class cricketer
- William Howard (basketball) (born 1993), French power forward
- Will Howard (American football) (born 2001), American quarterback with the Pittsburgh Steelers
- Bill Howard (rugby union)

== Writers ==
- William Howard (engineer) (1793–1834), American railroad topographer and memoirist
- William Lee Howard (1860–1918), American physician and writer
- William K. Howard (1899–1954), American film director, writer and producer
- William Alvin Howard (1926–2026), American proof theorist (Curry-Howard correspondence)
- M. William Howard Jr. (born 1946), American academic and Reformed Church historian
- Bill Howard (journalist) (born 1969), American Catholic journalist and editor

== Others ==
- William Bullitt Howard (1821–1896), American plantation owner, slave owner and founder of Lee's Summit, Missouri
- William D. M. Howard (1818–1856), American businessman in San Francisco'
- William Howard (typefounder), 19th-century English designer at Chiswick Press in Great Queen Street
- William Howard (artist) (before 1830—after 1870), African American woodworker and craftsman
- William R. Howard (1922–2009), American businessman and Piedmont Airlines executive

== See also ==
- William Howard School, Brampton, England
- William Stafford-Howard (disambiguation)
