= Ed Stafford (disambiguation) =

Ed Stafford may refer to:

== People ==
- Ed Stafford (born 1975) British explorer
- Edwin Stafford Nelson (1928-2014) U.S. actor
- Edmund Stafford (disambiguation)
- Edward Stafford (disambiguation)

== Other uses ==
- Ed Stafford: Into The Unknown (TV series) 2015 Discovery Channel documentary series
