= Jack Stafford =

Jack Stafford may refer to:

- Jack Stafford (umpire)
- Jack Stafford (rugby union)
- Jack Stafford (guitarist)

== See also ==
- John Stafford (disambiguation)
