= William Stafford =

William Stafford may refer to:

== Courtiers ==
- William Stafford (courtier) (c. 1500–1556), courtier to Henry VIII and Edward VI of England; husband of Mary Boleyn, thus brother-in-law to Queen Anne Boleyn
- William Stafford (conspirator) (1554–1612), courtier and conspirator
- William Howard, 1st Viscount Stafford (1614–1680), British nobleman and Roman Catholic martyr
- William Stafford, 4th Earl of Stafford (1375–1395)

== Politicians ==
- William Stafford (MP) (1627–1665), MP for Stamford
- William H. Stafford (1869–1957), United States Representative for Wisconsin
- Will Stafford (1837–1884), one of founders of the nineteenth century UK labour movement

== Others ==
- William Stafford (British soldier) (1854–1952), played in 1875 FA Cup Final and 1873–74 Home Nations rugby union match
- William Stafford (died 1450) of Southwick, Wiltshire
- William Stafford (author) (1593–1684), British author
- William Stafford (poet) (1914–1993), American poet
- William Henry Stafford Jr. (1931–2025), United States federal judge
- William Stafford (mining engineer) (1842–1907), Scottish coal mining engineer responsible for the location of Lethbridge, Canada
- William Josephus Stafford (1781–1823), sea captain and privateer during the War of 1812 and afterward
- Billy Stafford from A Ticket to Red Horse Gulch

== See also ==
- Bill Stafford (1939–2001), American baseball player
- Stafford (surname)
- William Stafford-Howard (disambiguation)
- Stafford (disambiguation)
- William (disambiguation)
