= Second VA-85 (U.S. Navy) =

Attack Squadron 85
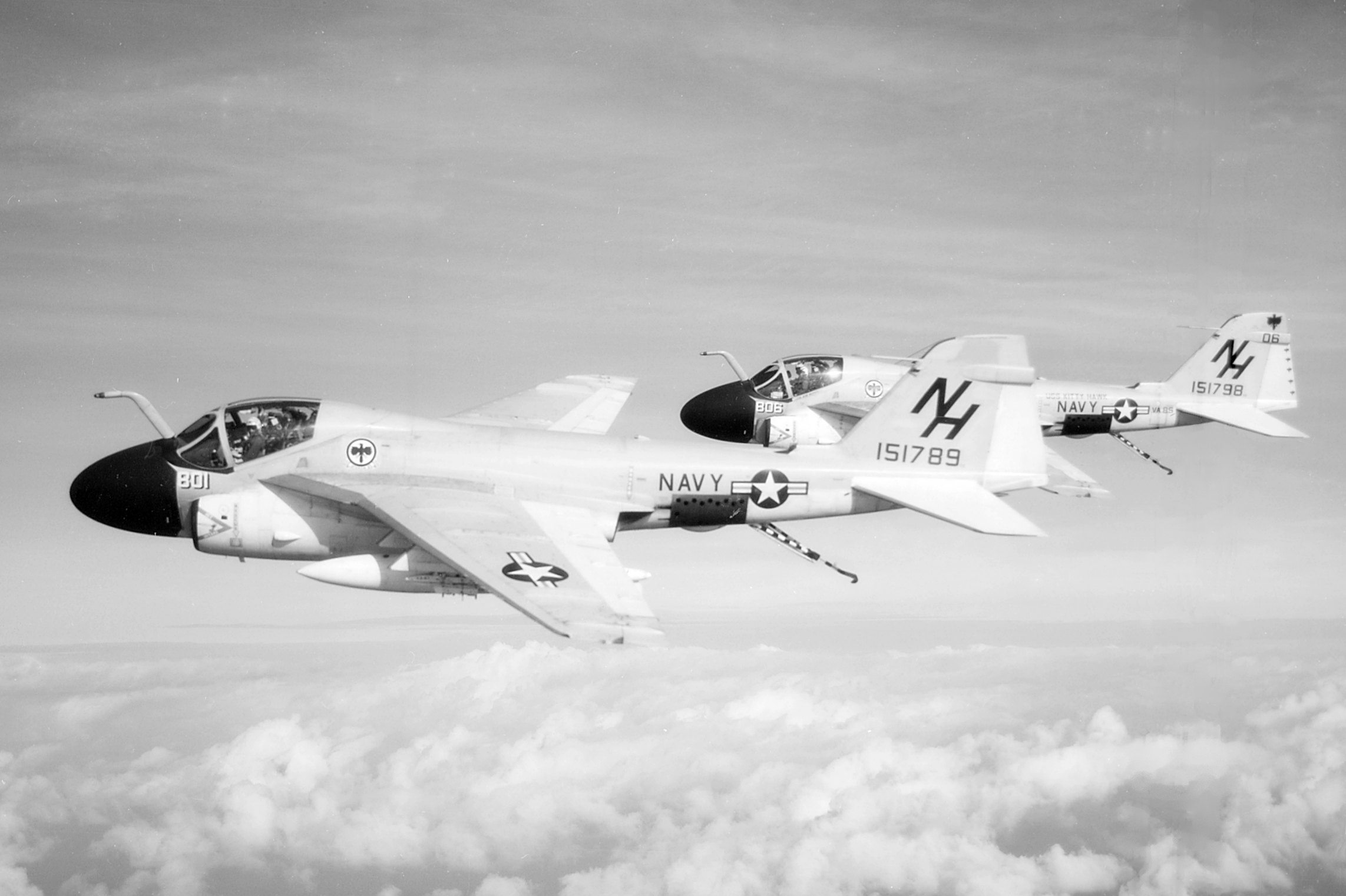
- VA-85 A-6As over the South China Sea in January 1966. The far aircraft was shot down three months later; both crew members were killed
- Active: 1 February 1951 – 30 September 1994
- Country: United States
- Branch: United States Navy
- Role: Attack aircraft
- Part of: Inactive
- Nickname(s): Black Falcons
- Engagements: Vietnam War; Lebanese Civil War; Operation Prairie Fire; Operation El Dorado Canyon; Operation Desert Storm; Operation Deny Flight; Operation Continue Hope; Operation Southern Watch

Aircraft flown
- Attack: TBF Avenger; A-1 Skyraider; A-6 Intruder

Attack Squadron 85 or VA-85 was a long-lived Attack Squadron of the U.S. Navy. It was called to active duty as U.S. Navy Reserve squadron VA-859 on 1 February 1951 and redesignated VA-85 on 4 February 1953. It was disestablished on 30 September 1994, over 40 years later. The squadron's nickname from 1958-1994 was the Black Falcons. It was the second squadron to be designated VA-85, the first VA-85 was disestablished on 29 November 1949.

== History ==
- May 1958: As part of an Atlantic Fleet training exercise (LANTRAEX 1-58), two of the squadron's AD-6 Skyraiders, flown by Lieutenant (jg)s Strang and Woods, flew nonstop from USS Forrestal, operating off the coast of Jacksonville, Florida, to Naval Air Station North Island. The flight was conducted below 1000 feet to demonstrate the low level and long range capability of the squadron. Two days later the aircraft returned, nonstop, to Forrestal.
- 5 February 1963: The squadron's commanding officer, Commander C. H. Mundt, was killed in an air crash.
- 22 December 1965: The squadron's commanding officer, Commander B. J. Cartwright, and his bombardier/navigator, Lieutenant Ed Gold, failed to return from a strike into North Vietnam and were listed as missing in action, presumed dead until their remains were identified in November 1994.
- 21 April 1966: The squadron's commanding officer, Commander J. E. Keller, and his bombardier/navigator, Lieutenant Commander E. E. Austin, were killed in action during a mission over North Vietnam.
- 27 April 1966: VA-85 bombardier/navigator, Lieutenant (jg) Brian E. Westin was awarded the Navy Cross for heroism during a combat mission over North Vietnam when he risked his own life to save that of his wounded pilot, Lieutenant W. R. Westerman.
- 6 September 1968: The squadron's commanding officer, Commander K. L. Coskey, was shot down over North Vietnam. His bombardier/navigator, Lieutenant Commander R. G. McKee, was rescued, but Commander Coskey became a POW. He was released on 14 March 1973.
- July 1974: Following the coup that overthrew the government of Cyprus, VA-85 operated from Forrestal in the vicinity of Cyprus and provided air cover for the evacuation of Americans and foreign nationals from the island.
- May–June 1981: Following increased military action and Israeli reprisal raids against Syrian missile positions in southern Lebanon, Forrestal was ordered to the eastern Mediterranean. VA-85 operated from the carrier while on station off the coast of Lebanon.
- July 1982: Following the Israeli invasion of Lebanon in June and the siege of west Beirut, Forrestal operated off the coast of Lebanon with VA-85 prepared to provide air support for a possible evacuation of Americans.
- August–September 1982: Forrestal and its embarked squadrons provided air cover for the landing of 800 U.S. Marines in Beirut, Lebanon. The Marines became part of the Multinational Force in Lebanon.
- 4 December 1983: During USS John F. Kennedy’s operations off the coast of Lebanon in support of the Multinational Force, several of the carrier's F-14 reconnaissance aircraft received hostile fire from Syrian surface- to-air missile and anti-aircraft positions on 3 December. A retaliatory strike was flown by elements of CVW-3 and aircraft from USS Independence against the Syrian antiaircraft positions near Hammana, Lebanon. One of the squadron's A-6Es was lost in the attack, its pilot, Lieutenant Mark Lange, was killed and the NFO, Lieutenant Bobby Goodman, was captured by the Syrians. He was released 4 January 1985.
- July 1984: The squadron operated in the Caribbean and off the coast of Central America to assist the Coast Guard with drug interdiction operations.
- 10 October 1985: The squadron's KA-6D tanker aircraft refueled F-14s from USS Saratoga en route to their intercept of an Egyptian 737 airliner that was carrying Arab terrorists who had hijacked the Italian cruise ship Achille Lauro on 7 October and murdered an American citizen. The F-14s forced the airliner to land at Naval Air Station Sigonella, Sicily, leading to the capture of the terrorists.
- 24 March 1986: Libyan missiles were fired at U.S. Naval forces operating in the Gulf of Sidra. This action precipitated a retaliation against Libya by squadrons from Saratoga, USS America and USS Coral Sea. VA-85's A-6Es conducted a follow-up attack with Rockeye bombs on a Libyan La Combattante II G-class fast attack missile craft that had been hit by a Harpoon missile fired by a VA-34 aircraft. The attack resulted in the sinking of the Combattante II. VA-85 aircraft also attacked a Nanuchka II class missile corvette with Rockeyes, damaging the corvette.
- 25 March 1986: VA-55 attacked a Nanuchka with Rockeyes, damaging but not stopping the corvette. A VA-85 aircraft then launched a Harpoon against the corvette which resulted in its sinking.
- 6 September 1989: Squadron aircraft flew missions in support of the evacuation of personnel from the American Embassy in Beirut, Lebanon, due to the unstable situation in that country.
- 17 January–28 February 1991: The squadron participated in Operation Desert Storm, combat strikes against targets in Iraq and the Kuwaiti theater of operations. During this period of combat the squadron flew 585 combat sorties, consisting of 1,700 flight hours and expended over 850 tons of ordnance.
- August 1993: Squadron aircraft flew missions over Bosnia-Herzegovina in support of U. N. Operation Deny Flight.
- November 1993: Squadron aircraft flew sorties over Mogadishu, Somalia, in support of U. N. Operation Continue Hope.
- December 1993: Squadron aircraft provided support for reconnaissance missions over southern Iraq, part of Operation Southern Watch.

== Home port assignments ==
The squadron was assigned to these home ports, effective on the dates shown:

- NAS Niagara Falls – 01 Feb 1951
- NAS Jacksonville – 05 Apr 1951
- NAS Quonset Point – 26 Sep 1951
- NAS Oceana – 11 Jun 1952

== Aircraft assignment ==
The squadron first received the following aircraft on the dates shown:

- TBM-3E Avenger – Flown during its reserve duty prior to 1 February 1951.
- AD-2 Skyraider – 05 Mar 1951
- AD-4 Skyraider – Jul 1952
- AD-6/AD-1H Skyraider – Jan 1954
- A-6A Intruder – 06 Mar 1964
- KA-6D Intruder – 18 Nov 1970
- A-6E Intruder – 09 Dec 1971 (VA-85 was the first fleet squadron to receive the A-6E.)

== See also ==
- Attack aircraft
- List of inactive United States Navy aircraft squadrons
- History of the United States Navy
