= Soutter =

Soutter is a surname. Notable people with the surname include:

- Ellie Soutter (2000–2018), British snowboarder
- F. W. Soutter (1844–1932), British activist
- George Soutter (1934–2011), Australian paediatrician, life partner of John Yu
- James Soutter (1885–1966), British athlete
- Julian Soutter (born 1994), South African cricketer
- Lamar Soutter (1909–1996), American thoracic surgeon
- Louis Soutter (1871–1942), Swiss engineer, architect, painter and musician
- Lucy Soutter, British squash player
- Michel Soutter (1932–1991), Swiss film director and screenwriter
- Nicholas Lamar Soutter, American writer and philosopher
