= Humphrey Stafford =

Humphrey Stafford may refer to:

== Stafford of Hooke & Southwick ==
- Humphrey Stafford (died 1413), of Southwick, Wiltshire & Hooke, Dorset
- Humphrey Stafford (died 1442), of Hooke, Dorset ("With the Silver Hand")
- Humphrey Stafford, 1st Earl of Devon, 1st Baron Stafford of Southwick (1439?–1469)

== Stafford of Grafton ==
- Humphrey Stafford (died 1419), of Grafton, Worcestershire
- Humphrey Stafford (died 1450), of Grafton, Worcestershire
- Humphrey Stafford (died 1486), of Grafton, Worcestershire

== Stafford of Stafford Castle ==
- Humphrey Stafford, Earl of Stafford (1425?–1458), of Stafford Castle, Staffordshire
- Humphrey Stafford, 1st Duke of Buckingham (1402–1460), of Stafford Castle, Staffordshire

== See also ==
- Stafford (surname)
- Humphrey (disambiguation)
- Stafford (disambiguation)
