= Greg Stafford =

Greg Stafford may refer to:

- Greg Stafford (game designer) (1948–2018), American game designer
- Greg Stafford (footballer) (born 1974), Australian rules football player
- Greg Stafford (politician), British politician
