= Bethany Baptist Church (Newark, New Jersey) =

Historic church in New Jersey, United States

- U.S. National Register of Historic Places
- New Jersey Register of Historic Places
- Location within Essex County, New Jersey Location within New Jersey Location within the United States
- Location: 275 W. Market Street, Newark, New Jersey
- Coordinates: 40°44′25″N 74°11′1″W
- Area: 0.2 acres (0.081 ha)
- Built: 1866
- Architectural style: Romanesque
- NRHP reference No.: 88000466
- NJRHP No.
- Added to NRHP: May 10, 1989

Cornel West at the puplit of Bethany Baptist

Bethany Baptist Church is a historic church at 117 W. Market Street in Newark, Essex County, New Jersey, United States.

The church traces its origins to 1870, when a group of African Americans established the church on Broad Street in Newark in the building of the Peddie Memorial Baptist Church. Under the leadership of the Reverend Ebenezer Bird, who had come from Virginia to lead the congregation of about 26 members, the group was officially sanctioned as a church by the Council of Baptist Churches in June 1871. Thus, the church prides itself on being the "first Baptist congregation founded by people of African descent."

The Romanesque style church building was constructed in 1866. It was added to the National Register of Historic Places in 1989.

The church was under the stewardship of M. William Howard, Jr., from 2000 to 2015.

The old building appears to have been replaced by a housing complex, which has been replaced by a new building at 275 W. Market Street. The new building was dedicated on May 2, 1976.

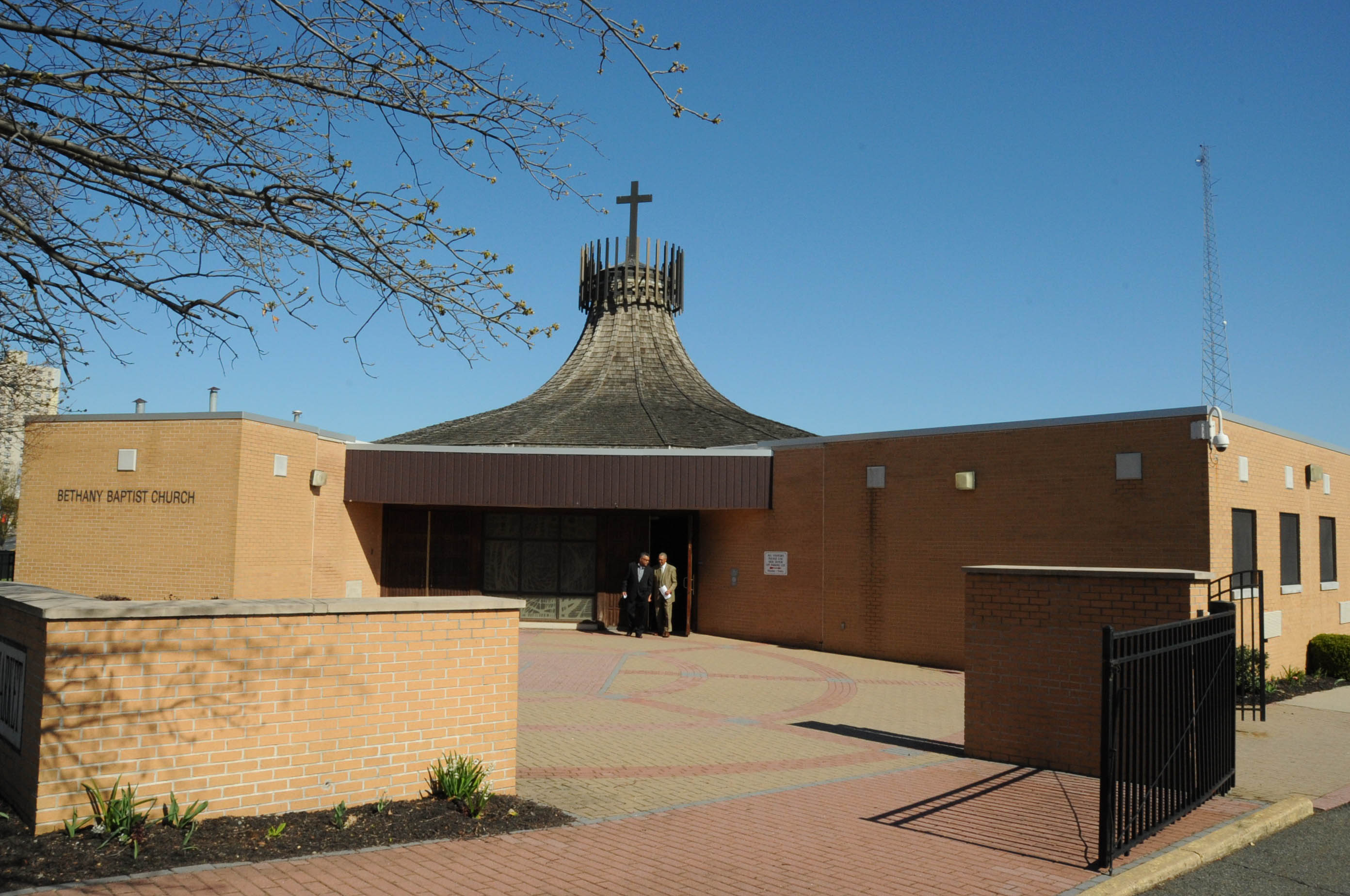
New church

== See also ==
- National Register of Historic Places listings in Essex County, New Jersey
