= Thomas Stafford =

Thomas or Tom Stafford may refer to:

- Thomas P. Stafford (1930–2024), American astronaut and Air Force general, orbited Moon on Apollo 10
- Thomas Stafford, 3rd Earl of Stafford (died 1392)
- Thomas Stafford (MP) (c. 1574–1655), illegitimate son of George Carew, 1st Earl of Totnes and MP for Weymouth and Melcombe Regis, Helston and Bodmin
- Thomas Stafford (died 1425), MP for Warwickshire
- Thomas Stafford (rebel) (1533–1557), son of Henry Stafford, 1st Baron Stafford, who was executed for high treason
- Thomas Stafford (Irish politician), Irish Fianna Fáil politician and Lord Mayor of Dublin
- Tom Stafford (astronomer), astronomer who has discovered a number of asteroids since 1997
- Tom Stafford, author of Mind Hacks

== See also ==
- Stafford (surname)
