= Will Stafford =

William Stafford (1837–1884), one of founders of the nineteenth century UK labour movement and supporter of the Liberal-Labour party. The efforts of George Odger, Francis William Soutter and Will Stafford to gain labour representation in Parliament was one of the first significant steps that would lead to the eventual formation of the UK Labour Party in 1900.

== Early life ==
Will Stafford was born in 1837 in Melton Mowbray, Leicestershire. His father, John Stafford, was a pork butcher. His mother's name was Ellen Goodacre. In his early 20s he and his brother, John Edward Stafford, walked to London. His brother would continue on to Brighton in search of work but Will Stafford stopped in Southwark.

== Personal life ==
He would meet and marry Annie Harris who had been born in the Newington Workhouse. Together they started a business selling bundles of firewood. They also started a family and by 1875 had 6 children: Ellen b.1862 John Goodacre b.1863; William b.1865; Annie b.1869; Harry b.1870; Violet b.1875.

By the 1860s Will Stafford had moved his family to a house in Southwark Bridge Road, Southwark London.

== Manufacturing career ==
Will Stafford built up a business manufacturing packing cases. By the 1870s his business would employ 40 other people.

== Political life ==
Stafford's interest in politics begun early in his life when he took an active part in the community being both a member of the St.Saviour's Guardians and the St.Saviour's Board of Works. He would become a good friend and supporter of George Odger, who played a prominent part in the early Trade Union movement.

After the Representation of the People Act 1867 the number of eligible voters doubled from 1 million to 2 million men. The new electorate were mainly working men and they would soon demand representation of their interests in Parliament. Will Stafford would be one of the newly enfranchised working men that would encourage George Odger to be the first candidate to stand for the working man.

=== The Southwark by-election ===
In 1869 Francis William Soutter was an employee and lodger of Will Stafford's. On October 24, 1869, he read in the newspaper that "The Right Hon. Austen Henry Layard, one of the members for the Metropolitan Borough of Southwark, has been appointed by Her Majesty the Queen to the post of Ambassador to the Court of Spain. The vacancy thus created in the representation of that Borough cannot be filled until Parliament meets February." Soutter was enthused and organised a meeting in a room at The Rising Sun public house near Blackfriars Bridge. To this meeting he invited Will Stafford, William Allan (the General Secretary of the Amalgamated Society of Engineers), and the South London Branch of the National Sunday League. At this meeting it was agreed that a Labour candidate be nominated for the vacant seat and that George Odger, who had earlier put his name forward as a test candidate for Stafford and then Chelsea, would be asked to accept the nomination.

George Odger accepted the nomination. The George Odger Election Committee was formed. William Allan was appointed the committee's chairman and treasurer, Will Stafford was appointed the committee's Hon. Secretary. The result of the election was Colonel Beresford (Tory) 4,686 votes; George Odger (Labour) 4,382 votes; Sir Sydney Waterlow (Liberal) 2,867 votes.

The historic 1870 by-election in Southwark was the first attempt to gain Labour representation in Parliament.

=== The Bristol by-election ===
The near success and the enthusiasm generated by the Southwark by-election of 1870 encouraged George Odger to stand in the Bristol by-election later in the year.

Will Stafford was part of the Southwark deputation that supported him at the Bristol by-election of 1870. George Odger's friends from the Southwark campaign would be asked to give up a whole week of work and pay their own rail and hotel expenses. Will Stafford was the first to volunteer and he was joined by Andrews, a butcher and Chenery, a coal seller.

This was a significant by-election as it was the first time a candidate would represent Liberal-Labour. The Liberal-Labour candidates were sponsored by Trade Unions but supported by the Liberal Party. George Odger would lose the 1870 Bristol by-election.

George Odger would stand 5 times for Parliament. His support was commendable but ultimately unsuccessful.

== Helen Taylor ==
Stafford would become a fervent supporter and companion to Helen Taylor. He would meet Helen Taylor through her involvement with the London School Board. Together they would campaign for the rights of the working man, the rights and welfare of the poor and the rights of women.

His obituary made special note of this association. "An ardent Radical, he was always to the fore in any contest in which there was hard work to be done. Along with Mr Fielding, he persistently agitated against the now defunct St.Saviour's Church Rate, and by repeatedly allowing his goods to be seized and sold, at length called public attention to its iniquity. He was always a generous supporter of the Southwark Radical Club he was also Miss Helen Taylor's right hand man in election times, and there is no doubt that it was due to his zealous efforts that Miss Taylor was so often at the top of the poll."

Will Stafford was one of Helen Taylor's most trusted advisors. Her opponents, within the Liberal Party, satirically described Will Stafford and Francis William Soutter as "Helen's Babies".
