= William Stafford-Howard =

William Stafford-Howard may refer to:

- William Stafford-Howard, 2nd Earl of Stafford (died 1733), English peer
- William Stafford-Howard, 3rd Earl of Stafford (1719–1751), English peer

== See also ==
- William Stafford (disambiguation)
- William Howard (disambiguation)
