= Harry Stafford (disambiguation) =

Harry Stafford (1869–1940) was an English footballer.

Harry Stafford may also refer to:

- Harry Stafford (motorcyclist) (born 1993), British motorcycle racer
- Harrison Stafford (1912–2004), known as Harry, American football player

== See also ==
- Godfrey Harry Stafford (1920–2013), British physicist
- Stafford (surname)
- Henry Stafford (disambiguation)
