= Robert Stafford (disambiguation) =

Robert Stafford was an American politician.

Robert Stafford may also refer to:

- Robert Stafford (MP) (fl. 1378–1383), MP for Staffordshire
- Robert de Stafford (c. 1036–1088), Norman nobleman
- Rob Stafford (born 1958), Chicago television anchor
- Robert Stafford (film editor) (1910–2003), worked on Escape to Witch Mountain
- Robert Stafford (fl. 1417–1429), Sussex chaplain who had assumed the alias of Frere Tuck

== See also ==
- Stafford (surname)
