= Bobby Goodman =

American naval fighter pilot

Robert O. Goodman
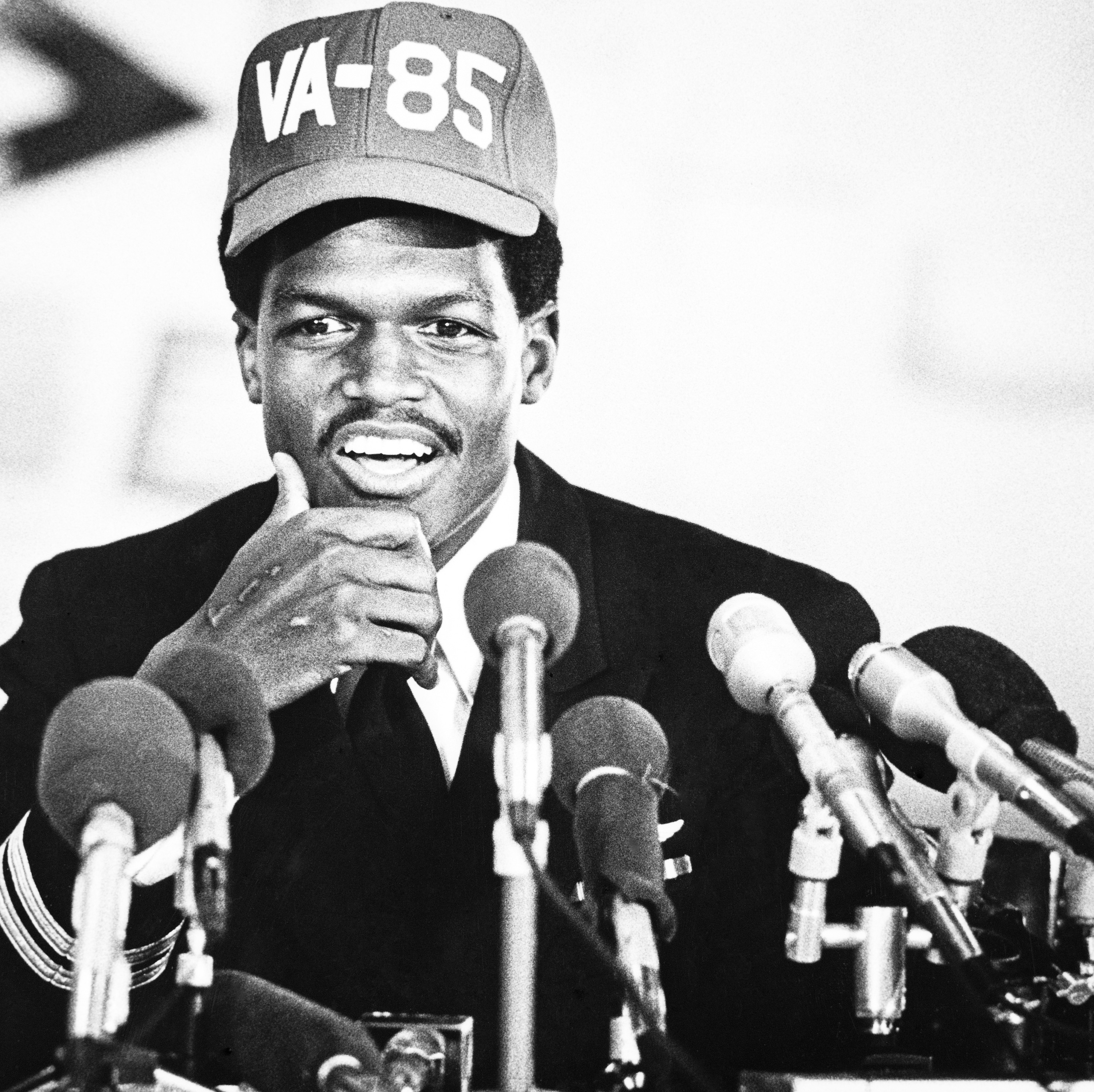
- Bobby Goodman shortly after his release, on 4 January 1984
- Born: 30 November 1956 (age 69)
- Military career
- Allegiance: United States of America
- Branch: United States Navy
- Service years: 1978–1995
- Rank: Commander
- Nickname: Bobby
- Unit: VA-85
- Conflicts: Lebanese Civil War; Gulf War
- Awards: Prisoner of War Medal

Robert O. Goodman (born 30 November 1956) is a former United States Navy bombardier–navigator. He was shot down in his A-6 Intruder over Lebanon on 4 December 1983. Captured upon ejection from his stricken plane, he was held captive for 30 days. His release on 3 January 1984 was facilitated by Jesse Jackson.

== Early life ==
Goodman was born in San Juan, Puerto Rico on 30 November 1956. He is a 1978 graduate of the US Naval Academy. His father is a retired Air Force Lieutenant Colonel.

== Background ==
In October 1983, aircraft carrier USS John F. Kennedy (CV-67) was diverted to Beirut, Lebanon, from her planned Indian Ocean deployment, after the Beirut barracks bombing killed 241 US military personnel of the Multinational Force in Lebanon. The ship spent the rest of that year and early 1984 patrolling the region. On 4 December, in response to two U.S. Navy F-14 Tomcat fighter aircraft having been fired upon the previous day, ten A-6 Intruders of VA-85 Black Falcons along with A-6 and A-7 Corsair aircraft from USS Independence (CV-62) took part in a bombing raid over Beirut.

== Capture ==
While on a bombing mission, the two-man crew from VA-85 was hit by an infrared homing missile (SA-7 or SA-9) into the engine nozzle upon dropping its bomb load, while still in a dive through 1,800 feet (554 m) AGL. The fuselage and a wing were immediately engulfed in flames, and then the right engine erupted.

The pilot, Lieutenant Mark Lange, tried to control the aircraft in order to safely eject the crew. After a rapid, low-level descent, the Intruder was seen to pull up and likely stalled, resulting in a crash on a hill at 1,000 ft MSL, near a village surrounded by Syrian anti-aircraft artillery positions. Lange ejected both himself and Goodman in the final moment, but his parachute failed to properly deploy before he hit the ground. Lange's left leg was severely injured and he died shortly after capture by Syrian troops and Lebanese civilians. Goodman, rendered unconscious, broke three ribs, and injured a shoulder and a knee during the landing, but was otherwise stable. He was captured and awakened by the Syrians and taken to Damascus.

== Captivity ==
Goodman was held for more than a month, during which the U.S. government made numerous attempts to free him. He had a few visitors, including Ambassador Robert Paganelli who brought him Christmas dinner.

== Release ==
In December 1983, Jesse Jackson traveled to Syria with a delegation that included; Reverend Wyatt T. Walker, Louis Farrakhan, Jack Mendelson, Thelma C.D. Adair, Reverend M. William Howard Jr., Florence Tate (Press Secretary), Julia Jones (Photographer), Thomas Porter, Jesse Jackson Jr., Jonathan Jackson, and others. The mission's peaceful purpose was accomplished, as they secured the release of Goodman.

== White House reception ==
On 4 January 1984, U.S. president Ronald Reagan welcomed Lt. Goodman at the White House, hours after he and Rev. Jackson arrived back in the U.S.

Reagan said Lt. Goodman "exemplified qualities of leadership and loyalty" and said Jackson's "mission of mercy" had "earned our gratitude and our admiration." In turn, Jackson praised Reagan for sending a letter to Syrian president Assad calling for cooperation in bringing peace to Lebanon.

== Aftermath ==
Following captivity, release, and return to the United States, Goodman remained in active service.

Goodman was featured in an episode of Wings Over the Gulf ("In Harm's Way", 1992) in which he discussed his experiences in the Gulf War of 1991 with Iraq, flying the A-6 Intruder.

Goodman retired with the rank of commander in 1995. He subsequently became a business owner in Colorado Springs, Colorado.
