= Henry Stafford =

Henry Stafford may refer to:

- Sir Henry Stafford (died 1471) (c.1425–1471), 3rd husband of Margaret Beaufort, Countess of Richmond and Derby
- Henry Stafford, 2nd Duke of Buckingham (1455–1483), executed for conspiring against Richard III
- Henry Stafford, 1st Baron Stafford (1501–1563), English baron
- Henry Stafford, 2nd Baron Stafford (died 1566), English baron
- Henry Stafford, 1st Earl of Wiltshire (1479–1533), English nobleman, brother of Henry VIII's mistress, Anne Stafford
- Henry Stafford-Jerningham, 9th Baron Stafford (1802–1844)
- Henry Stafford (MP) (fl. 1541–1555), English politician, member of parliament for Stafford

== See also ==
- Stafford (surname)
- Harry Stafford (disambiguation)
