= Edmund Stafford (disambiguation) =

Edmund Stafford may refer to:

- Edmund Stafford (1344–1419), bishop of Exeter
- Edmund Stafford, 1st Baron Stafford (1272–1308), British nobleman who was summoned to parliament by King Edward I
- Edmund Stafford, 5th Earl of Stafford (1377–1398), British nobleman

== See also ==
- Stafford (surname)
- Stafford (disambiguation)
