= John Stafford =

John Stafford may refer to:

- John Stafford (Leicester MP) represented Leicester (UK Parliament constituency)
- John Stafford (bishop) (died 1452), English politician & archbishop
- John Stafford (died 1624), MP for Wareham and Stafford
- John Stafford (Irish politician) (born 1944), former Irish Fianna Fáil party politician
- John Stafford (American politician) (born 1940), American Republican politician from Maryland
- John Stafford, 1st Earl of Wiltshire (1427–1473), English nobleman
- John Stafford (producer) (1893–1967), British film producer
- John Stafford (baseball) (1870–1940), pitcher in Major League Baseball
- John Stafford (sport shooter), English sport shooter
- Matthew Stafford (John Matthew Stafford, born 1988), American football quarterback
- Jack Stafford (umpire) (John E. Stafford, 1879–1946), professional baseball umpire

== See also ==
- John Stafford Smith (1750–1836), British composer
- Jonathan Stafford, American retired ballet dancer and artistic director of New York City Ballet
- Stafford (disambiguation)
