= Bill Howard (journalist) =

American Catholic journalist

- Born: Princeton, N.J.
- Occupation: Journalist/Editor

William Patrick Howard (born in Princeton, New Jersey) is a Catholic journalist who is media director for The Cor Project. He is formerly the editor in chief of The Colorado Catholic Herald for the Roman Catholic Diocese of Colorado Springs and producer and engineer of Bishop Michael John Sheridan's weekly Catholic radio show, Bishop Sheridan Presents.

== Biography ==
Raised in New Jersey, Howard graduated from Holy Cross High School in Delran in 1987 and from the University of Scranton (Pennsylvania) in 1991 with majors in Philosophy and English, and a concentration in communications. From 1988 to 1990, he was sports editor of the student newspaper, The Aquinas.

=== Secular journalism experience ===
Howard joined Forbes Newspapers in Somerville, New Jersey, in July 1992 and served as the primary sportswriter and copy editor of The Metuchen-Edison Review and Highland Park Herald weekly community newspapers. In January 1995, he joined the staff of College Sports magazine in Whitehouse Station, N.J., where he was the primary copy editor of seven professional and college sports yearbooks, and a copy editor and occasional contributor to College Sports monthly magazine. He continued his sportswriting as a feature writer for publications by the National Hockey League's Dallas Stars, Major League Baseball's Texas Rangers and Mesquite Championship Rodeo from 1997 to 2005.

=== Catholic press experience ===
In the summer of 1997, Howard moved to Dallas, Texas, and joined the Dallas Diocese semimonthly newspaper Texas Catholic as a staff writer. He eventually became the news editor and helped found the paper's website and blog. He left Texas Catholic in the spring of 2005 to become editor of The Colorado Catholic Herald. During his time at Texas Catholic he won seven Catholic Press Association (CPA) awards, two Katie awards from the Dallas Press Club, and covered in person the death of Pope John Paul II from Poland and the subsequent papal conclave in Rome in April 2005.

Bishop Sheridan hired Howard to restructure operations and redesign the Colorado Springs diocesan newspaper in June 2005. With a staff of four, The Catholic Herald added "Colorado" to its name and upgraded its frequency from monthly to twice a month (first and third Fridays). In May 2006, the Herald won the CPA's First Place General Excellence award in its circulation category (17,001-40,000 households), the highest award the paper can win. From 2006 until his departure in 2014, the Herald had won two dozen CPA awards. Circulation of the Herald remained steady at nearly 30,000 registered households. During this time, Howard also expanded the Herald's reach by adding a radio studio to the office, and brought the Herald into social media. Among his editorial highlights are covering Pope Benedict XVI's return to Bavaria, Germany, in the fall of 2006 and World Youth Day in Sydney, Australia, in 2008.

In 2010, Howard was elected to the Catholic Press Association board of directors for a three-year term, and was re-elected in 2013. In 2012, he was named co-chair of the 2013 Catholic Media Conference, held in Denver June 19–21.

In November 2014, he became the media director for The Cor Project, a Theology of the Body-focused apostolate founded by Christopher West.

=== Other ===
He is the older brother of Dr. Peter Howard, founder of The Catholic Hour apostolate, the Fulton Sheen Society in Aspen, Colorado and is cofounder of the Heroic Families apostolate. He is also a member of the board of directors for SCOPE Foundation, composed of University of Scranton alumni who raise operational funds for a Catholic elementary school, Santa Luisa, in the poorest section of San Salvador, El Salvador.
