= M. William Howard Jr. =

American minister

Moses William Howard, Jr. (born March 3, 1946, in Americus, Georgia) is an American cleric, former college president, community and business leader. He is known for his involvement in ecumenical organizations domestically and internationally and in international affairs, especially within the Middle East and Southern Africa. He is the son of the late Laura Turner Howard and the late Moses William Howard, Sr. He attended public schools in Americus before enrolling in Morehouse College, where he graduated in 1968. He earned a Master of Divinity degree at Princeton Theological Seminary in 1972. His worldview was shaped initially in response to the racial segregation he experienced in his hometown, where he participated in voter registration drives in the early 1960s. He studied Philosophy and Psychology at Morehouse and was heavily influenced by Professors Samuel Woodrow Williams and Lucius M. Tobin (https://kinginstitute.stanford.edu/king-papers/documents/lucius-m-tobin-charles-e-batten). His principal academic advisor at Princeton was Professor Edward Jabra Jurgi.

== Career ==
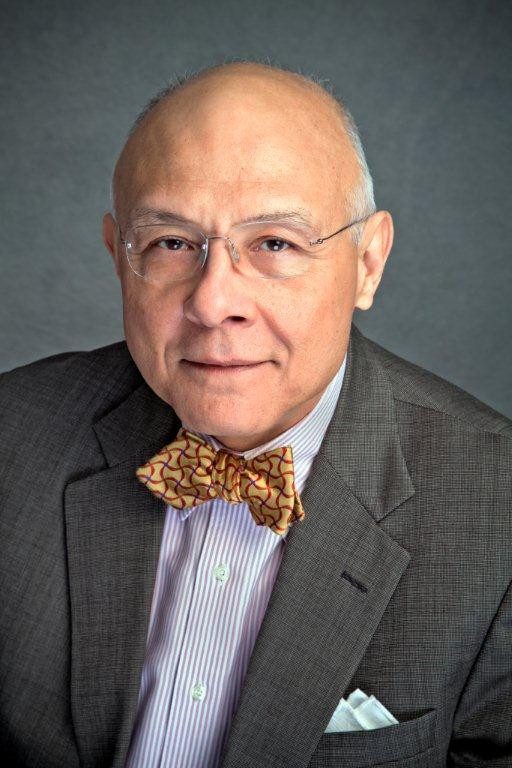
M. William Howard, Jr.

After Princeton, Howard joined the national staff of the Reformed Church in America (RCA) in 1972, where he remained until assuming the presidency of New York Theological Seminary (NYTS) in 1992. During his tenure at the RCA, he served as an Advisor to the 5th Assembly of the World Council of Churches (WCC) in Nairobi, Kenya and as Moderator of the WCC's Programme to Combat Racism (1976–78). In 1978, at age 32 he was elected the youngest president of the National Council of Churches, and in that capacity at Christmas in 1979, he journeyed with Bishop Thomas Gumbleton, Auxiliary Bishop of the Archdiocese of Detroit, and the Reverend William Sloane Coffin, Senior Minister of The Riverside Church, to conduct Christmas services for the U.S. personnel being held hostage Iran. In 1984, he travelled to Syria as chair of an ecumenical delegation that accompanied the Reverend Jesse Jackson to obtain the release of U. S. Naval Officer Robert O. Goodman.

During his tenure at NYTS, the Seminary inaugurated two academic partnerships with area graduate schools in social work and urban studies, doubled its endowment, and won the Arthur Vining Davis Foundations Award for Excellence.

Howard was a member of the Council on Foreign Relations for over 20 years. He held an elected position on the Board of Directors of New Jersey Resources from 2005 to 2022, and was a member of the Rutgers University Board of Governors from 2003 to 2013. He chaired the university's Board from 2007 to 2010. He served as a trustee of the National Urban League from 1981 to 1988 and of the Children's Defense Fund from 1980 to 1985. In 2007, he chaired the New Jersey Death Penalty Study Commission, which led to the abolition of the death penalty in that state.

Howard was pastor of Bethany Baptist Church, established in 1871 as the first Baptist church founded by African Americans in Newark, from 2000 to 2015. He was ordained at Rockford, Illinois' Pilgrim Baptist Church in 1974 by the American Baptist Churches, USA. He has received several keys to cities and has been awarded honorary degrees from Morehouse College, Miles College, Central College, Bloomfield College. Rutgers University, and Essex County College.

Since 2016, he has worked with for-profit and not-for-profit organizations on issues of governance, management and leadership.

In 2020, Black, Not Dutch was published by Africa World Press. This is Dr. Howard's account of how the Reformed Church in America responded to the Black Manifesto and its demand for reparations to African Americans for slavery and subsequent oppression.

In 2022, Howard joined with other residents of his community in demonstrating how a diverse community can live together, employing values of justice, fair play and mutual respect. They have led the community in conversations related to reparations for the enslavement of Africans in America; protecting public schools from efforts to limit instruction in the history and culture of diverse populations; affordable housing; opposition to book banning; gun safety; the Township’s Master Plan; treatment of local students with different sexual orientation; and recognition of African American history in the region, all topics deemed vital to engagement of the kind that strengthens community.

== International engagements ==
For most of the 1970s and 1980s, Howard played a role in the movement for freedom from colonialism and white minority rule in Southern Africa (Zimbabwe, Namibia, and South Africa) and the former Portuguese colonies. From 1975 until 1990, the year of Nelson Mandela's release from prison, Howard was denied visas to enter the Republic of South Africa by the apartheid government. During this period, he chaired the Board of the American Committee on Africa; he presided at the United Nations-sponsored North American Regional Conference for Action Against Apartheid in 1984, and the 1981 United Nations Seminar on Bank Loans to South Africa in Zurich, Switzerland. In 1985, he stood with New Jersey Governor Thomas Kean when he signed a bill divesting State holdings of some $2 billion from companies doing business in South Africa. With Henry F. Henderson, a New Jersey businessman and Commissioner of the Port Authority of NY/NJ, Howard founded Management Futures, an initiative that provided internships to black South Africans in fields from which they had been excluded under the Job Reservations Act.

Howard led the first post-revolution, American church delegation to the Christian Council of Cuba in 1977 and the first such delegation to the churches of the People's Republic of China after the Cultural Revolution. In 1985, he was a special guest of the Women's Protestant Federation of Germany on the 40th year observance of the fall of the Third Reich. He addressed the 4th Assembly of the All Africa Conference of Churches in Kenya in 1981.

== Personal life ==
Howard married Barbara J. Wright in 1970. They are the parents of three children.

== Jazz aficionado ==
A jazz enthusiast and collector, Howard has a particular interest in the intersection of Spirituals, Blues, and Jazz. While pastor at Bethany, he inspired the start of a Jazz Vespers, which included world renown jazz musicians in worship. He has been pastor to Jazz greats Earl May (bassist), Geri Allen (pianist), and Dorthaan Kirk (promoter).

== Selected awards ==
- Toussaint L'Ouverture Freedom Award, Haitian Community, 1980
- Distinguished Alumnus Award, Princeton Theological Seminary, 1982
- New Jersey Citizen Action Award "International Human Rights Activist", 1985
- Outstanding Achievement Award, New York City, NAACP, 1993
- The Bennie Award for Achievement, from Morehouse College, 2008
- Several honorary degrees and keys to cities have been awarded
- Council of Elders, New Jersey Performing Arts Center, 2021
- Named to the list of 2021 "Most Influential Corporate Directors", Savoy Magazine
