= Erik Stafford =

American economist

Erik Stafford is an American economist currently the John A. Paulson Professor at Harvard Business School.
