= Multinational Force in Lebanon =

International peacekeeping force in Lebanon from 1982 to 1984

Multinational Force Beirut – Lebanon
- Force multinationale de sécurité à Beyrouth (French); Forza Multinazionale in Libano (Italian)
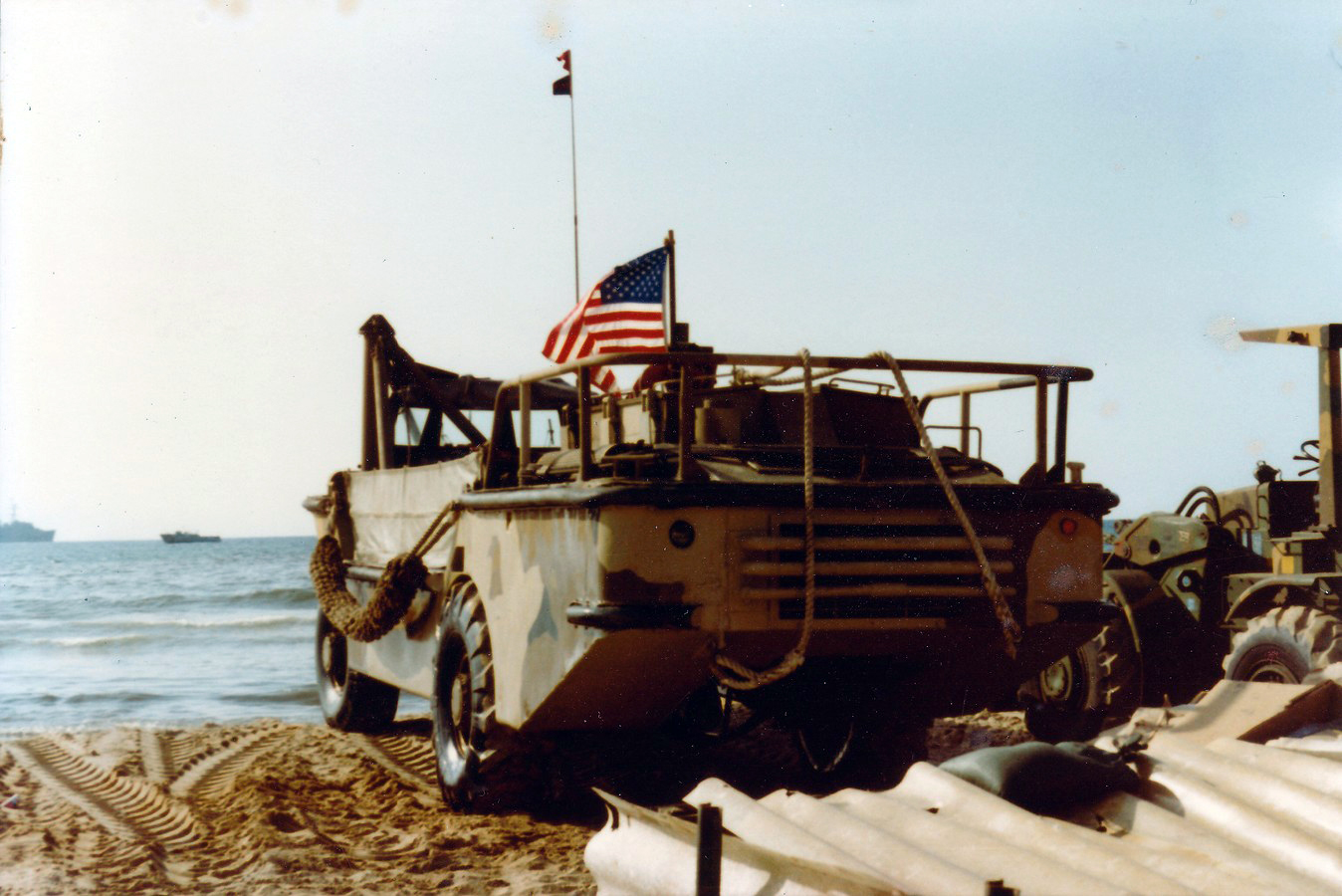
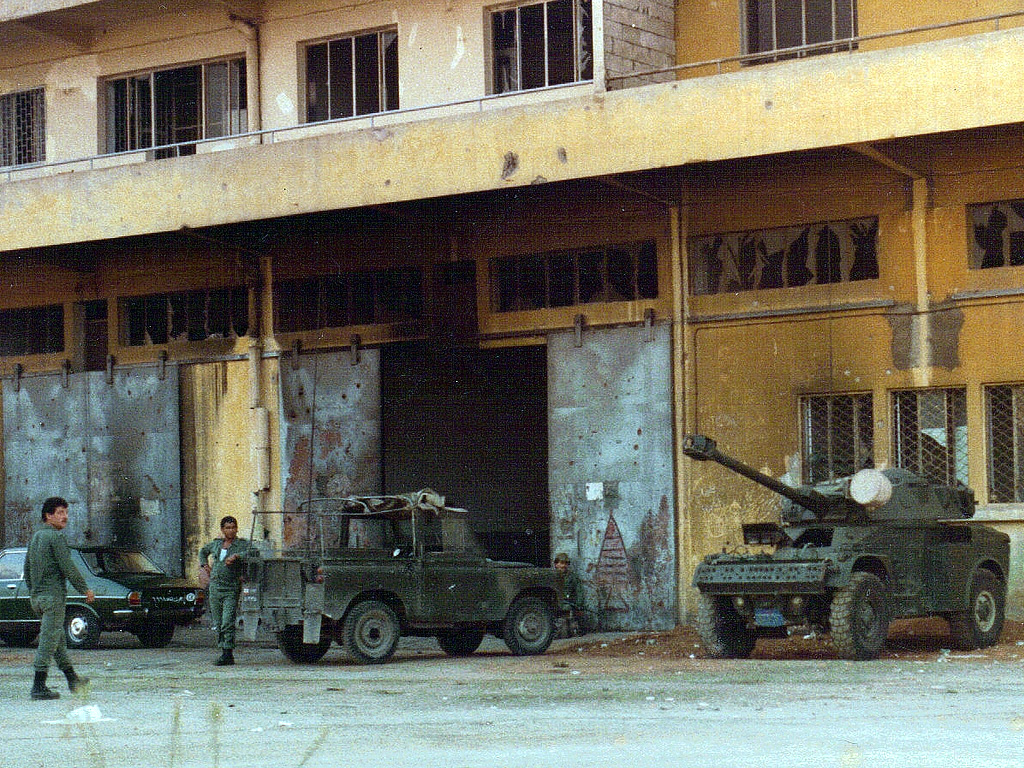
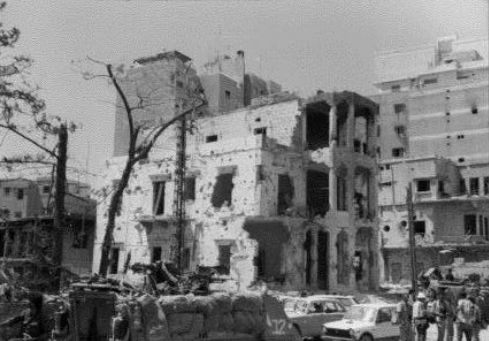
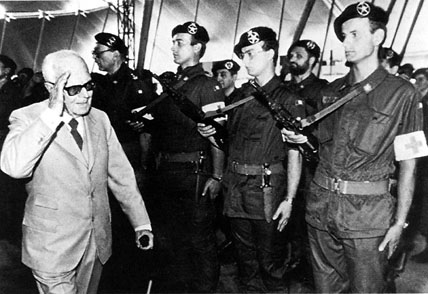
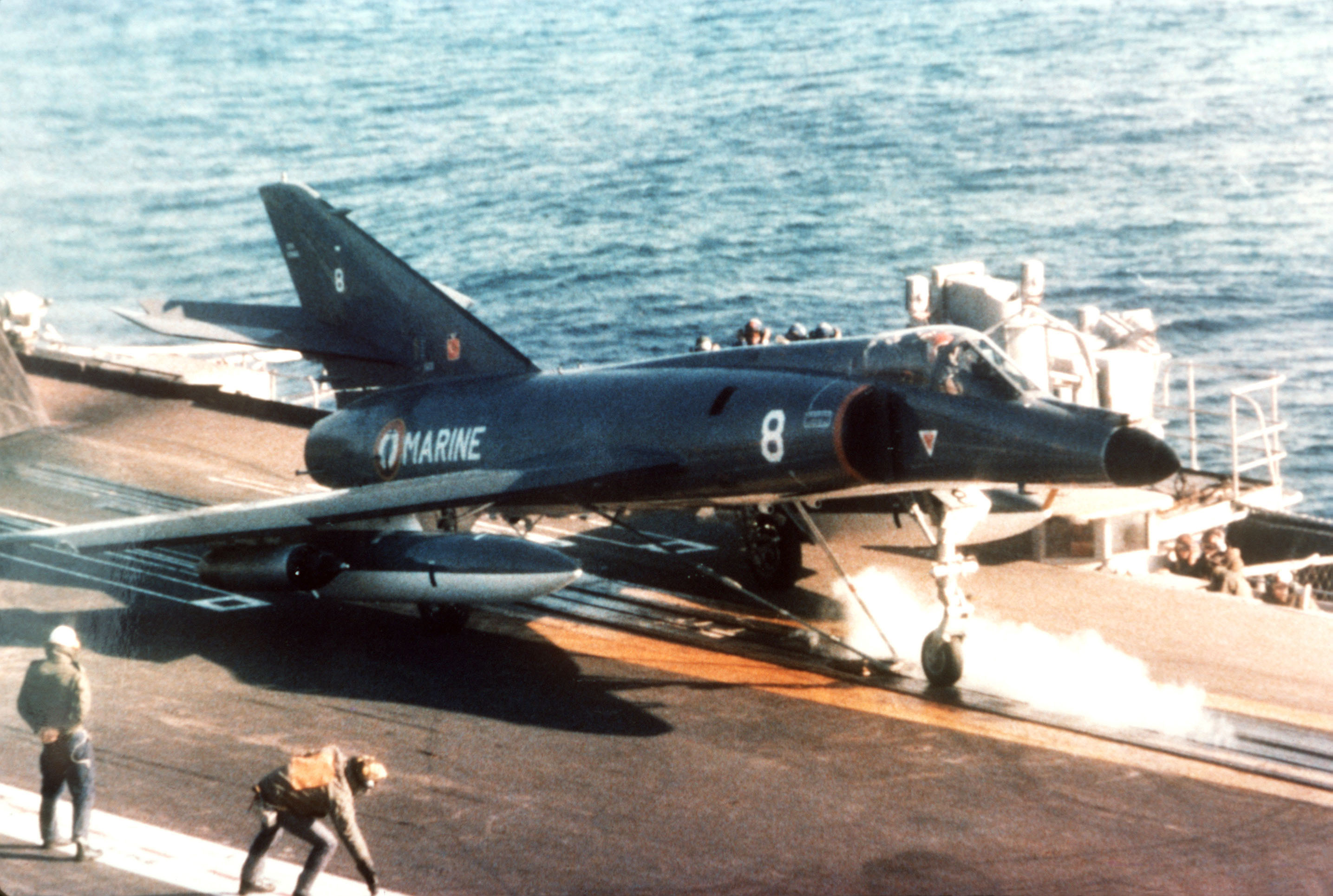
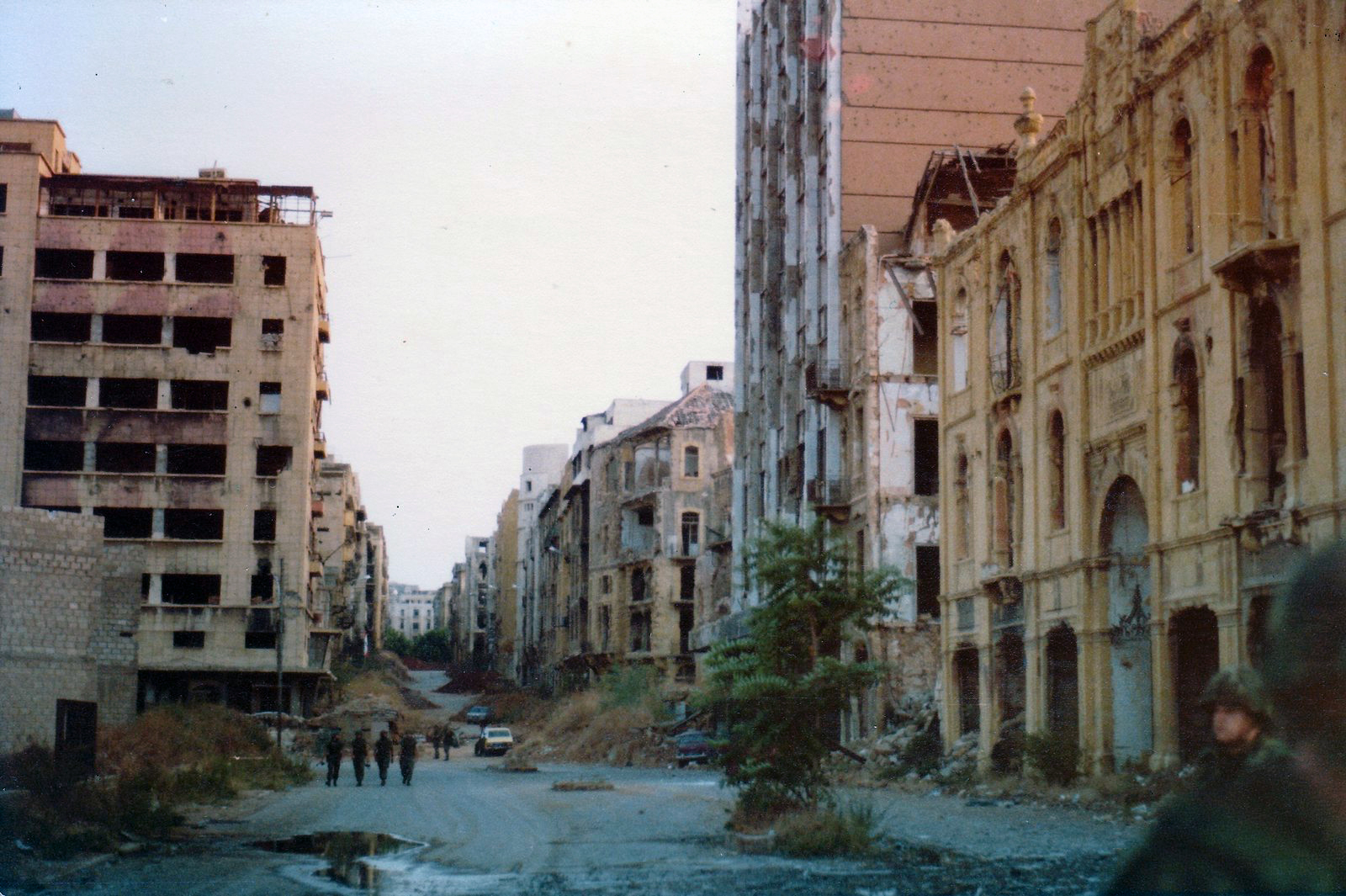
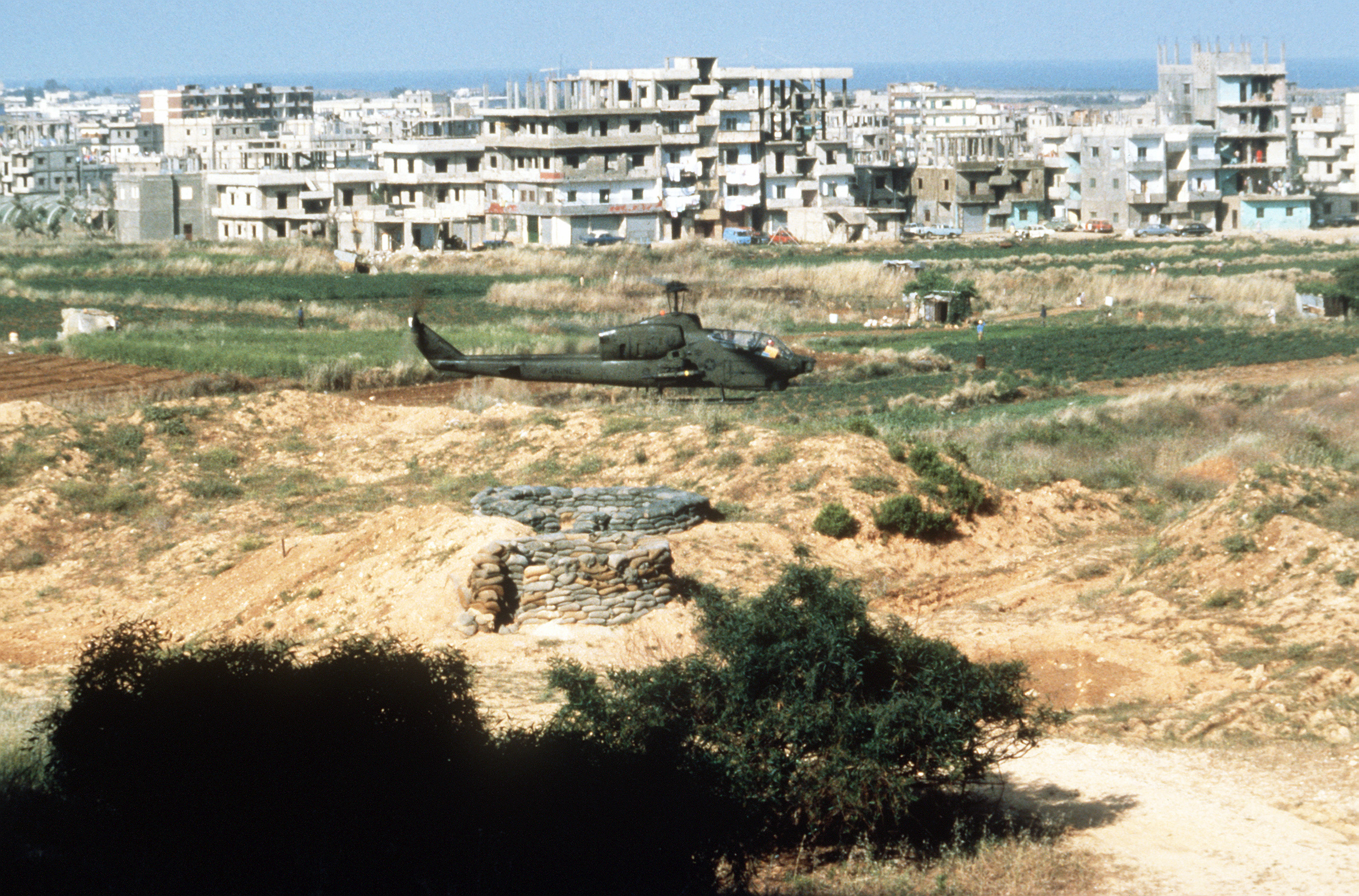
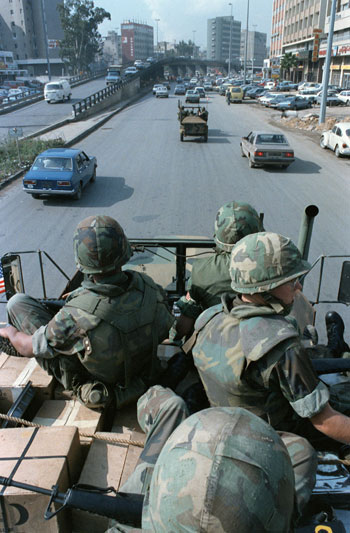
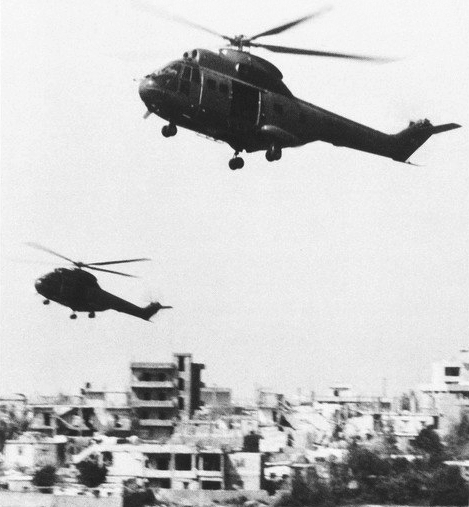
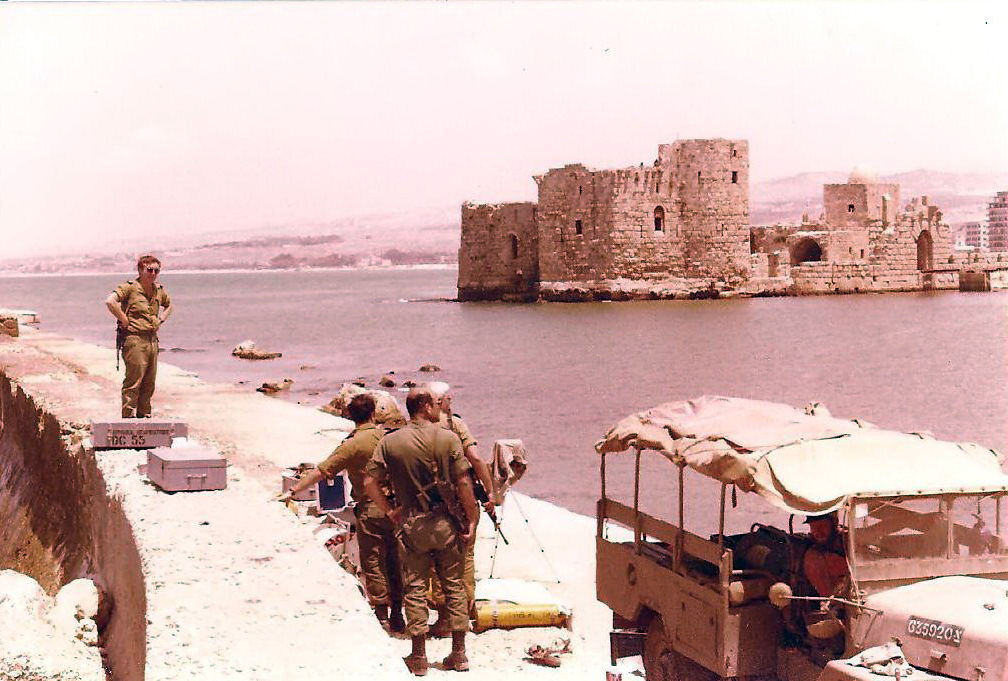
- Clockwise from top left: United States Navy LARC-V landing in Beirut, September 1982; Lebanese Army in Beirut, 1982; Italian President Sandro Pertini in Lebanon during a visit to the Italian contingent in 1983; PLO office in Sidon, 1982; Fighter jet taking off from French aircraft carrier Foch off the coast of Lebanon, 1983; French Aérospatiale SA 330 Puma helicopters in Beirut, Lebanon, 1983; USMC Bell AH-1T SeaCobra helicopter on patrol outside the city of Beirut, May 1983; U.S. Marines on patrol in Beirut, April 1983; Israeli troops in Sidon, August 1982; Green Line, Beirut 1982
- Active: August 25, 1982 – March 31, 1984
- Disbanded: March 1984
- Countries: United States; France; Italy; United Kingdom
- Role: Peacekeeping mission Interposition force
- Garrison/HQ: Beirut, Lebanon
- Engagements: Lebanese Civil War

Commanders
- USMNF (Task Force 62) (August 1982 – February 1984): Col. James M. Mead; 32nd MAU (August – October 1982) Col. Thomas M. Stokes, Jr. 24th MAU (October 1982 – February 1983); Col. James M. Mead; 22nd MAU (February – May 1983); Col. Timothy J. Geraghty; 24th MAU (May – November 1983); 31st MAU (September – October 1983) BGen. Jim R. Joy; 22nd MAU (November 1983 – February 1984)
- British Forces (February 1983 – February 1984): Lt. Col. John de P. Ferguson; 1st The Queen's Dragoon Guards (September 1983 – January 1984)
- French Forces (August 1982 – March 1984): 11th Airborne Division, B. Gen. Jacques Granger (August – September 1982) 11th Airborne Division, B. Gen. Jacques Granger (September 1982 – January 1983); 9th Marine Infantry Division, BGen. Michel Datin (January – May 1983); 31st Brigade, B. Gen. Jean-Claude Coulon (May – September 1983); 11th Airborne Division, B. Gen. Francois Cann (September 1983 – January 1984) 9th Marine Infantry Division, B. Gen. Datin (February – March 1984)
- Italian Forces (August 1982 – January 1984): Paratroopers Brigade Folgore and San Marco Battalion, B. Gen. Franco Angioni (August 1982 – January 1984)

Insignia
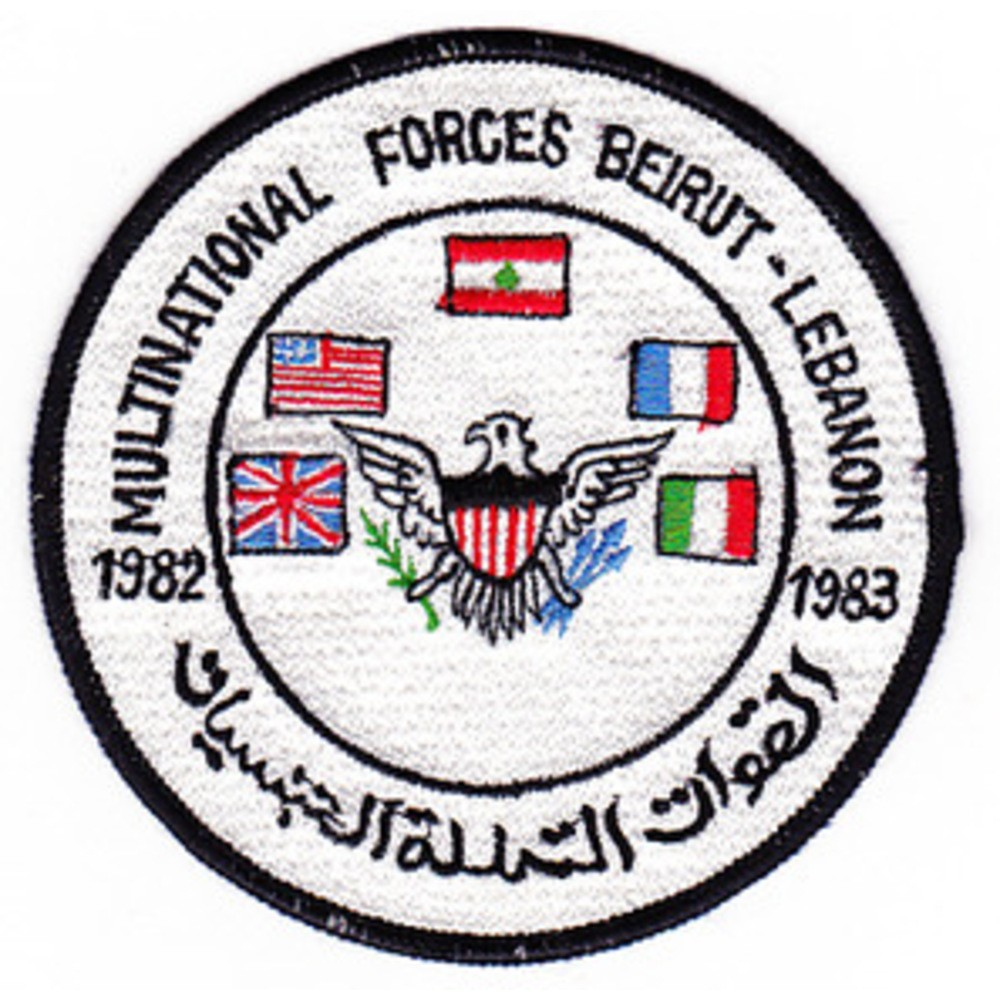
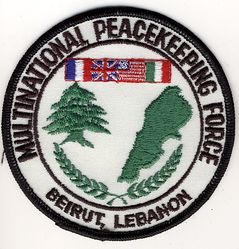
- Patches: 1982–83 Patch/Multinational Peacekeeping Force (II) Patch

The Multinational Force in Lebanon (MNF) was an international peacekeeping force created in August 1982 following a 1981 U.S.-brokered ceasefire between the Palestine Liberation Organization (PLO) and Israel to end their involvement in the conflict between Lebanon's pro-government and pro-Syrian factions. The ceasefire held until June 3, 1982, when the Abu Nidal Organization attempted to assassinate Shlomo Argov, Israel's ambassador to London. Israel blamed the PLO and three days later invaded Lebanon. West Beirut was besieged for seven weeks before the PLO acceded to a new agreement for their withdrawal. The agreement provided for the deployment of a Multinational Force to assist the Lebanese Armed Forces in evacuating the PLO, Syrian forces and other foreign combatants involved in Lebanon's civil war.

The four-nation MNF was created as an interposition force meant to oversee the peaceful withdrawal of the PLO. The participants included the U.S. Multinational Force (USMNF), which consisted of four different Marine Amphibious Units (MAUs); British 1st Queens Dragoon Guards armoured reconnaissance regiment; the 1st inter-arm Foreign and French Brigade, 4 Foreign Legion Regiments, 28 French Armed Forces regiments including French and Foreign paratroopers, units of the National Gendarmerie, Italian paratroopers from the Folgore Brigade, infantry units from the Bersaglieri regiments and Marines of the San Marco Regiment. Additionally, the MNF was in charge of training various units of the Lebanese Armed Forces.

The relatively benign environment at the beginning of the mission gave way to chaos as the civil war re-escalated following the assassination of President-elect Bashir Gemayel in September 1982. Subsequent political and military developments on the ground caused the MNF to be viewed not as a peacekeeper, but as a belligerent. In early 1984, after it became apparent that the government of Lebanon was no longer able to impose its will on warring factions as they entered Beirut and hostilities renewed, the MNF ended its presence mission in Beirut and went offshore before completely leaving Lebanon in July of the same year in the aftermath of the October 1983 barracks bombing that killed 241 U.S. and 58 French servicemen. It was replaced by the United Nations Interim Force in Lebanon (UNIFIL) already present in Lebanon since 1978.

== Mission ==
The mission of the multinational force was to ensure the withdrawal of all foreign forces; aid, support and train the Lebanese Armed Forces to restore the sovereignty of the Lebanese Government at the request of the latter in Beirut and the promotion of national unity and reconciliation, along with strengthening all national institutions, including the army.

The United States, France, Italy and the United Kingdom contributed to the peacekeeping operations pursuant to the MNF mandate which reads as follows:

The MNF (multinational force) is to provide an interposition force at agreed locations and thereby provide the MNF presence requested by the Government of Lebanon to assist it and Lebanon's armed forces in the Beirut area. This presence will facilitate the restoration of Lebanese Government sovereignty and authority over the Beirut area and thereby further its efforts to assure the safety of persons in the area and to bring to an end the violence which has tragically recurred.

== Responsibilities, activities, and composition ==
Under its mandate, the MNF provided a multinational presence requested by the Lebanese Government to assist it and the Lebanese Armed Forces in the Beirut area. The MNF was not authorized to engage in combat but might exercise the right of self-defense. The USMNF followed a policy of active self-defense in response to attacks and to improve its security. In order to enhance the safety of MNF personnel, authority had been given to U.S. naval forces offshore to provide naval gunfire and air support against any units in Syrian-controlled parts of Lebanon firing into greater Beirut as well as against any units directly attacking MNF or U.S. personnel and facilities.

The MNF was composed of the following units, which perform the functions indicated at the request of the Lebanese Government. Their precise functions within the MNF mission have varied over time and continued to be subject to adjustment in light of changing circumstances.

- One U.S. Marine Amphibious Unit (MAU) was ashore at Beirut International Airport as a 1,400-man force which also provided external-security troops at U.S. diplomatic facilities in the greater Beirut area. Additional elements of the MAU in reserve, mainly combat support and combat service support elements, were aboard amphibious ships offshore Beirut. Pending the conclusion of consultations with the Government of Lebanon and Western allies, this force would be redeployed as soon as conditions warranted, with a tentative goal of completion within 30 days. As noted above, U.S. military personnel then with the MNF would remain on the ground for the protection of their remaining personnel.
- Two Italian battalions were in a 1,400-man force in southwest Beirut and also help protect the Sabra and Shatila refugee camps. The Italian Government had nearly completed the four-month process of returning the size of its force to that level from a high of 2,200 men. The Italians announced on Feb 8 their intention to withdraw further forces but to leave a portion of their MNF contingent to protect the camp areas.
- The French battalions served as a force in and near the port of Beirut. The French had returned approximately 460 personnel from the MNF to the United Nations Interim Force in Lebanon (UNIFIL) in southern Lebanon, which left them at a level of 1,600 men, well above their original troop commitment.
- One British mechanised reconnaissance squadron of 100 men withdrew from their position east of Beirut International Airport on Feb 8 and embarked in a Royal Navy ship offshore until the situation clarifies.

In addition, each contingent of the MNF had naval and/or air support forces in the region.

== History ==
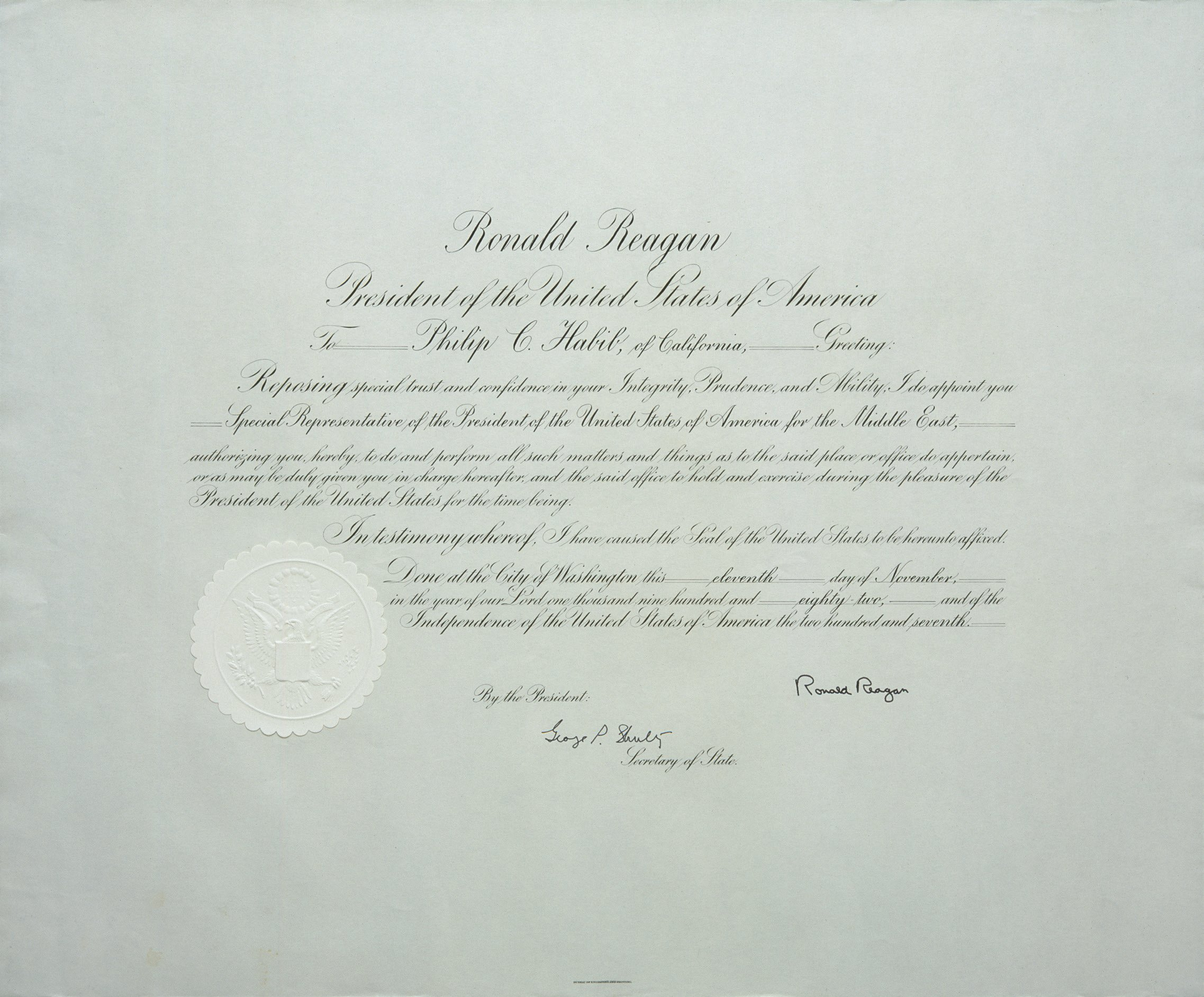
Commission for Philip Habib for his trip as Special Representative of the President of the United States for the Middle East in 1982, signed by President Ronald Reagan and Secretary of State George P. Shultz

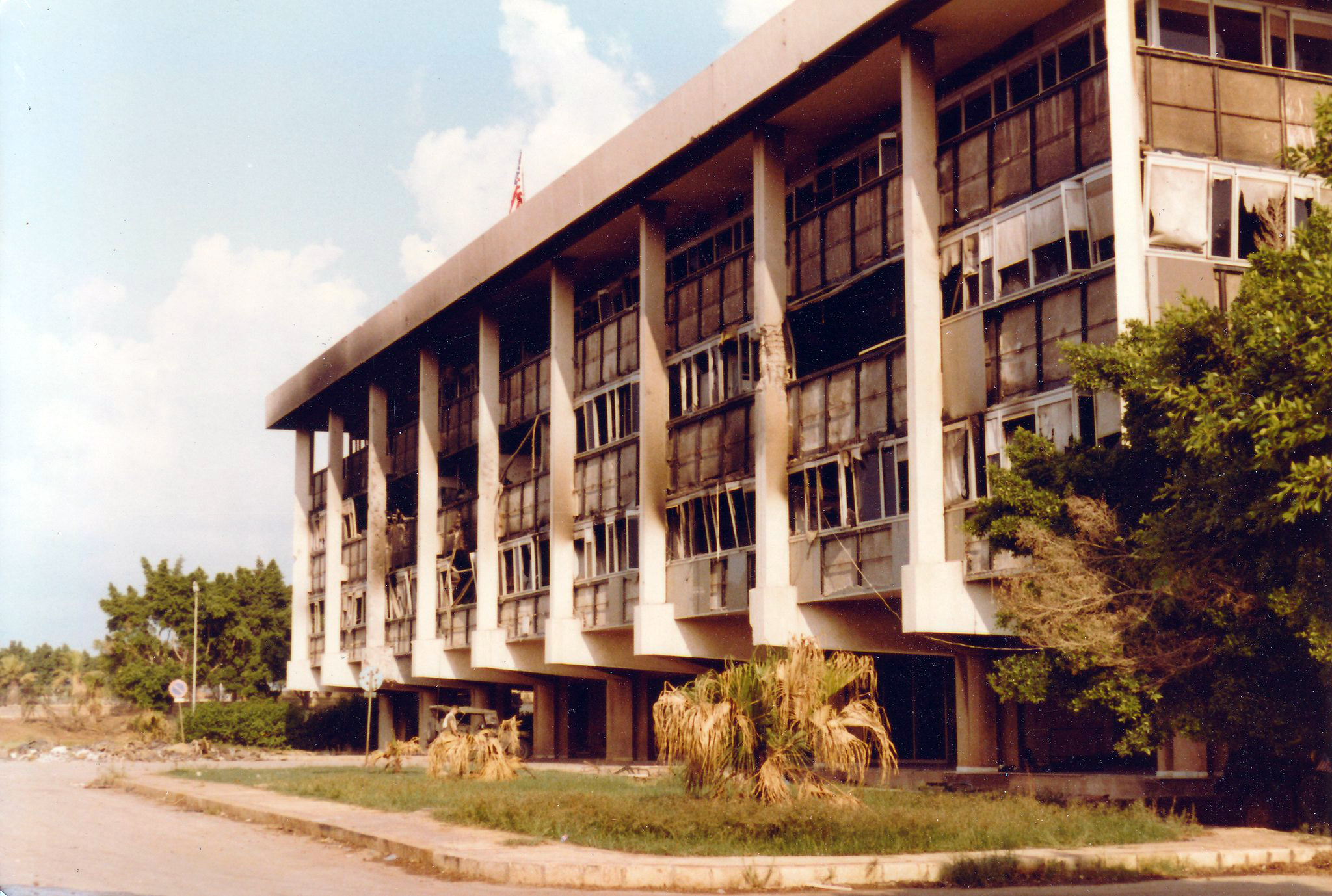
The United States Marine Corps barracks in Beirut, 1982

The United States had previously been involved in Lebanon during the 1958 crisis. In the aftermath of the Suez Crisis, Lebanese President Camille Chamoun faced an ordeal in 1956 when Muslim leaders demanded that he break relations with Britain and France, which had just attacked Egypt over rights to the Suez Canal. In May 1958 armed rebellion broke out in Beirut, supported mostly by Muslim elements. In July, a bloody coup in Iraq overthrew the monarchy and established a military regime allied with Egypt and Syria, fearing a similar takeover by leftists with ties to Egypt and Syria in his nation—where Muslim factions were opposed to the pro-Western government and demanding that Lebanon join the Nasser-led, Soviet-backed United Arab Republic, Chamoun sent an urgent appeal for help to the American Government. The United States subsequently entered Lebanon with the announced purpose of both protecting American nationals and preserving the integrity and independence of the country in the face of internal opposition and external threats. 14,000 U.S. Marines and paratroopers were sent to Lebanon by President Dwight D. Eisenhower to keep the country from falling to Communism. President Chamoun left office in September after having completed his term and a successor had peacefully been selected.

In April 1975, an attempt on the life of Pierre Gemayel, a prominent Maronite figure, sparked clashes between Palestinian and Christian militias and was widely seen as having set off the Lebanese Civil War. Further instability ensued when Israel invaded Lebanon in June 1982, the invasion targeted the Palestine Liberation Organization (PLO) bases in Beirut.

As the capital city Beirut was besieged by the Israelis, U.S. special envoy Philip Habib negotiated with the warring parties for an end to the fighting and for the creation of an international peacekeeping force to oversee their evacuation. In August 1982, he was successful in bringing about an agreement for the evacuation of Syrian troops and PLO fighters from Beirut. The agreement also provided for the deployment of a three-nation Multinational Force during the period of the evacuation.

== Joint Security Evacuation Operations ==
=== Beirut I ===
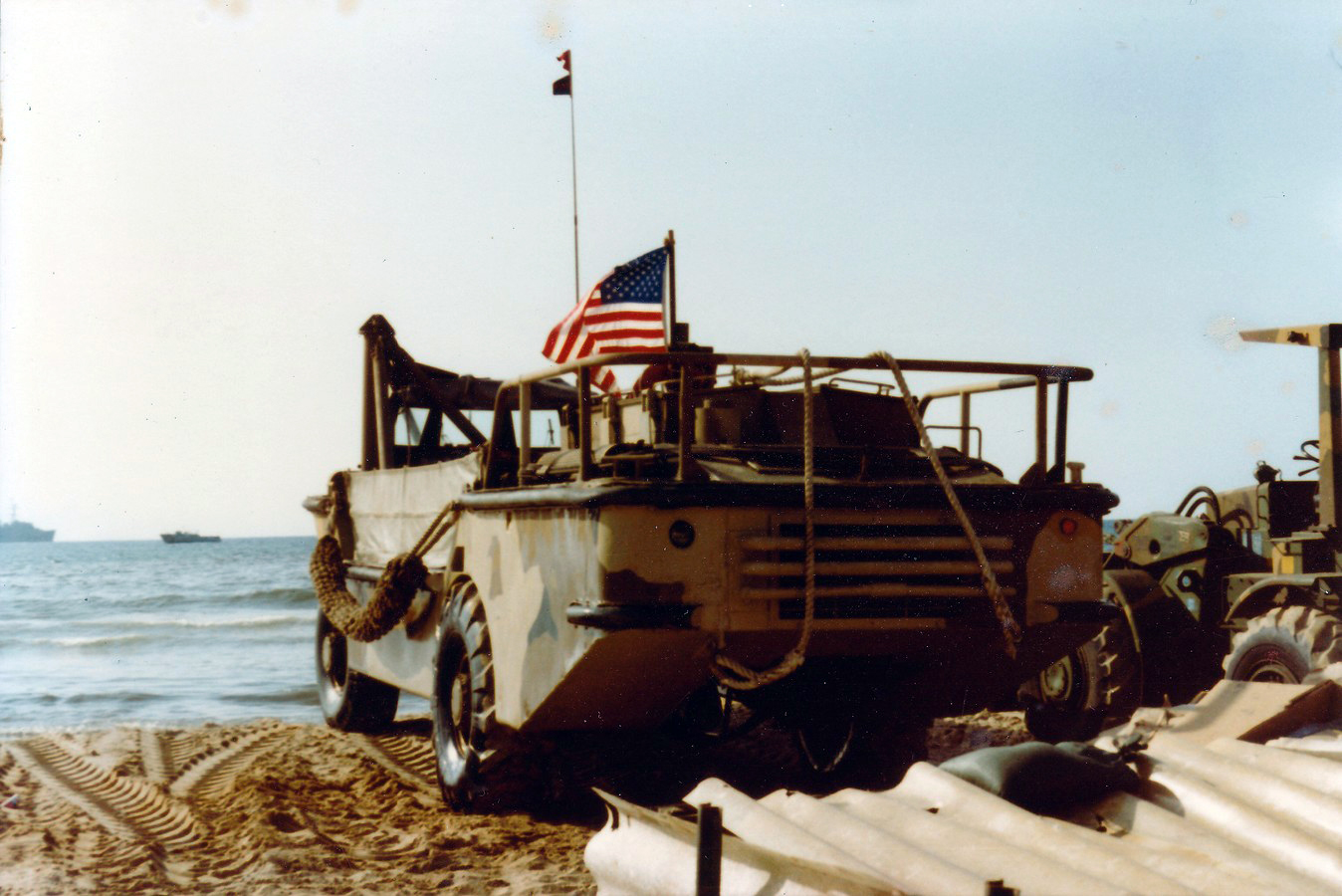
U.S. Navy Amphibian arriving in Beirut, 1982

The French Armed Forces landed in Beirut on August 21, with the U.S. Marines 2nd Battalion, 8th Marines arriving on August 25 and the Italian Armed Forces 2nd Bersaglieri Battalion "Governolo" on August 26. This initial force consisted of 850 U.S., 860 French, and 575 Italian troops and was tasked with securing Beirut's port through which the PLO would be evacuated by ship. The next morning, the first ship arrived in port to begin evacuating PLO and Syrian forces. By the end of the day, 1,066 PLO fighters had been allowed to pass through the Marine lines and reach the ship. Elsewhere in Beirut, the Italian and French were also facilitating the departure of the PLO and Syrians.

Over the course of the next 15 days, the evacuation went smoothly as the PLO streamed through the port facilities. The culminating event was the departure of PLO chairman, Yasser Arafat, on Aug. 30. Escorted by French forces, Arafat's arrival at the port caused a huge crowd of well-wishers and media to congregate, Arafat was aboard the Tunis-bound merchant ship Atlantis. Consequently, the Multinational Force troop contingent reboarded to their respective ships in the Mediterranean Sea on September 9, after 15 days ashore in Beirut.

=== Operation DIODON: Lebanon 1982–1984 ===
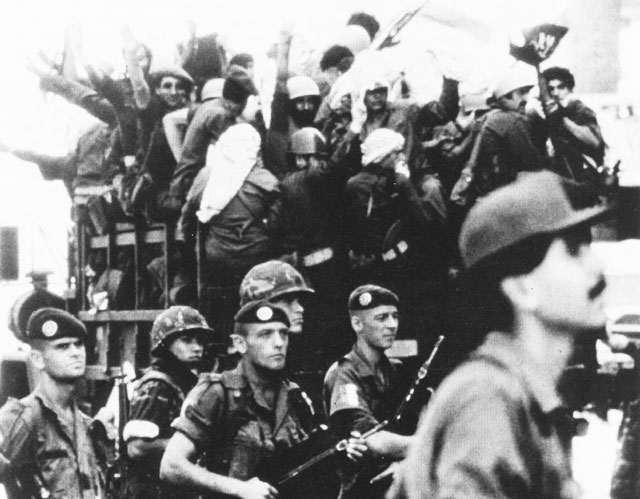
U.S. Marines of the 32d Marine Amphibious Unit and legionnaires of the 2nd Foreign Parachute Regiment form a joint security guard during the evacuation of the PLO from Beirut, Lebanon.

On August 19, 1982; the 2nd Foreign Parachute Regiment succeeded following a request from the Lebanese Government to allow the departure of the Palestinian contingent from Beirut. Following the events of Sabra and Chatila; international consciences decided to put in motion a reinforced security force. Subsequently, the regiments and units of the French Armed Forces and French paratroopers relayed each other at Beirut to fulfill a mission of mediation and preservation of peace. Operating within the contingent of the multinational force at Beirut which counted already U.S. troops based at the airport; Italian troops in southern Beirut, and British troops implanted near the tobacco manufacturing facility; the 31st Brigade (France) reinforced by the 1st Foreign Cavalry Regiment and a detachment of the 17th Parachute Engineer Regiment assures security and confidence of trust in the greater Lebanon and Beirut.

On May 19, 1983; the first elements of the 2nd Foreign Infantry Regiment disembarked within the cadre of the operation. On September 26, 1983; the last participating contingents forming Operation DIODON leave Lebanon. France suffered one casualty, Caporal-Chef Vuillermet who died of his wounds.

=== Italcon mission 1982–1984 ===
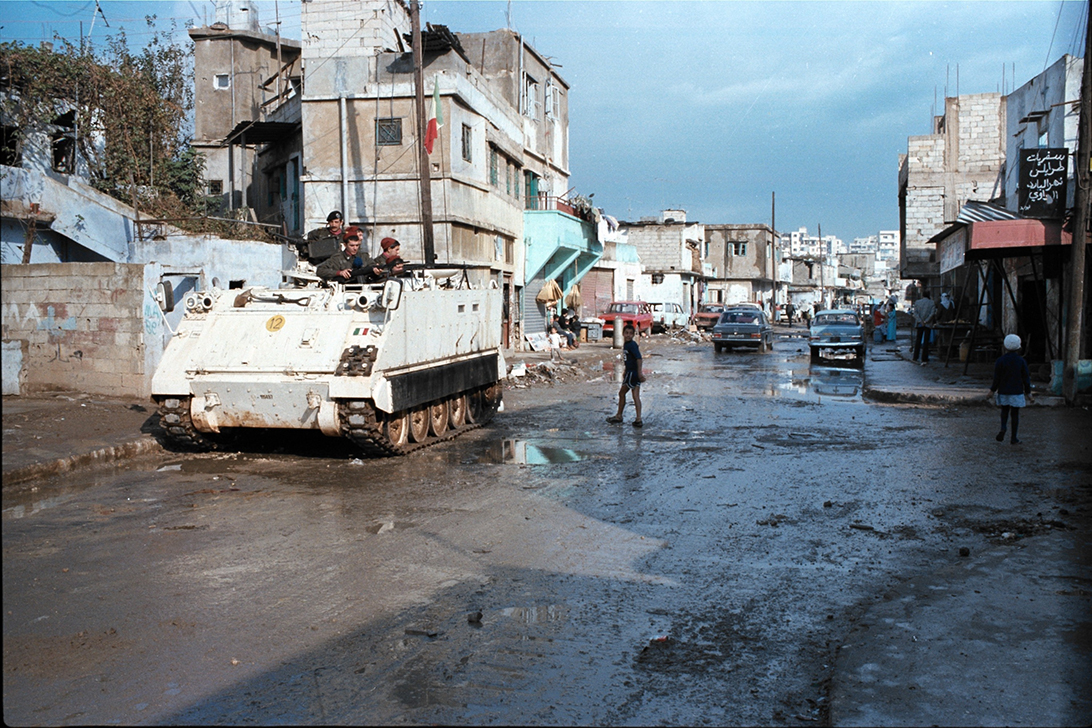
Italian troops of the 2nd Bersaglieri Battalion "Governolo" on patrol with the Multinational Force in Lebanon in 1982

The 2,300-strong Italian Contingent (Italcon) landed in Beirut on September 24; it was made up of paratroopers from the Paratroopers Brigade "Folgore", troops drawn from the Bersaglieri battalions, Marines of the San Marco Regiment, and the army's medical corp with a field hospital. The Italian area of responsibility was south of the city, near the refugee camps of Sabra, Shatila, and Burj al Barahinah. Italcon was commanded by Gen. Franco Angioni.

=== British Forces Lebanon (BRITFORLEB) 1982–1984 ===
The involvement of British forces in the Multinational Force was agreed by the UK Government on December 15, 1982. The American request for UK military support posed a dilemma for Prime Minister Margaret Thatcher who was wary of entanglement in the complex conflict in Lebanon. However, she agreed to a small, limited commitment as a token effort to support the UK–US 'special relationship'. The contingent of BRITFORLEB, codenamed Operation Hyperion, was limited to an armoured reconnaissance squadron equipped with Ferret armoured cars with, at most, 115 deployed personnel. British Forces were based in the East Beirut district of Regie Hadath. The contingent did not suffer any fatalities and was withdrawn, with the other multinational contingents, in February 1984. BRITFORLEB consisted of three squadron-sized rotations from armoured reconnaissance units: C Sqn (Feb–Aug 1983) and A Sqn (Aug–Dec 1983) from the 1st Queens Dragoon Guards, and A Sqn (Dec 1983 – Feb 1984) of the 16th/5th The Queen's Royal Lancers.

== Beirut II ==
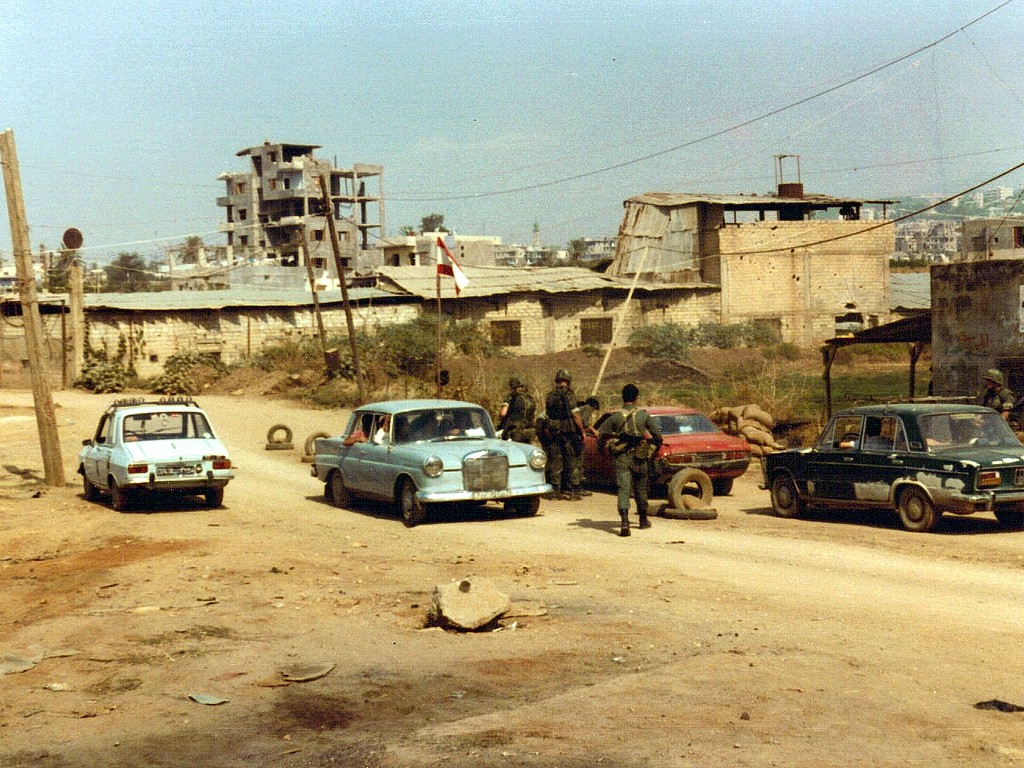
Checkpoint 4, guarded by U.S. Marines and Lebanese soldiers in the outskirts of Beirut in 1982

In the aftermath of President-elect Gemayel's assassination on September 14, the IDF entered West Beirut, citing a need to prevent civil disorder. While in Beirut Israeli troops allowed the Phalangist-affiliated Lebanese Forces (LF) to enter Sabra and Shatila to root out PLO cells believed located there, hundreds of Palestinian refugees were killed in the process. This incident prompted U.S. President Ronald Reagan to organize a new Multinational Force (MNF) with France and Italy. On September 29, this new force entered Beirut, with about 1,200 troops. Their stated mission was to help the new Lebanese government and army with stability.
Lebanon's military predicament began during the last week of June 1982, when the Maronite-dominated Lebanese Forces (LF) militia began to move steadily up the Beirut-Damascus highway toward Alayh, where it engaged militia elements of the Druze Progressive Socialist Party (PSP). The LF, in an effort to establish its presence in new areas, moved into Saida and the western fringes of the Shuf by the end of the month. It was in the Shuf, under the watchful eyes of the IDF, that the LF and PSP maneuvered toward an inevitable confrontation. The significance of the LF advance is that it rekindled the Lebanese civil war.
The second deployment consisted of the 2nd Battalion 8th Marine Regiment and U.S. Army Soldiers. They were followed by the 3rd Battalion 8th Marines in October 1982. The Battalion Landing Team's headquarters was at Beirut International Airport. France's contingent of 1,500 paratroopers were based in the coastal part of West Beirut close to the seaport, and the 1,400 Italian troops (paratroopers of the Folgore Brigade, Bersaglieri regiments and the San Marco Regiment) were based in the southern part of the city, where refugees are concentrated. In February 1983, United Kingdom armoured cars from 1st The Queen's Dragoon Guards joined the MNF.

== Beirut III ==
On November 3, 1982, the 24th MAU replaced the 32d MAU. By November 15, a DoD team had completed a survey of Lebanese Armed Forces (LAF) capabilities and requirements. Marine Mobile Training Teams (MTT) from the USMNF began conducting individual and small unit training for the LAF at BIA. Training of a LAF rapid-reaction force by the USMNF began during the week of December 21. The last significant event of 1982 was the beginning of negotiations between Lebanon and Israel on December 28 calling for Israeli withdrawal from Lebanon. During the winter of 1982–1983, the MNF was successful in its mission. Though officially neutral, the force was responsible for preventing attacks from various Lebanese factions and the Israeli Army. The MNF increasingly came under fire from factions of the Lebanese Civil War. Foot and vehicle patrols were conducted routinely throughout Beirut in an effort to gather information and provide a visible presence demonstrating multinational force commitment to the people of Lebanon.

== Beirut IV ==
On February 15, 1983, the 2nd Battalion, 6th Marines relieved the 3rd Battalion, 8th Marines in the U.S. sector. When harsh winter weather with low temperatures, high winds, and deep snows threatened Lebanese villages high in the mountains northeast of Beirut, the Marines were asked by the Lebanese Government on February 21 to provide a relief column to rescue Lebanese civilians stranded in Qatarba. The rescue mission was conducted February 22–24. Lt. Col. Don Anderson, the commander of Battalion Landing Team 2/6 led a column of nine thirty-ton amphibious tractors (AmTracs) and several wheeled vehicles across rugged mountain terrain, reaching Qatarba 16 hours after leaving the Beirut International Airport. The AmTracs created a landing zone by packing down deep snows so that additional food and heating fuel could be delivered to the village by helicopters. Civilian casualties who could not be treated on-scene by the battalion medical team were airlifted out, while those needing less serious medical attention were evacuated to Beirut by AmTrac on February 24, 1983.

On April 18, 1983, the U.S. embassy in West Beirut was bombed, killing 63 people. A suicide terrorist driving a van packed with 2,000 pounds of highly explosive pentaerythritol tetranitrate (PETN) crashed into the embassy lobby detonating the payload. This attack was a clear sign of opposition to MNF presence. The embassy was located in the French sector, and French Marines immediately responded to provide security and begin rescue operations. The French commander, Brig. Gen. Michel Datin placed his responding forces under the operational control of Col. James Mead, the MAU Commander. Lt. Col. Don Anderson provided a reinforced rifle company (Company F) to take over security the embassy compound to enable rescue and recovery operations. Once recovery operations were concluded, a heavily reinforced rifle platoon from Company G was stationed at the embassy through the end of May 1983, when 2nd Battalion, 6th Marines was relieved by 1st Battalion, 8th Marines.

In April–May 1983 shuttle diplomacy on the part of U.S. State Secretary George P. Shultz was pivotal in finalizing the agreement between Israel and Lebanon, commonly known as the 'May 15 agreement,' which called for bilateral termination of the ongoing state of war between the two countries. The agreement was signed concurrently in Kiryat Shmona, Israel and Khaldeh, Lebanon on May 15, 1983. In the summer of 1983, U.S. Marines at the airport were repeatedly shelled by members of Shia Amal and Druze militias. Several marines were killed and others wounded. In response, the U.S. warships USS Bowen, USS Pharris, USS Virginia, USS John Rodgers, USS Moosbrugger and USS Arthur W. Radford shelled Amal and Druze positions near Beirut.

== Beirut V ==
On May 30, 1983, the 24th MAU relieved the 22d MAU. On June 25, USMNF personnel conducted combined patrols with the LAF for the first time. On July 14, a LAF patrol was ambushed by Druze militia elements, and from July 15 to 17, the LAF engaged the Shia Amal militia in Beirut over dispute involving the eviction of Shiite squatters from a schoolhouse. At the same time, fighting in the Shuf between the LAF and Druze militia escalated sharply. On July 22, Beirut International Airport was shelled with Druze mortar and artillery fire, wounding three U.S. Marines and causing the temporary closing of the airport.
On July 23, Walid Jamblatt, leader of the predominantly Druze Progressive Socialist Party (PSP), announced the formation of a Syrian-backed "National Salvation Front" opposed to the May 17 Israel-Lebanon Agreement. In anticipation of an IDF withdrawal from the Alayh and Shuf districts, fighting between the Druze and LF, and between the Druze and LAF, intensified during the month of August. Druze artillery closed the BIA between and August 10 and 16, and the Druze made explicit their opposition to LAF deployment in the Shuf. The LAF also clashed with the Amal militia in Beirut's western and southern suburbs.
As the security situation deteriorated, USMNF positions at BIA were subjected to increased fire. On August 10 and 11, an estimated thirty-five rounds of mortar and rocket fire landed on USMNF positions, wounding one Marine. On August 28, 1983, the USMNF returned fire for the first time. On the following day, USMNF artillery silenced a Druze battery after two Marines had been killed in a mortar attack. On August 31, the LAF swept through the Shia neighborhood of West Beirut, establishing temporary control over the area.
On September 4, Beirut International Airport was again shelled, killing two Marines and wounding two others. As the LAF moved slowly eastward into the foothills of the Shuf, accounts of massacres, conducted by Christians and Druze alike, began to be reported. On September 5, a Druze force, reportedly reinforced by PLO elements, routed the Christian LF militia at Bhamdun and all but eliminated the LF as a military factor in the Alayh District. This defeat obliged the LAF to occupy Suq-Al-Gharb to avoid conceding all of the high ground overlooking Beirut International Airport to the Druze. USMNF positions were subjected to constant indirect fire attacks; consequently, counter-battery fire based on target acquisition radar data was employed. F-14 tactical airborne reconnaissance missions were conducted for the first time on September 7. On September 8, naval gunfire from offshore destroyers was employed for the first time in defense of the USMNF.
The National Security Council determined that the successful defense of Suq-Al-Gharb was essential to the safety of the USMNF. On September 14, an emergency ammunition resupply to the LAF was instituted. On September 19, Navy destroyers provided gunfire support of the LAF defenders at Suq-Al-Gharb. The battleship USS New Jersey arrived in Lebanese waters on September 25. A ceasefire was instituted that same day and Beirut International Airport reopened five days later. On October 1, 1983, Walid Jumblatt announced a separate governmental administration for the Shuf and called for the mass defection of all Druze elements from the LAF. Nevertheless, on October 14 the leaders of Lebanon's key factions agreed to conduct reconciliation talks in Geneva, Switzerland.
By the end of September 1983, the situation in Lebanon had changed to the extent that not one of the initial conditions upon which the mission statement was premised was still valid. The environment clearly was hostile. The assurances the Government of Lebanon had obtained from the various factions were obviously no longer operative as attacks on the USMNF came primarily from extralegal militias, and the environment could no longer be characterized as peaceful.
The image of the USMNF, in the eyes of the factional militias, had become pro-Israel, pro-Phalange, and anti-Muslim. After the USMNF engaged in direct fire support of the LAF at Suq-Al-Gharb, a significant portion of the Lebanese populace no longer considered the MNF a neutral force.

== Barracks bombing ==
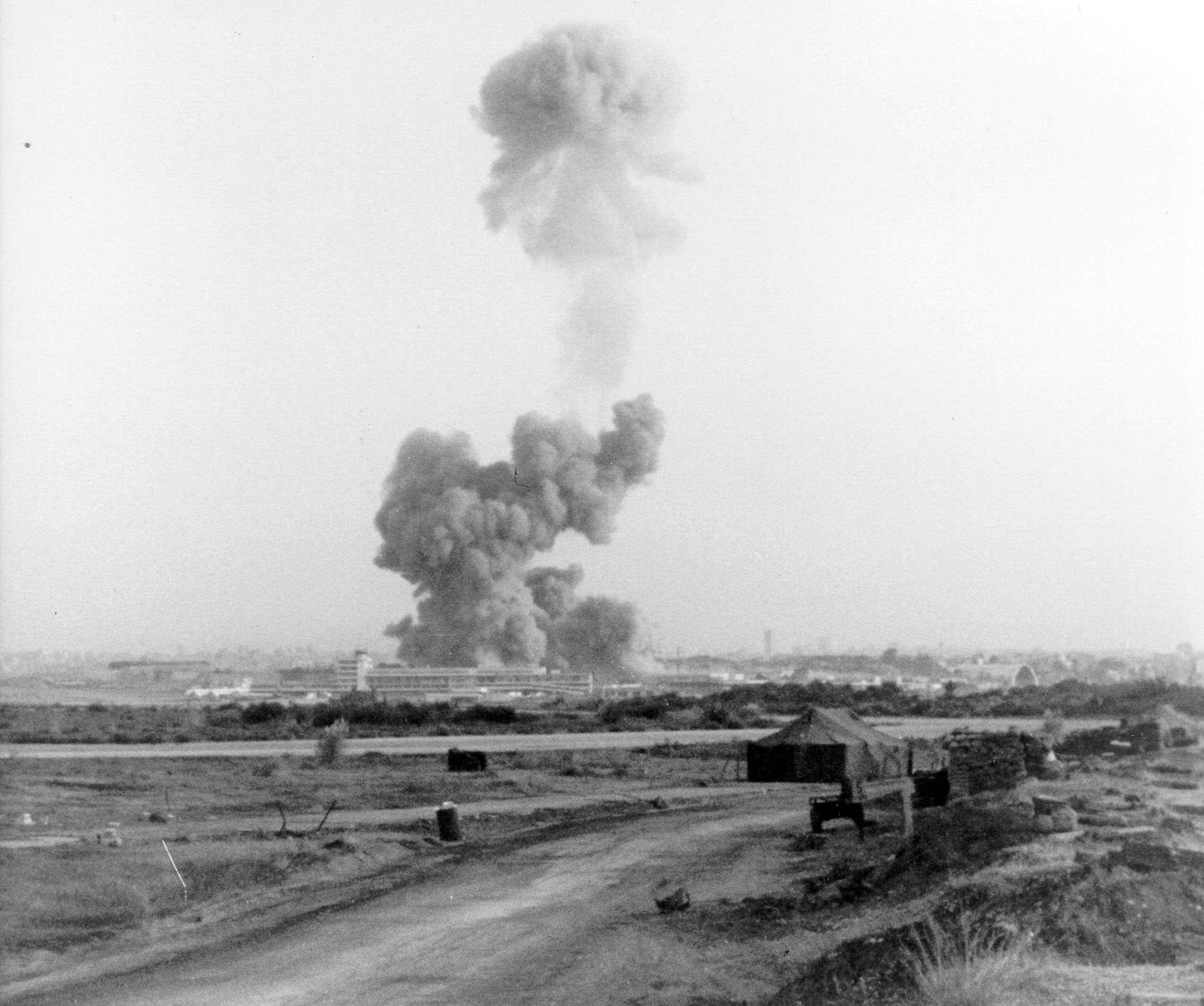
A mushroom cloud visible from 500 meters after the blast

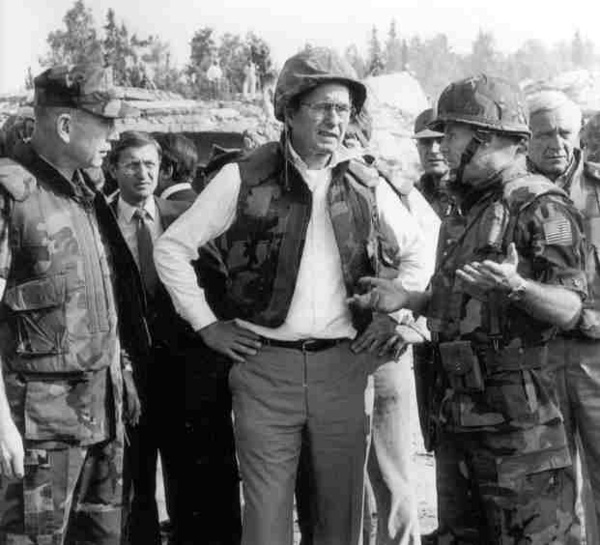
Marine Gen. P.X. Kelley (left) and Col. Tim Geraghty (right) take Vice President George H. W. Bush on a tour around the site of the Beirut barracks bombing two days after the explosion.

The MNF suffered its greatest number of casualties on October 23, when Shia suicide bombers driving two truck bombs loaded with the equivalent of six tons of TNT plowed into the U.S. and French barracks in two simultaneous attacks, killing 241 U.S. servicemen and 58 French paratroopers. The force of the explosion ripped the barracks compound building from its foundation, the building then imploded upon itself. FBI Forensic Laboratory personnel investigating the scene of the attack described the blast as the largest non-nuclear explosion they've witnessed. The FBI also concluded that, even if the truck had not reached the building, and had exploded instead on the roadway at a distance of 330 feet (100 m) from the building, nearly the same amount of damage and a significant number of casualties still would have resulted. On October 26 as Vice President Bush visited Beirut, Company B positions took 15 mortar rounds over a two-hour period. They returned the fire with 21 rounds of high-explosive 81 mm ammunition. Before the month was over, the MAU would suffer three more wounded, none of whom needed to be evacuated. A large congressional delegation arrived on October 29 and was briefed and given a tour of the MAU positions. Other high-level visitors toured the scene at the end of October and the beginning of November. With this incident, the public began to question the wisdom of having the MNF in Lebanon and calls to withdraw from Lebanon grew louder. Nevertheless, President Reagan reasserted his commitment to seeing his foreign policy goals out in Lebanon.

Advance party from the 22d MAU arrived at Beirut on November 17. General Joy and his staff boarded the USS Guam, where he relieved Colonel Faulkner as 22d MAU commander at approximately 11:00. In early November, before he took over command of the MAU, General Joy was in Beirut to survey the situation. He was directed a number of actions to enhance the security of the U.S. Multi-National Forces ashore in Lebanon. Among these was a requirement to reduce the size of the BLT and MAU headquarters ashore to an essential few, with the "non-essential" Marines relocated on board Phibron shipping.

== Beirut VI ==
Elements of BLT 2/8, fresh and eager after a successful operation in Grenada, began landing at Beirut International Airport on November 17. At that time, BLT 1/8 began to backload on Phibron 8 shipping. By 23:30 the next day, all members of the 24th MAU were re-embarked and ready to leave for home. Brigadier General Jim R. Joy, the 22d MAU commander, relieved Colonel Geraghty as commander of the U.S. contingent of the Multi-National Force, Beirut at 1000 on November 19, for the 22d MAU's third deployment to Lebanon, BLT 2/8 had the Marine infantry battalion reduced by 10 percent, to a strength of 43 officers and 779 enlisted Marines. Despite this reduction, the new battalions were given greater fire power. General Joy then threw the MAU's entire efforts into improving the safety and security of all troops ashore by constructing additional bunkers, improving existing positions, ensuring dispersion of units, and "fine-tuning the command and control capability of the MAU HQ." The fact that the turnover had gone so smoothly, in perfect weather, and without harassing fire from unfriendly elements, enabled the MAU to push ahead with its barrier and obstacle plan and to begin building a new MAU command post on November 19.

A Seabee site survey team had been at the airport for two days, November 17–19, to review the Marine positions and determine how they could be improved and made safer. Meanwhile, the MAU headquarters had been moved to the airport maintenance building just east of its previous site. The new BLT command post was now on a piece of land between the coastal highway and the southern end of the airport's north–south runway. Northeast–southwest runways, were the artillery battery emplacements. Two rifle companies (F and G) were dispersed on the eastern side of the northeast–southwest runway within several hundred yards of LAF and Shia positions near Khaldeh, were the Marines were still subject to frequent sniper fire. Less than a week after November 23, General Joy again reported that he, his staff, and his commanders had dedicated their efforts to continuing the "presence" mission while doing their utmost to prevent a recurrence of the bombing and other terrorist actions. At the same time, he recognized that the terrorists might resort to such other tactics as mining the MAU area, and ambushing, kidnapping, or assassinating Marines. The MAU commander further reported that he had identified the Durrafourd Building, the U.S./U.K. Embassy, and the MAU/MSSG areas as the most likely terrorist targets, and that he had taken the steps he mentioned earlier to protect the Marines against terrorist attacks.

== Subsequent confrontations and withdrawal ==
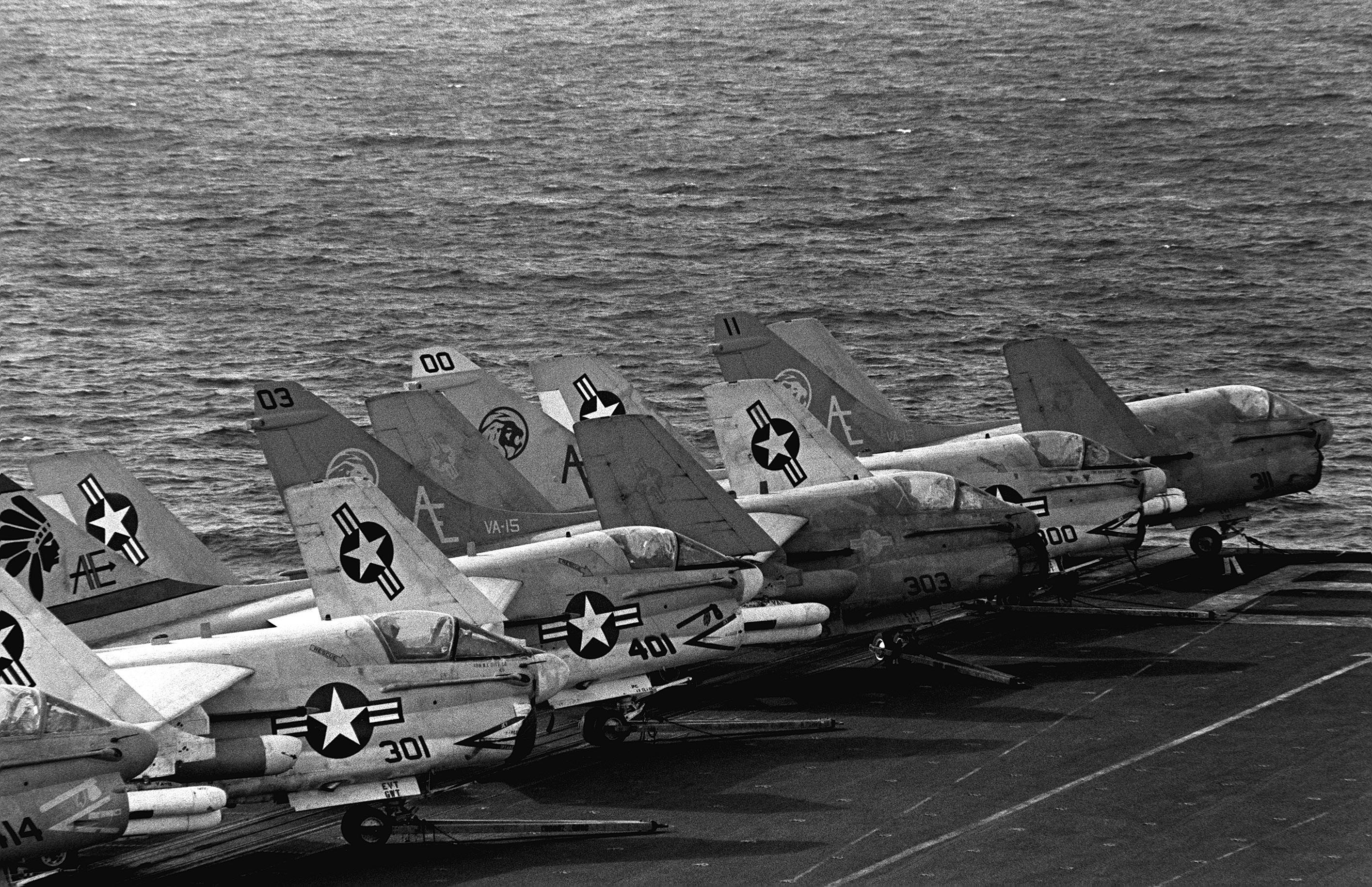
Vought A-7E Corsair II aircraft of attack squadrons VA-15 Valions and VA-87 Golden Warriors of Carrier Air Wing Six (CVW-6) line the flight deck of the aircraft carrier USS Independence (CV-62) in December 1983.

French Navy warplanes retaliated in November to the bombings by striking Iranian Revolutionary Guard's barracks in Baalbek, in the Bekaa Valley, though it did minor damage. At this time, tensions rose between Syria and the United States as Syrian anti-aircraft batteries fired on U.S. aircraft as they patrolled Lebanese airspace. This culminated in the first direct U.S. military involvement in Lebanon on December 4. After being fired upon by Syrian missiles, U.S. aircraft targeted Syrian missile batteries in the mountains east of Beirut. In the process, Syrian 9K31 Strela-1 or man-portable Strela 2 surface-to-air missiles shot down two American planes, an A-6 Intruder and an A-7 Corsair. The pilot of the A-6, LT Mark Lange (flying from USS John F. Kennedy), was killed; his Bombardier/Navigator, LT Bobby Goodman, ejected and was captured by Syrian soldiers. Lt. Goodman was held for 30 days before his release was facilitated by Jesse Jackson. Lt. Lange's body was returned. From the A-7, the pilot, who was the commander of Carrier Air Wing Six, ejected and was rescued, although he suffered severe injuries.

On the same day, eight U.S. Marines were killed when Syrian-backed militias shelled the airport observation post.

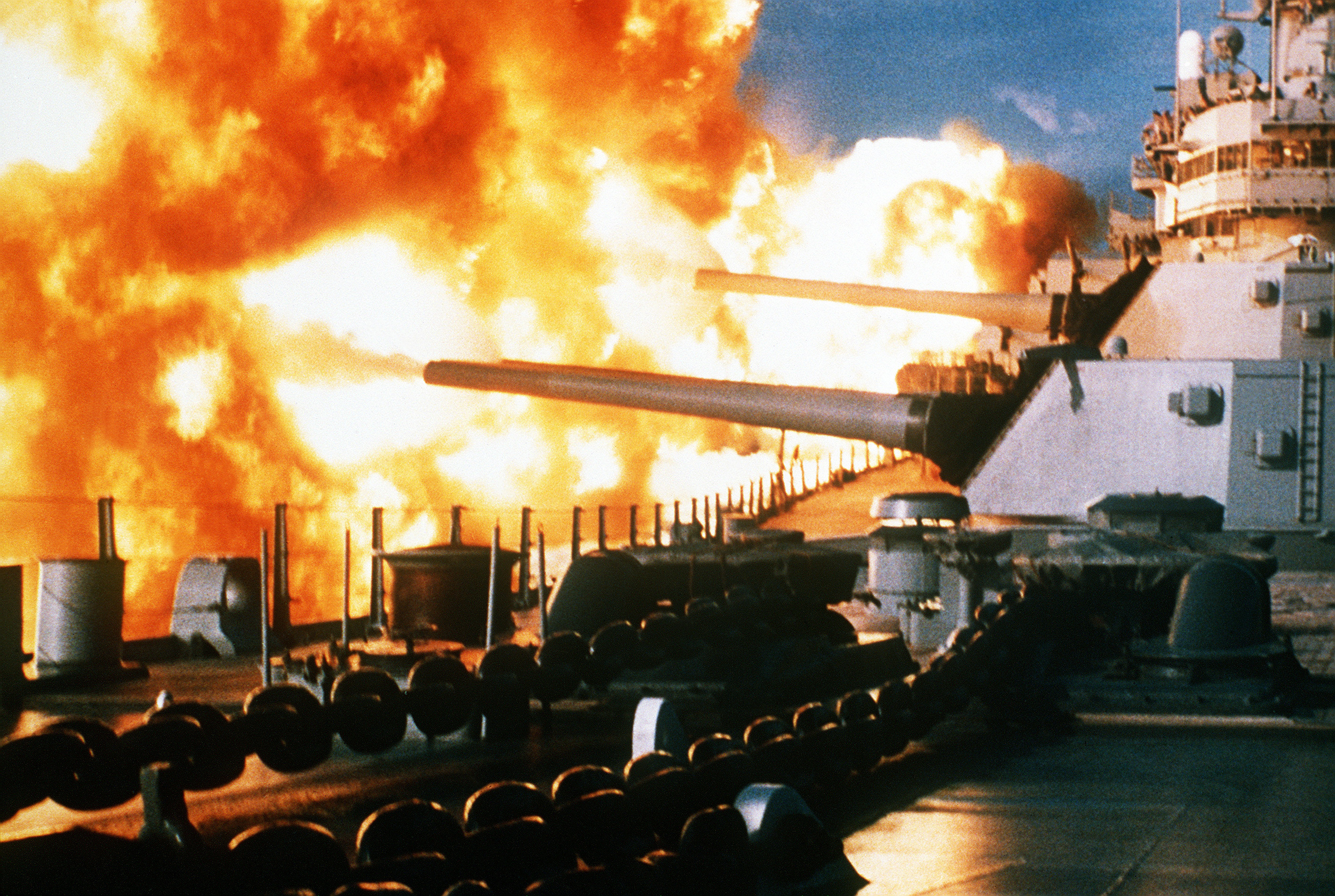
USS New Jersey fires a salvo from her 16 inch guns during a 1984 deployment off the coast of Beirut.

In response to more fire, the battleship USS New Jersey fired on Lebanon on December 14 and 15. Meanwhile, Yasser Arafat and his PLO left Tripoli on December 20 on five Greek ships bound for Tunisia. The MNF was targeted again by bombs on December 21, with a truck bomb killing a French soldier and 14 Lebanese outside a French military base, and a bomb killing four at a Western-owned bar.

The captured U.S. crewman, Lt. Bobby Goodman, was released on January 3, 1984, after negotiations with Reverend Jesse Jackson. At the same time, U.S. President Ronald Reagan was pressured for a troop withdrawal from Lebanon by Congress. These calls were increased after the Lebanese PM and his cabinet resigned February 5. Shiite and Druze militiamen began fighting outside Beirut on February 6 and threw the capital into chaos. Reagan ordered the 1,700 Marines to begin withdrawing on February 7. The following day, February 8, the USS New Jersey was again called upon to fire its main battery, this time against Syrian and Druze positions in the Bekaa Valley. During this Naval Gunfire Support (NGFS) mission, the "Big J" fired 288 rounds of its 16" projectiles. Thirty rounds hit a Syrian command post, killing the general commanding Syrian forces in Lebanon, and several of his senior officers.

The British were the first to withdraw, evacuating their forces by air with American assistance on January 2 after having a parade at their compound headquarters during which the portrait of Queen Elizabeth II was removed. The Italians pulled out next on February 20; the Marines followed on February 26. However, a contingient of Marines from BLT 3/8, the ground combat element of the 24th Marine Amphibious Unit, remained in Beirut and provide the External Security Force at the U.S. Embassy until their withdrawal on July 31. The last French troops left on March 31.

According to a 2019 study, the collapse of the Lebanese national army in February 1984 was the primary motivating factor behind the withdrawal of U.S. forces from Lebanon.

== Casualties ==
=== United States ===
The United States lost 265 servicemen in Lebanon, all but nine in hostile incidents, 241 were killed in the barracks bombing. 159 were wounded.

=== France ===
France lost more than 89 soldiers out of which 58 French Paratroopers in the barracks bombing and many other soldiers from French regular and Foreign Legion regiments, mainly conducting combat operations, demining and training the Lebanese Armed Forces along with the 17th Parachute Engineer Regiment.

=== Italy ===
The Italians lost two soldiers, both to hostile actions.

== See also ==
- 1958 Lebanon crisis
- Hezbollah
- Lebanese Civil War
- United Nations Interim Force in Lebanon (UNIFIL)
- List of extrajudicial killings and political violence in Lebanon

== Bibliography ==
- Frédéric Pons, Les Paras sacrifiés, Beyrouth, 1983–1984 (The Sacrificed Paras, Beyrouth, 1983–1984), Presses de la Cité, Paris 1994.
- "Report of the DOD Commission on Beirut International Airport Terrorist Act, October 23, 1983" (PDF). Federation of American Scientists. December 20, 1983.
- Frank, Benis M. (1987). "U.S. Marines in Lebanon, 1982–1984". History and Museums Division, U.S. Marine Corps.
