= Stafford, California =

Stafford, California may refer to:

- Stafford, Humboldt County, California
- Stafford, Sutter County, California, historic name of a hamlet now superseded by Live Oak, Sutter County, California
