= Edward Stafford =

Edward Stafford may refer to:

== People ==
- Edward Stafford, 2nd Earl of Wiltshire (1470–1498)
- Edward Stafford, 3rd Duke of Buckingham (1478–1521), executed for treason
- Edward Stafford, 3rd Baron Stafford (1535–1603)
- Sir Edward Stafford (diplomat) (1552–1605), English ambassador to Paris and MP
- Edward Stafford, 4th Baron Stafford (1572–1625)
- Sir Edward Stafford (politician) (1819–1901), Premier of New Zealand
- Ed Stafford (born 1975), British explorer
- Edward Stephen Stafford, editor of The Johns Hopkins Medical Journal

== Fictional characters ==
- Edward Stafford (The Tudors), a fictionalized version of the 3rd Duke of Buckingham, on the TV show "The Tudors"

== See also ==
- Stafford (surname)
