= William O. Howard =

American politician

Member of the U.S. House of Representatives from Missouri's 49th district

Missouri House of Representatives
- Incumbent
- Assumed office 1973

Personal details
- Born: 1923 Elsberry, Missouri
- Died: 2006 (aged 82–83) Lincoln County, Missouri
- Party: Democratic
- Spouse: Jane Willis Hunter
- Children: 2 sons
- Occupation: farmer

William O. "Bob" Howard (April 3, 1923 – November 13, 2006) was a Democratic politician who served in the Missouri House of Representatives. He was born in Elsberry, Missouri, and was educated at Elsberry High School and University of Missouri in Columbia, Missouri. In 1948, he married Jane Willis Hunter at Clarksville, Missouri. Howard in 2006 at the Elsberry Healthcare Center near Elsberry, Missouri.
