= Justice Stafford =

Justice Stafford or Judge Stafford or variation, may refer to:

- Charles F. Stafford (1918–1984), associate justice of the Washington Supreme Court
- Wendell Phillips Stafford (1861–1953), associate justice of the Vermont Supreme Court
- William Henry Stafford Jr. (1931–2025), senior judge of the United States District Court for the Northern District of Florida

== See also ==
- Sidney Stafford Smythe (1705–1778), British judge and politician
- Stafford (surname)
