= Stafford (disambiguation) =

Stafford is the county town of Staffordshire, England.

Stafford may also refer to:

== Places ==
=== Other places in England ===
- Stafford, Dolton, Devon
- Stafford (UK Parliament constituency)
- Stafford Castle
- Borough of Stafford, a district of Staffordshire
- County of Stafford, another name for Staffordshire
- West Stafford, in Dorset

=== United States ===
- Stafford, California (disambiguation)
  - Stafford, Humboldt County, California
  - Stafford, Sutter County, California, historic name of a hamlet now superseded by Live Oak, Sutter County, California
- Stafford, Connecticut
- Stafford, Kansas
- Stafford, Nebraska
- Stafford Township, New Jersey
- Stafford, New York
- Stafford, Ohio
- Stafford, Oregon
- Stafford, Texas
- Stafford, Virginia
- Stafford County, Virginia

=== Australia ===
- Stafford, Queensland, a suburb of Brisbane
- Electoral district of Stafford, Queensland

=== South Africa ===
- Stafford, Gauteng, a suburb of Johannesburg

== People ==
=== Surname ===
- Stafford (surname)

=== Given name ===
- Anthony Stafford Beer (1926-2002), British theorist, consultant and professor at the Manchester Business School
- Stafford Cripps (1889–1952), British politician
- Stafford Huyler, cartoonist who created the webcomic NetBoy
- Stafford Repp (1918–1974), American character actor
- Stafford Fairborne (1666–1742), British politician
- John Stafford Smith (1750–1836), British composer, church organist, and musicologist

== Other ==
- Stafford (1769 EIC ship), an East India Company ship
- The Stafford London, a boutique hotel in St. James's, London, England
- Stafford Disaster Relief and Emergency Assistance Act
- Stafford Farm, a farm in Voorhees, New Jersey
- Stafford Loan, a type of loan offered to American students demonstrating financial need
- Stafford Plantation, Cumberland Island, Georgia, US
- Stafford, a character from Thomas & Friends
- Stafford, a clothing line from J. C. Penney
- Stafford, short for Staffordshire Bull Terrier
- Stafford Gambit in chess
- 1990 Stafford rail crash, England (inattentive driver)
- 1996 Stafford rail crash at Rickerscote, England (axle failure)

== See also ==
- Staffort, in Germany
- Strafford (disambiguation)
- Stratford (disambiguation)
- Justice Stafford (disambiguation)
