= Jack Stafford (umpire) =

Canadian baseball umpire (1879–1946)

- Born: John E. Stafford; 1879; Portland, New Brunswick, Canada
- Died: May 19, 1946 (aged 66–67); Worcester, Massachusetts, U.S.
- Resting place: Arlington, Massachusetts
- Occupation: Major League Baseball umpire
- Years active: 1906–1907

John E. Stafford (1879 – May 19, 1946) was a Canadian professional baseball umpire.

Stafford, who was born in Portland, New Brunswick (now Saint John), Canada, in 1879, umpired a single game in the National League in 1906, and then umpired 131 games in the American League in 1907. He issued five ejections during his career, including future Hall of Fame inductee Sam Crawford in May 1907.

Stafford reportedly lost his major league umpiring job following a disagreement with Philadelphia Athletics manager Connie Mack. Stafford was directed to stop umpiring in September 1907 by American League president Ban Johnson, days after umpiring a four-game series between Philadelphia and Boston. Stafford's position was taken by former umpire (and former player) Tom Brown for the remainder of the season.

Stafford later umpired at other levels, including in the Eastern League and International League. Stafford died in Massachusetts in 1946.

== See also ==
- List of Major League Baseball umpires (disambiguation)
