= F. W. Soutter =

Francis William Soutter (23 April 1844 – 9 May 1932) was an English Radical activist.

Soutter was an advocate for independent labour representation in Parliament and campaigned for labour candidates, sometimes in opposition to Liberal candidates. The Free Trade Union employed Soutter as a speaker.
