= Greg Stafford (footballer) =

Australian rules footballer

Personal information
- Born: 27 August 1974 (age 52)
- Original team: Western Suburbs Magpies (Sydney AFL)
- Debut: Round 4, 18 April 1993, Sydney Swans vs. Essendon, at SCG
- Height: 203 cm (6 ft 8 in)
- Weight: 105 kg (231 lb)

Playing career^{1}
Years	Club	Games (Goals)
1993–2001	Sydney Swans	130 (58)
2002–2006	Richmond	74 (83)
Total		204 (141)
- ^{1} Playing statistics correct to the end of 2006.

Gregory Stafford (born 27 August 1974) is an Australian retired professional Australian rules football player who played for the Sydney Swans and the Richmond Football Club in the Australian Football League.

== Playing Record ==
Having grown up in Ashbury, New South Wales, Stafford played senior football with the Western Suburbs Australian Football Club (Magpies) in the Sydney Football League. After a few seasons in his local competition, talent scouts realised the potential of the big ruckman who could also kick goals.

=== AFL career ===
He was recruited by the Sydney Swans from the local Sydney Football League as a rookie outside of the draft. Stafford created much publicity at the time as one of the first Sydneysiders to reach AFL level when he made his first senior appearance with the Swans. Inconsistency and injury eventually saw him traded to the Richmond Football Club, who were looking to strengthen their ruck division. In a career without too many accolades, Stafford has been consistent, tough and hard-working in the ruck for both the Tigers and the Swans. He announced his retirement effective at the end of the 2006 season, before the Round 22 match against West Coast. Stafford booted 3 goals in his farewell game, having played 204 AFL matches. He still ranks as the second most accurate AFL goalkicker since 2002, with 83 goals from 122 shots, at an accuracy of 68% (minimum 50 shots).

Greg played in the 2007 Asian Australian Football Championships for the China Reds.

Greg is now the forward coach at the Melbourne Football Club.

== Stalked by a fan ==
In 2002, in one of the more bizarre moments in AFL history, a crazed fan ran onto the field during a game and attempted to touch Stafford. It was later revealed that the woman had been stalking him for five years and was quoted as saying, "I am not guilty of stalking Greg ... I am guilty of loving Greg."
