= 1875 Kilkenny City by-election =

UK parliamentary by-election

The 1875 Kilkenny City by-election was fought on 28 April 1875. This arose due to the death of the incumbent Home Rule MP, John Gray.

It was contested by three candidates: Gray's son Edmund Dwyer Gray, Edward Marum, and Benjamin Whitworth, former MP for Drogheda. Gray told the electors that his programme did not differ substantially from that of Whitworth: he was in favour of "Home Rule, denominational education, fixity of tenure at fair rents, and reform of the Grand Jury Laws."

Whitworth was elected, with 307 votes; Gray received 125 and Marum 112. The Times saw this as a blow to the Home Rule League - who had condemned Whitworth's programme as vague and inadequate - and anticipated that he would act independently of the Home Ruler movement, although "he will probably be often found acting in harmony with the Home Rule Members".

Kilkenny City by-election, 1875: constituency of Kilkenny City
Party	Candidate	Votes	%	±%
Independent	Benjamin Whitworth	307	56.4	N/A
Home Rule	Edmund Dwyer Gray	125	23.0	N/A
Independent	Edward Marum	112	20.6	N/A
Majority		182	33.4	N/A
Turnout		544	75.7	N/A
Independent gain from Home Rule		Swing		

The reason for the success of Whitworth, who was seen as having the support of the Protestant voters although he was also proposed by the Roman Catholic vicar-general of the diocese, was considered to be the "promises of material aid which he made to Kilkenny". His nomination was seconded by the prominent brewer John Francis Smithwick who would later succeed him as MP for the city.

Marum went on to be elected MP for County Kilkenny and Gray for County Tipperary.
