= Robert Williams (1767–1847) =

English banker and politician, born 1767

Robert Williams (11 February 1767 – 10 March 1847) was an English banker and politician. He purchased the Bridehead estate near Dorchester, Dorset, around 1797. It comprised the manor of Littlebredy, Bridehead being a name fabricated by Williams, and in later years became the main family residence.

He was elected an alderman (1796–1801) and sheriff of London for 1797–8. He was prime warden of the Goldsmiths’ Company in 1810–11, director of the Hope Assurance Company in 1820 and chairman of the company from 1826 to 1841. During the time of the French Revolutionary and Napoleonic Wars, he served as an officer in the Cornhill Volunteers, from Captain in 1797, to Lieutenant Colonel commandant in 1799, and later served in the London and Westminster Light Horse from 1803 to 1807.

Williams was the Member of Parliament (MP) for Wootton Bassett from 1802 to 1807. On 17 March 1808 he was elected MP for Grampound after the previous election had been declared void on 7 March 1808. However he and John Teed were unseated on petition on 10 May 1808 in favour of George Augustus Frederick Cochrane the previous member and William Holmes. Williams was then elected MP for Kilkenny City from 1809 to 1812, and for Dorchester from 1812 to 1835

He married Frances Turner of Putney. His eldest son was politician Robert Williams (1811–1890).

Parliament of the United Kingdom
Preceded by John Denison; Edward Clarke	Member of Parliament for Wootton Bassett; 1802–1807; With: Henry St John to December 1802; Peter William Baker December 1802–1806; Robert Knight from 1806	Succeeded by Sir John Murray; John Cheesment
Preceded by Charles Harward Butler	Member of Parliament for Kilkenny City; 1809–1812	Succeeded by Overington Blunden
Preceded by Andrew Cochrane-Johnstone; George Cochrane	Member of Parliament for Grampound; March 1808 – May 1808; With: John Teed	Succeeded by William Holmes; George Cochrane
Preceded by Robert Williams; Charles Henry Bouverie	Member of Parliament for Dorchester; 1812–1835; With: Charles Henry Bouverie to Dec 1812; William à Court Dec 1812–1814; Samuel Shepherd 1814–1819; Charles Warren 1819–1826; William Ashley-Cooper 1826–1830; Henry Sturt 1830; Lord Ashley 1830–1831; Henry Ashley from 1831	Succeeded by Robert Williams; Henry Ashley
