= Henry Sturt, 1st Baron Alington =

British peer and Conservative Party politician

The Right Honourable The Lord Alington
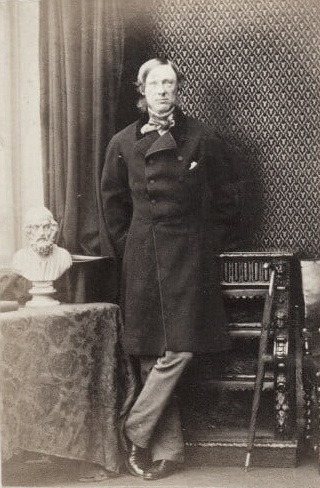
- Henry Sturt, 1860 photograph

Member of Parliament for Dorchester
- In office 1847–1856

Member of Parliament for Dorset
- In office 1856–1876

Member of the House of Lords
- Lord Temporal
- In office 8 January 1876 – 17 February 1904
- Preceded by: Peerage created
- Succeeded by: The 2nd Baron Alington

Personal details
- Born: Henry Gerard Sturt; 16 May 1825
- Died: 17 February 1904 (aged 78)
- Party: Conservative
- Spouses: Augusta Bingham (m. 1853); Evelyn Herietta Leigh (m. 1892)
- Children: Humphrey Sturt, 2nd Baron Alington; Winifred Hardinge, Baroness Hardinge of Penshurst; Mildred, Lady Charles Montagu
- Parent: Henry Sturt (father)
- Occupation: Politician, landowner

Henry Gerard Sturt, 1st Baron Alington (16 May 1825 – 17 February 1904), was a British peer, Conservative Party politician, and notorious slum landlord in the East End of London.

== Early life ==
He was the son of Henry Sturt, a landowner and politician from Dorset, and his wife, Lady Charlotte Brudenell, daughter of Robert Brudenell, 6th Earl of Cardigan. His father purchased the lordship of Motcombe, Dorset, which his family retained into the 20th century. He was educated at Eton College, and matriculated at Christ Church, Oxford, in 1843.

== Political career ==
He was elected to Parliament in 1847 for Dorchester, and re-elected in 1852. In 1856, one of the Conservative MPs for Dorset died. Sturt resigned his Dorchester seat and was elected to the vacant Dorset seat in a by-election. He was re-elected in 1857, 1859, 1865, 1868, and 1874. On 8 January 1876, he was created Baron Alington, of Crichel, and thereafter sat in the House of Lords as a Conservative peer.

== Racing ==
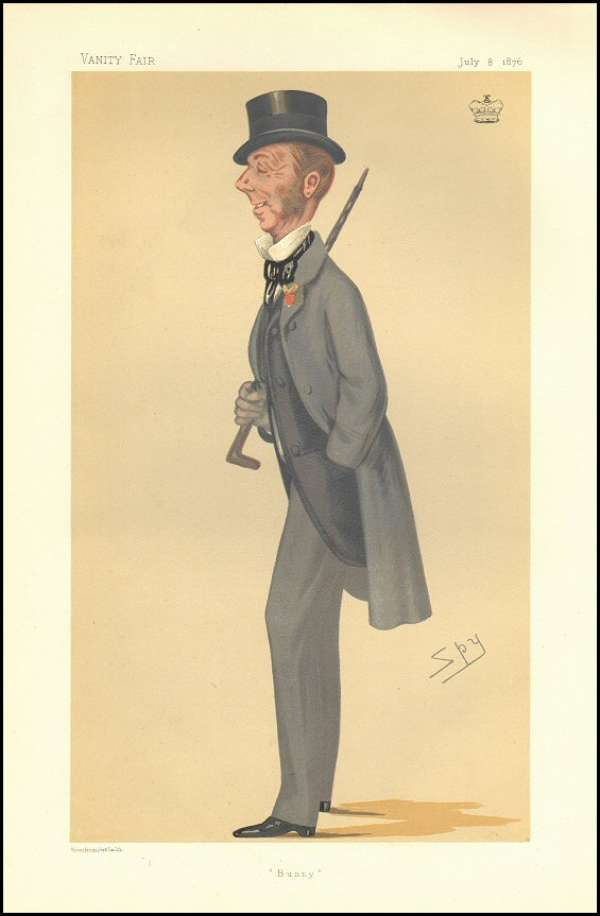
"Bunny". Caricature by "Spy" (Leslie Ward) published in Vanity Fair in 1876

Sturt became a member of the Jockey Club in 1850. In partnership with Sir Frederick Johnstone, 8th Baronet, he was a successful racehorse owner, in particular with Common in 1891.

== Marriages and children ==
Sturt was twice married. On 10 September 1853, he wed his first cousin, Lady Augusta Bingham, daughter of George Bingham, 3rd Earl of Lucan, and Lady Anne Brudenell. They had three children:

- Humphrey Sturt, 2nd Baron Alington (1859–1919), who married Lady Feodorowna Yorke (eldest daughter of Charles Yorke, 5th Earl of Hardwicke), in 1883, and died of wounds.
- Hon. Winifred Sturt (1868–1914), who married Charles Hardinge, 1st Baron Hardinge of Penshurst (second son of Charles Hardinge, 2nd Viscount Hardinge), in 1890.
- Hon. Mildred Sturt (1869–1942), who married three times: to Henry Cadogan, Viscount Chelsea (second son of George Cadogan, 5th Earl Cadogan), in 1892; after his death, to Admiral the Hon. Sir Hedworth Meux (third son of George Lambton, 2nd Earl of Durham) in 1910; and after his death, to Lord Charles Montagu (second son of William Montagu, 7th Duke of Manchester) on 4 December 1930.

On 10 February 1892, Sturt wed Evelyn Henrietta Leigh.

== East End landlord ==
Amongst other holdings, various branches of the family had owned land in London's East End for centuries and the first Lord Alington's son, second Lord Alington "was still in possession of all but a small portion of the combined Pitfield estates in Hoxton when these were submitted to public auction in 1917". Frank Chapple who grew up on Pitfield Street, Hoxton, described it as a "slum village".

Lord Alington was one of the private landlords specifically named in relation to the terrible conditions in the East End in the London Poverty Maps compiled by Charles Booth in the 1890s. "Some private landlords were also criticised. Infant mortality in Shoreditch, one investigator recorded, was 22 per 1000, much higher than the London average. Quoting an anonymous interviewee, he drew attention to the 'disgraceful meanness' of Lord Alington, who owned the whole parish and 'drew £20,000 from the neighbourhood'."

== Notes ==
Parliament of the United Kingdom
Preceded by Henry Ashley; Sir James Graham, Bt	Member of Parliament for Dorchester; 1847–1856; With: George Dawson-Damer 1847–1852; Richard Brinsley Sheridan from 1852	Succeeded by Richard Brinsley Sheridan; Charles Napier Sturt
Preceded by John Floyer; George Bankes; Henry Ker Seymer	Member of Parliament for Dorset; 1856–1876; With: Henry Ker Seymer to 1864; John Floyer to 1857; Henry Portman from 1857	Succeeded by John Floyer; Henry Portman; Edward Digby
Peerage of the United Kingdom
New creation	Baron Alington; 1876–1904; Member of the House of Lords (1876–1904)	Succeeded by Humphrey Sturt
