= 1869 Drogheda by-election =

UK parliamentary by-election

The 1869 Drogheda by-election took place on 15 March 1869. The by-election arose following an election petition which unseated the incumbent MP, the Liberal Benjamin Whitworth.

The petition alleged that the election result was due to intimidation. Witnesses alleged that on the day of nomination, the Drogheda courthouse was 'filled with a mob of the lowest classes, who appeared to be under the influence of whiskey'. There were allegations that a Roman Catholic clergyman was seen at the head of a mob brandishing sticks, and voters had to be escorted by the military for fear of violence in the streets and at the railway station:

'Missiles came in all directions, and the soldiers asked their officers, "Will you let us be murdered?" "Will you not let us protect ourselves?" The mob shouted, "To H[ell] with the Queen", "Down with your Church" and "Up with the Stars and Stripes!"

Religion played a major part in the violence:

'The mob were told that there were 500 Orangemen coming down the next morning. One of the priests told them to give them a warm reception, and hurl them into the Boyne.'

In his decision, Judge Keogh described the town on the day of polling as 'more like a place besieged than one where a free election was going on' and criticised the behaviour and language of the clergy. He decided that intimidation had taken place and that Whitworth and his agent were responsible. He declared the election void, necessitating a by-election.

The by-election was won by Whitworth's son Thomas, who ran as a Liberal and was unopposed. Thomas Whitworth was defeated in the 1874 general election, by the 'Liberal and Home Rule' candidate, William Hagarty O'Leary; on O'Leary's death in 1880, Benjamin Whitworth, by now MP for Kilkenny City, resigned that seat and won Drogheda in the ensuing by-election as a Home Rule candidate.
