= Robert Williams (1811–1890) =

High Sheriff of Dorset
- In office 1855–1855
- Preceded by: Sir Henry Oglander Bt
- Succeeded by: Charles James Radclyffe

Member of Parliament for Dorchester
- In office 1835–1841 Serving with Henry Ashley
- Preceded by: Robert Williams Sr. Henry Ashley
- Succeeded by: Sir James Graham, Bt; Henry Ashley

Personal details
- Born: 23 January 1811
- Died: 7 June 1890 (aged 79) Bridehead, Dorset, England
- Party: Conservative
- Spouses: Mary Anne Cunningham (m. 1847; died 1855) Lady Emily Leslie-Melville (m. 1858)
- Children: 5, including Sir Robert Williams, Bt
- Parent: Robert Williams

Robert Williams (23 January 1811 – 7 June 1890) was a Conservative Party politician in the United Kingdom.

== Early life ==
Williams was born on 23 January 1811. He was the eldest son of the English banker and politician Robert Williams MP and the former Frances Turner of Putney. He later inherited the Bridehead estate near Dorchester, Dorset, which his father had purchased around 1797.

== Career ==
He was elected as Member of Parliament (MP) for Dorchester at the 1835 general election, and held the seat until he stepped down from the House of Commons at the 1841 general election. In 1855 he was appointed Sheriff of Dorset.

== Personal life ==
He had married twice: firstly to Mary Anne Cunningham, the daughter of Rev. John William Cunningham, the Vicar of Harrow, on 7 September 1847. Before her death on 1 September 1855, they had two sons and three daughters, including:

- Sir Robert Williams, 1st Baronet (1848–1943), who married Rosa Walker Simes, daughter of Nathaniel Simes.
- John Arthur Williams (1849–1892).

After the death of his first wife, he married, secondly, Lady Emily Maria Leslie-Melville (1815–1896) on 18 November 1858. Lady Emily was the eldest daughter of John Leslie-Melville, 9th Earl of Leven and Harriet, Countess of Leven (a daughter of Samuel Thornton MP).

Williams died at Bridehead in Dorset in 1890. His widow, Lady Emily Williams, died on 10 March 1896.

=== Descendants ===
Through his son, Sir Robert, he was grandfather of Sir Philip Williams, 2nd Baronet (1884–1958), who married Margaret Peek, daughter of Sir Cuthbert Peek, 2nd Baronet and the former Hon. Augusta Louisa Brodrick (a daughter of William Brodrick, 8th Viscount Midleton).

Parliament of the United Kingdom
Preceded by Robert Williams Sr. Henry Ashley	Member of Parliament for Dorchester; 1835 – 1841; With: Henry Ashley	Succeeded by Sir James Graham, Bt; Henry Ashley
