= 1880 Kilkenny City by-election =

UK Parliamentary by-election

The 1880 Kilkenny City by-election took place on 26 February 1880. It arose due to the resignation of the incumbent Liberal MP, Benjamin Whitworth, in order to contest Drogheda. A Mr. Doherty, from Dublin, went forward as a Home Rule candidate, but withdrew, since he had accepted some government contracts. The only candidate nominated was John Francis Smithwick, who was declared elected unopposed. Smithwick, although described in The Times as a Liberal, was known as a strong supporter of Home Rule. Doherty ran against Smithwick in the general election, less than two months later, as a Home Rule candidate. Smithwick won by 318 votes to 204.
