= John Smithwick =

John Smithwick may refer to:

- John H. Smithwick, U.S. Representative from Florida.
- John Francis Smithwick, Irish businessman and politician
- John Smithwick, founder in 1710 of Smithwick's brewery, Kilkenny, Ireland
