= John Floyer (Dorset MP) =

English cricketer and politician

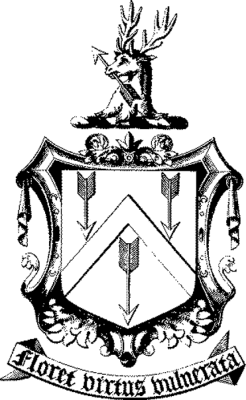
Arms of Floyer of Floyer Hayes in Devon: Sable, a chevron between three arrows points downward argent; crest: A stag's head erased or holding in the mouth an arrow argent. Motto: Floret Virtus Vulnerata ("Virtue flourishes wounded")

John Floyer (26 April 1811 – 4 July 1887) was an English cricketer with amateur status who was active from 1832 to 1833. He was later a Conservative Party politician who sat in the House of Commons in two periods between 1846 and 1885.

== Life ==
He was born in Stinsford, Dorset, the son of Rev. William Floyer and his wife Elizabeth Barton, daughter of Stephen Barton. He was a member of the old Floyer family of Floyer Hayes in Devon descended from Floherus (Flohère), the Exon Domesday Book tenant of that estate, a French knight who in 1086 held two estates in Devon.

Floyer was educated at Winchester College. He matriculated in 1828 at Balliol College, Oxford, graduating B.A. in 1831. He appeared for the University team in one match in 1832. He appeared in 1833 in one other match. He appeared in two matches as an unknown handedness batsman whose bowling style is unknown, playing for Oxford University and for an A to K team organised by Marylebone Cricket Club (MCC). He scored one run with a highest score of 1 and took no wickets.

Folyer was a Deputy Lieutenant and J.P. for Dorset, and was High Sheriff of Dorset in 1844. He was also major of the Queen's Own (Dorset) Yeoman Cavalry.

In 1846 Floyer was elected Member of Parliament for Dorset and held the seat until 1857. He was re-elected for Dorset in 1864 and held the seat until 1885. In that year, the county's three-member seat was subdivided. He died in Westminster.

== Family ==
Floyer married in 1844 Georgina Charlotte Frances Bankes, daughter of George Bankes, MP for Corfe Castle.

== Bibliography ==
- Haygarth, Arthur (1862). Scores & Biographies, Volume 2 (1827–1840). Lillywhite.

Parliament of the United Kingdom
Preceded by Lord Ashley; Henry Sturt; George Bankes	Member of Parliament for Dorset; 1846 – 1857; With: George Bankes to 1856; Henry Ker Seymer 1846–57; Henry Sturt (2) from 1856	Succeeded by Henry Ker Seymer; Henry Sturt (2); Henry Portman
Preceded by Henry Ker Seymer; Henry Sturt (2); Henry Portman	Member of Parliament for Dorset; 1864 – 1885; With: Henry Sturt (2) to 1876; Henry Portman, 2nd Viscount Portman; Edward Digby from 1876	Constituency divided. See North, South, East, and West Dorset
