= 1880 Drogheda by-election =

UK Parliamentary by-election

The 1880 Drogheda by-election was fought on 2 March 1880. The by-election, to the United Kingdom House of Commons, arose through the death of the incumbent Home Rule League Member of Parliament, William Hagarty O'Leary. It was won by Benjamin Whitworth, who had previously sat for the seat as a Liberal but on this occasion announced that he supported the Home Rule cause. He had resigned his current seat, at Kilkenny, in order to run. He received 382 votes as against 181 for J. McCoan, candidate of the Home Rule League. It was reported that 150 Conservative voters had abstained in response to a circular from the party.

Drogheda by-election, 1880
Party	Candidate	Votes	%	±%
Liberal	Benjamin Whitworth	382	67.8	+18.7
Home Rule	Mr. J. McCoan	181	32.1	−18.8
Majority		201	35.7	N/A
Turnout		563	75.8	+3.1
Liberal gain from Home Rule		Swing	+18.8	
