= William Dodd (writer) =

English writer and social activist

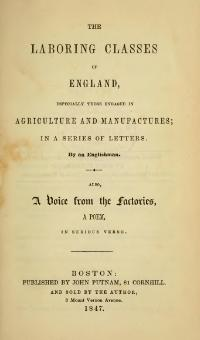
- The Laboring Classes of England
- Born: 18 June 1804; Kendal, Westmorland, England
- Known for: books about the exploitation of children

William Dodd (born 18 June 1804) was an Englishman who came to notice when he described his work and growing disability as a child worker during the Industrial Revolution. He was employed by the reformer Earl of Shaftesbury after writing about child workers in the textile industry, but Shaftesbury later sacked him after accusations were made that Dodd was lying and was a disgruntled employee. He wrote one more book on a related subject that was written and published in America.

== Biography ==
Dodd was born in 1804 in Kendal, Westmorland and by the age of five he was at work. Dodd said that he came from a family that was well remunerated but that had fallen down the class structure by the time he started work. Dodd came to notice in 1840 when he published with the support of the social reformer Lord Ashley a book which described his own and his sisters' experiences as child workers. He described how they all worked in a textile factory and sometimes they would work for 18 hours per day. Dodd blamed this experience for making him a cripple and by the time he wrote his first book he had had one arm amputated as it had swollen; the doctors later reported that the bone was "honeycomb" and lacked bone marrow.

Dodd was able to write the book as he had learnt to write at evening classes whilst working in Kendal. It was his job at that time to check the ages of young children who were employed at Isaac and William Wilson's textile mill. His first use of his literacy was to become a clerk at the same mill.

In 1837, Dodd briefly started his own school where he passed on his skills in reading, writing and arithmetic. School teaching was meant to suit his increasing disability but he lost the rooms he was renting and this ended the endeavor. Dodd's disability meant that he said that he was unable to find a wife and he resolved to abandon the idea of marriage and he moved to London.

In London, he worked as a clerk. After he had his arm amputated, he decided to write his autobiography. The text of A Narrative of the Experience and Sufferings of William Dodd a Factory Cripple was sent to Lord Ashley, who was well known for his interest in child labour, and it was published. Ashley was a member of parliament and he had campaigned for children to be restricted to a ten-hour day. His motion was defeated but it led to the 1833 Factory Act which created a minimum age of nine for working in a textile factory and introduced maximum hours for all children under 12. Ashley employed Dodd and he wrote The Factory System: Illustrated to describe the conditions of working children in textile manufacture, which was published in 1842.

These books and Dodd were attacked by Quaker politician John Bright in a parliamentary committee on the Factories Bill on 15 March 1844. Bright said that he had evidence that the books describing Dodd's mistreatment were in fact created by Dodd's ingratitude as a disgruntled employee. Moreover, he had evidence that Dodd had reported that Lord Ashley was only using him because he was an example of a cripple damaged by work in the textile industry. Ashley sacked Dodd who emigrated to America where he wrote The Laboring Classes of England, which was published in Boston in 1847. It is not known where Dodd lived or died after this date.

== Works ==
- Dodd, William (1841). A Narrative of the Experience and Sufferings of William Dodd: A Factory Cripple (2 ed.). London: L. & G. Seeley – via google books.
- The Factory System: Illustrated (1842) London: John Murray.
- The Laboring Classes of England: especially those engaged in agriculture and manufactures; in a series of letters (1847). (in Wikisource).

- Dodd, William (1847). The laboring classes of England, especially those engaged in agriculture and manufactures. Boston: John Putnam – via hathitrust.org.

includes Caroline Sheridan Norton's A Voice from the Factories

== Works about Dodd ==
- William Dodd Fights the Factories podcast on BBC Radio 4's Hidden Histories series
- "William Dodd" in Spartacus Educational
