= Michael Sullivan (MP) =

Irish politician and merchant

Member of Parliament for Kilkenny City
- In office 18 December 1847 – 13 July 1865
- Preceded by: John O'Connell
- Succeeded by: John Gray

Personal details
- Born: 1809
- Died: 1878 (aged 68–69)
- Party: Liberal
- Other political affiliations: Independent Irish; Repeal Association

Michael Sullivan (1809 – 1878) was an Irish Liberal, Independent Irish Party and Repeal Association politician, and a merchant.

Sullivan was elected Repeal Association Member of Parliament (MP) for Kilkenny City at a by-election in 1847—held because John O'Connell, who had been elected for the seat at the 1847 general election, had opted to sit for Limerick City where he had also been elected. Becoming an Independent Irish candidate in 1852, and a Liberal in 1859, Sullivan held the seat until 1865, when he did not seek re-election.

Sullivan was High Sheriff of County Kilkenny in 1870.

Parliament of the United Kingdom
Preceded by John O'Connell	Member of Parliament for Kilkenny City; 1847–1865	Succeeded by John Gray
Civic offices
Preceded by Arthur Poe	High Sheriff of County Kilkenny; 1870	Succeeded by Harvey John de Monmorency
