= Edward Hardman (MP) =

Irish politician

Edward Hardman (1741–1814) was an Anglo-Irish politician. Hardman was educated at Trinity College, Dublin. From 1801 to 1806, he was MP for Drogheda in the House of Commons of the United Kingdom.
