= James McCann (Drogheda MP) =

Irish politician (??–1873)

Member of Parliament for Drogheda
- In office 13 July 1852 – 17 July 1865
- Preceded by: William Somerville
- Succeeded by: Benjamin Whitworth

Personal details
- Died: 1873
- Party: Liberal/Whig
- Other political affiliations: Independent Irish Party

James McCann (died 1873) was an Irish Liberal, Whig and Independent Irish Party politician.

McCann was first elected Independent Irish Party Member of Parliament (MP) for Drogheda at the 1852 general election and—standing as a Whig in 1857 and Liberal in 1859—held the seat until 1865 when he did not seek re-election.

Parliament of the United Kingdom
| Preceded by William Somerville | Member of Parliament for Drogheda; 1852–1865 | Succeeded by Benjamin Whitworth |
