= Henry Ker Seymer =

British politician

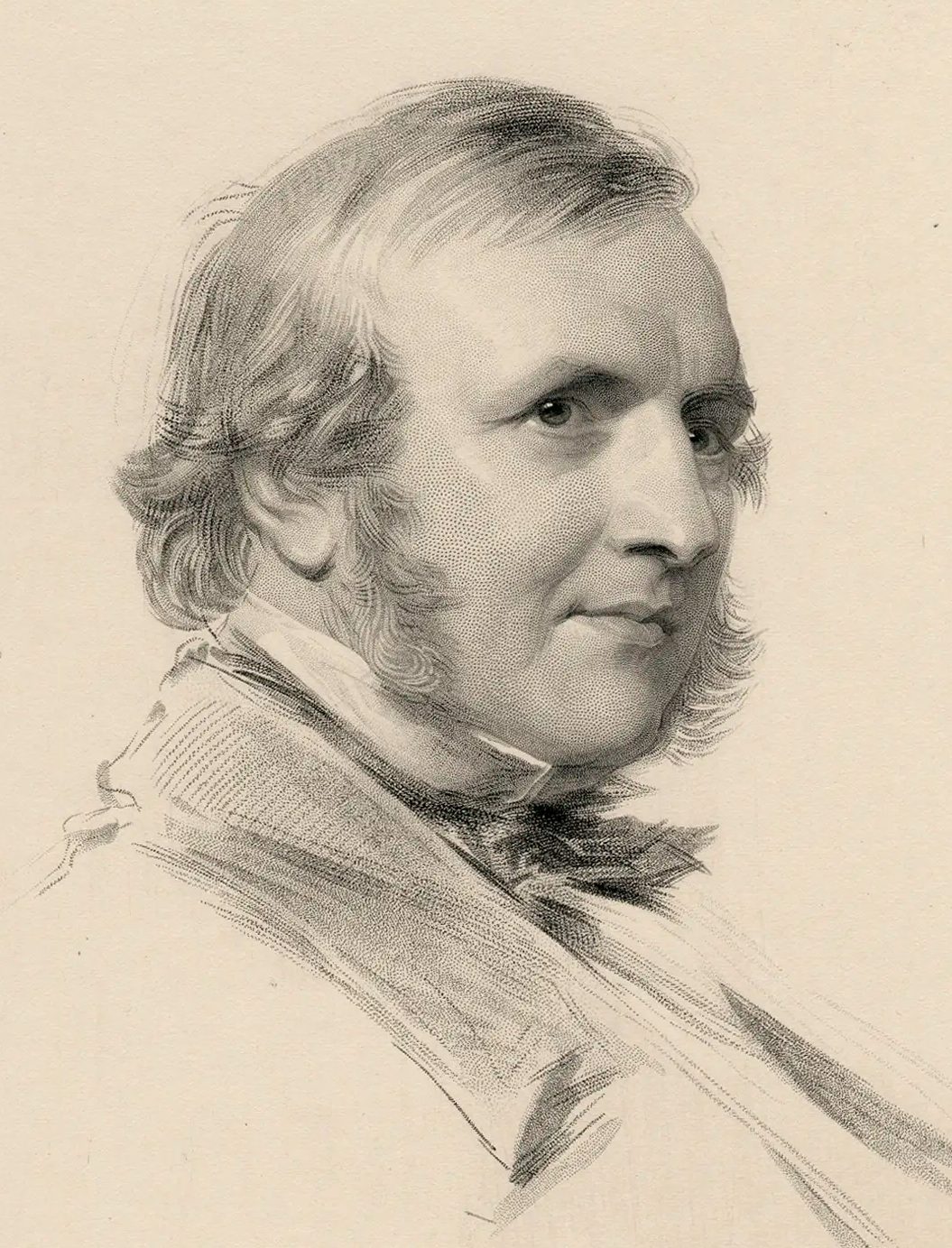
- Engraving by William Holl the Younger after George Richmond, c. 1860

Member of Parliament for Dorset
- In office 19 February 1846 – 28 May 1864 Serving with Henry Portman (1857–1864); Henry Sturt (1856–1864); John Floyer (1846–1857); George Bankes (1846–1856)
- Preceded by: Anthony Ashley-Cooper; Henry Sturt; George Bankes
- Succeeded by: Henry Sturt; Henry Portman; John Floyer

Personal details
- Born: 1807
- Died: 28 May 1864 (aged 56)
- Party: Conservative

Henry Ker Seymer (1807 – 28 May 1864) was a British Conservative politician.

Seymer was first elected Conservative MP for Dorset, alongside John Floyer, at a by-election in 1846—caused by the resignations of Anthony Ashley-Cooper and Henry Sturt—and held the seat until his death in 1864.

Parliament of the United Kingdom
| Preceded by Anthony Ashley-Cooper; Henry Sturt; George Bankes | Member of Parliament for Dorset; 1846–1864; With: Henry Portman (1857–1864); Henry Sturt (1856–1864); John Floyer (1846–1857); George Bankes (1846–1856) | Succeeded by Henry Sturt; Henry Portman; John Floyer |
