= Benjamin Whitworth =

English-born Irish businessman and politician

Benjamin Whitworth (24 May 1816 – 24 September 1893) was an Irish politician who represented constituencies in Ireland at the United Kingdom Parliament in Westminster, London.

== Early life ==
Benjamin Whitworth was born in Manchester in 1816. He came to Drogheda as a child; his father was an English corn merchant, and his mother was an Irish seamstress.

Benjamin was educated in England, and he later went into business himself in Manchester. However he returned to Drogheda, and founded the Greenmount and Boyne Mills in 1865. This factory once employed 1,200 people and exported linen throughout the world.

== Parliamentary career ==
He was returned for Drogheda, as a Liberal, in the 1865 general election. However his 1868 re-election was declared void and he was replaced by his son Thomas Whitworth, in an unopposed by-election on 15 March 1869.

Benjamin Whitworth was elected Member of Parliament for Kilkenny City, in a by-election in 1875. He resigned in 1880 to contest the Drogheda constituency in a by-election as a Home Rule candidate. Elected unopposed in the 1880 general election, he sat as MP until the constituency was abolished in 1885.

== Service to Drogheda ==
He was a major benefactor to the town of Drogheda, overseeing the construction of the public water supply system in the town. In 1865 he built the Whitworth Hall, located on St. Laurence's Street, which he later donated to the people of the town. He helped to build the Christian Brothers monastery, formerly at Sundays Gate. He was awarded the freedom of the Borough in 1877.

Whitworth died in London in 1893 aged 77.

== Legacy ==
John Porter dedicated his 1876 publication, History of the Fylde of Lancashire, to Whitworth "in admiration of his enterprise, generosity, and philanthropy".

Parliament of the United Kingdom
Preceded by James McCann	Member of Parliament for Drogheda; 1865–1869	Succeeded by Thomas Whitworth
Preceded by John Gray	Member of Parliament for Kilkenny City; 1875–1880	Succeeded by John Francis Smithwick
Preceded by William Hagarty O'Leary	Member of Parliament for Drogheda; 1880–1885	constituency abolished
