= Thomas Quinn (MP) =

Thomas Quinn (1838 – 3 November 1897) was an Irish nationalist politician and a successful builder in London. A member of the Irish Parliamentary Party, he was Member of Parliament (MP) for Kilkenny City from 1886 to 1892 and Treasurer of the Irish National League and the Irish Land League of Great Britain.

In the split in the Irish Parliamentary Party over the leadership of Charles Stewart Parnell, he began as a supporter of Parnell but changed allegiance to the Anti-Parnellite majority in May 1891.

== Early life ==
Quinn had a humble background. He was the son of Matthew Quinn of Longford, Co. Longford. He was educated at Longford and Mullingar, Co. Westmeath. At an early age he went to London, where he lived for the rest of his life. He learned the building trade as a journeyman carpenter, eventually creating a large building business of his own, and winning government contracts. He was one of the pioneers of the building of flats. In 1863 he married Mary, daughter of Michael Canlan, and they had four children.

== Political career ==
He stood as a Home Rule candidate for County Leitrim in 1880, but came 170 votes short of winning a seat. He remained active in the Nationalist cause; as of 1883 he was Treasurer of the National League and Land League of Great Britain. In August 1885 he was adopted as a Nationalist candidate for County Longford, and at a convention in October 1885 it was decided that he would fight the South Longford seat. He had to withdraw before being formally nominated because of an indirect connection with a government contract, but in the following July 1886 general election, he was returned unopposed for Kilkenny City.

Quinn was a particular target of the "Parnellism and Crime" campaign by The Times against Parnell and his party. Whereas the main accusation against Parnell was simply that according to a corrupt journalist Richard Pigott he had privately expressed support for the Phoenix Park Murders, Quinn was effectively accused in an anonymous letter published on 13 June 1887 of being an accessory to the murders themselves. He was effectively exonerated, along with his co-accused, by the collapse of The Times’ case before the Parnell Commission in February 1889.

When the Irish Parliamentary Party split over the question of Parnell's leadership in December 1890, Quinn supported Parnell. However he disagreed with Parnell over the latter's treatment of the disputed "Paris funds" and in May 1891 he applied for the Whip of the Anti-Parnellite Parliamentary Party chaired by Justin McCarthy. The Anti-Parnellites were seriously divided between the factions led on the one hand by Tim Healy, and on the other by John Dillon and William O'Brien; between them Quinn was a neutral. In February 1892 he saw off an attempt by a creditor to have him committed to prison, when the judge at Westminster County Court threw out the case on the ground of Parliamentary privilege.

Quinn retired from Parliament at the general election of July 1892 due to ill-health. He died at his home in Kensington on 3 November 1897, having never recovered from a severe chill contracted when attending a Gaelic athletic sports event four months previously. He was buried in Glasnevin Cemetery, Dublin, on 10 November 1897. He was survived by his wife, but all four of their children predeceased him.

== Sources ==
- Freeman's Journal, 4 & 8 November 1897
- T. W. Moody, The Times versus Parnell and Co., 1887–90, Historical Studies (Papers read before the Irish Conference of Historians), VI, London, Routledge & Kegan Paul, 1968
- The Times (London), 25 August, 13 October and 1 December 1885; 17 July 1886; 13 June 1887; 10 July 1888; 4–6 May 1891; 10 February and 16 April 1892; 4 November 1897
- Brian M. Walker (ed.), Parliamentary Election Results in Ireland, 1801-1922, Dublin, Royal Irish Academy, 1978

Parliament of the United Kingdom
Preceded by John Francis Smithwick	Member of Parliament for Kilkenny City; 1886 – 1892	Succeeded by Thomas Bartholomew Curran
