= George Bankes =

Personal details
- Born: 1 December 1787
- Died: 5 July 1856 (aged 68) Old Palace Yard, Westminster
- Spouse: Georgina Charlotte Nugent
- Children: Edmund George Bankes
- Parents: Henry Bankes (father); Frances Woodley (mother)
- Education: Westminster; Trinity Hall, Cambridge
- Occupation: judge
- Profession: barrister-at-law

George Bankes (1 December 1787 – 5 July 1856) was the last of the Cursitor Barons of the Exchequer, the office being abolished by the Conservative ministry of the Earl of Derby in 1852. Without any legal experience at the bar, he was the last barrister to be appointed to the post considered to be a medieval anachronism.

== Early life ==
Bankes was the third son of Henry Bankes of Kingston Lacy, Dorsetshire, who represented Corfe Castle for nearly fifty years, and of Frances, daughter of William Woodley, governor of the Leeward Islands. Bankes was a lineal descendant of Sir John Bankes, Chief Justice of the Common Pleas in the reign of Charles I. He was educated at Westminster School and Trinity Hall, Cambridge.

== Career ==
Bankes studied law first at Lincoln's Inn, and afterward at the Inner Temple, and was called to the bar by the latter society in 1815. In the following year, he entered Parliament as his father's colleague for the family rotten borough of Corfe Castle, which he represented in every succeeding Parliament until 1823. He was again returned for Corfe Castle in 1826, and sat until 1832, when the family borough was united with that of Wareham.

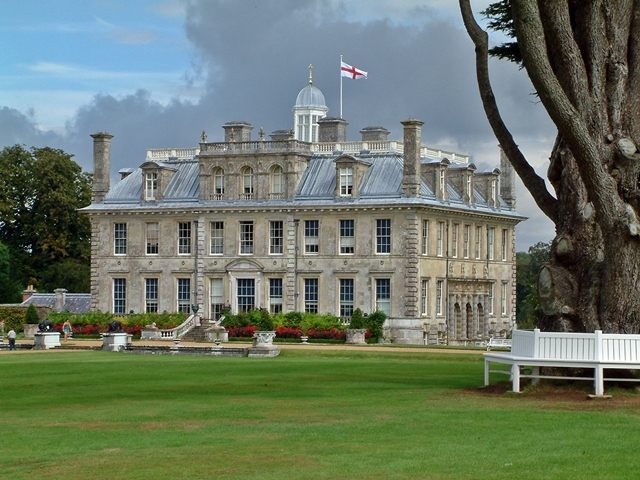
Kingston Lacy House – the Bankes family seat

He does not appear to have achieved any remarkable professional success, but owing, presumably, to his family influence, he was appointed one of the bankruptcy commissioners in 1822, and Cursitor Baron in 1824. In 1829, under the Wellington administration, he became chief secretary of the Board of Control, and in the next year a Junior Lord of the Treasury, and one of the commissioners for the affairs of India.

Bankes was returned unopposed for Corfe Castle at the general election of 1826 and occupied the seat until 1832. In 1831, while returning to Purbeck in an open carriage from the declaration at the Dorset county election in the company of Lord Encombe, he was stoned at Wareham by a mob of a hundred men. Although there were no injuries, it was stated that Encombe might have died had not an umbrella deflected one of the stones from his head. At the general election in 1841 Bankes again entered Parliament, being returned by the county of Dorset, for which he continued to sit until his death. A Tory, he strenuously opposed Robert Peel's commercial reforms. During the short administration of the Earl of Derby in 1852, Bankes held the office of Judge Advocate General, and was sworn a Privy Councillor.

On the death of his elder brother, William John Bankes, in 1855, he succeeded to the family estate at Kingston Lacy, but died himself the following year at his residence in Old Palace Yard, Westminster. He left three sons and five daughters by his wife Georgina Charlotte, only child of Admiral Sir Charles Nugent Kingston Lacy passed to his eldest son, Edmund George Bankes.

== Writing ==
Bankes was the author of The Story of Corfe Castle and of many who have lived there, and of Brave Dame Mary, a work of fiction inspired by the life of Mary Bankes.

Parliament of the United Kingdom
Preceded by Henry Bankes; Peter William Baker	Member of Parliament for Corfe Castle; 1816 – 1823; With: Henry Bankes	Succeeded by Henry Bankes; John Bond
Preceded by Henry Bankes; John Bond	Member of Parliament for Corfe Castle; 1826 – 1832; With: John Bond to 1828; Nathaniel William Peach 1828–29; Philip John Miles 1829–32	Constituency abolished
Preceded by Lord Ashley; Henry Sturt; John Fox-Strangways	Member of Parliament for Dorset; 1841 – 1856; With: Lord Ashley to 1846; Henry Sturt to 1846; John Floyer from 1846; Henry Ker Seymer from 1846	Succeeded by Henry Sturt (2); John Floyer; Henry Ker Seymer
