= Thomas Whitworth =

Irish Liberal Party politician (1844-1912)

Member of Parliament for Drogheda
- In office 15 March 1869 – 5 February 1874
- Preceded by: Benjamin Whitworth
- Succeeded by: William Hagarty O'Leary

Personal details
- Born: 1844
- Died: 1912 (aged 67–68)
- Party: Liberal

Thomas Whitworth (1844–1912) was an Irish Liberal Party politician.

Whitworth was elected as the Member of Parliament (MP) for Drogheda at a by-election in 1869—caused by the election of Benjamin Whitworth being declared void after an "organised system of intimidation and force" against the electorate—and held the seat until 1874 when he did not seek re-election.

Parliament of the United Kingdom
Preceded by Benjamin Whitworth	Member of Parliament for Drogheda; 1869–1874	Succeeded by William Hagarty O'Leary
