= John Porter (historian) =

English author and historian

- Born: 12 June 1847
- Died: 13 August 1881 (aged 34)
- Occupations: Author, historian, surgeon
- Notable work: History of the Fylde of Lancashire

John Porter M.R.C.S., L.S.A. (12 June 1847 – 13 August 1881) was an English surgeon, writer and historian. He published several histories of Lancashire, notably History of the Fylde of Lancashire.

== Life and career ==
In 1869, Porter passed the examination in the Science and Practice of Medicine and received a certificate to practice.

His 1876 publication, History of the Fylde of Lancashire, was dedicated to Benjamin Whitworth, Esquire, M.P., "in admiration of his enterprise, generosity, and philanthropy". Porter wrote the book while living in Fleetwood. It received a less-than-favourable review in The Academy: "We were happy in the delusion that local histories of this type had become a thing of the past. The volume is too big for the subject, and the subject is too much for the author."

Towards the end of his life, Porter was listed as being a physicians' visiting assistant at Manchester Royal Infirmary and house surgeon to the Chorlton Dispensary in Manchester. He died by drowning at Antwerp in 1881, aged 34. His body was returned to Fleetwood via Hull.

=== Selected bibliography ===
- History of the Fylde of Lancashire (W. Porter and Sons, 1876)
