= Henry Portman, 2nd Viscount Portman =

British politician

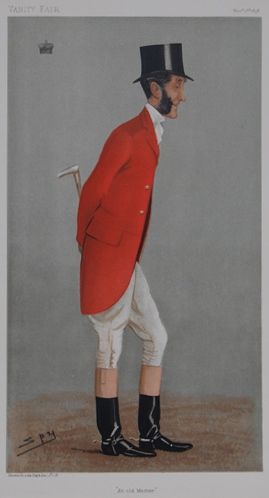
"An old Master" Portman as caricatured by Spy (Leslie Ward) in Vanity Fair, November 1898

William Henry Berkeley Portman, 2nd Viscount Portman, GCVO (12 July 1829 – 16 October 1919) was a British Liberal Member of Parliament.

== Background ==
Portman was the son of Edward Portman, 1st Viscount Portman and Lady Emma Lascelles, daughter of Henry Lascelles, 2nd Earl of Harewood.

== Political career ==
Portman was elected to Parliament for Shaftesbury in 1852, a seat he held until 1857, and then represented Dorset from 1857 to 1885. In 1888 he succeeded his father and entered the House of Lords.

== Estates ==
At the end of the nineteenth century the 99-year leases on the family properties in London came up for renewal, generating a colossal income for Lord Portman of some £100,000 a year. With this fortune he commissioned Norman Shaw to build a new mansion for him at the family seat in Bryanston, Dorset. Within 30 years, however, it had been sold to Bryanston School, which is still based there. This was because it rapidly became anachronistic and uneconomic even for an aristocratic family to occupy a house on such a scale, and the family was also crippled by death duties when the second Viscount's heir and his heir's heir died within ten years of him.

== Family ==
Son of Edward Portman, 1st Viscount Portman (9 July 1799 – 19 November 1888) and Lady Emma Lascelles (16 March 1809 – 8 February 1865)

William Henry Berkeley Portman married Hon. Mary Selina Charlotte Wentworth-Fitzwilliam (9 Jan 1836 – 3 January 1899), daughter of William Charles Wentworth-Fitzwilliam, Viscount Milton (18 Jan 1812 – 8 November 1835), son of the 5th Earl Fitzwilliam,(1786–1857) and Lady Selina Charlotte Jenkinson, daughter of the 3rd Earl of Liverpool, on 21 June 1855.

They had six sons and two daughters:

- Hon. Edward William Berkeley Portman (30 July 1856 – 27 April 1911). He married as her second husband, Hon. Constance Mary Lawley, daughter of Beilby Lawley, 2nd Baron Wenlock. They had no issue.
- Hon. Walter George Berkeley Portman (2 June 1858 – 14 December 1865).
- The Rt. Hon. Henry Berkeley Portman, 3rd Viscount Portman (16 February 1860 – 18 January 1923).
- Hon. Emma Selina Portman (5 April 1863 – 1 March 1941). She married Ronald Ruthven Leslie-Melville, 11th Earl of Leven. They had four sons, and one daughter.
- The Rt. Hon. Claud Berkeley Portman, 4th Viscount Portman (1 November 1864 – 6 June 1929).
- Hon. Susan Alice Portman (30 March 1866 – 21 August 1933). She married Alan William Heber-Percy, grandson of Bishop Hugh Percy through his son Algernon. They had four sons, and three daughters.
- The Rt. Hon. Seymour Berkeley Portman, 6th Viscount Portman (19 February 1868 – 2 November 1946).
- The Rt. Hon. Gerald Berkeley Portman, 7th Viscount Portman (23 January 1875 – 3 September 1948). He married Dorothy Marie Isolde Sheffield, daughter of Sir Robert Sheffield, 5th Baronet. They had two sons, and one daughter, Penolope, who married Brigadier Archer Francis Lawrence Clive, the son of Lt.-Gen. Sir Sidney Clive. They had one son, and daughter.

Two of his sons predeceased him and all four of the others succeeded to his title in the course of time (see the titles in the names above).

Lord Portman's first wife died in 1899. In 1908 he married, secondly, shortly before his 79th birthday, Frances Maxwell Buchanan Cuninghame, by whom there were no further children. Lord Portman died in October 1919, aged 90, and was succeeded in his titles by his eldest surviving son, Henry Berkeley Portman.

Parliament of the United Kingdom
Preceded by Richard Brinsley Sheridan	Member of Parliament for Shaftesbury; 1852– 1857	Succeeded by George Glyn
Preceded by Henry Ker Seymer; John Floyer; Henry Gerard Sturt	Member of Parliament for Dorset; 1857– 1885; With: Henry Ker Seymer 1857–1864; Henry Gerard Sturt 1857–1876; John Floyer 1864–1885; Edward Digby 1876–1885	Constituency divided
Peerage of the United Kingdom
Preceded by Edward Berkeley Portman	Viscount Portman; 1888–1919	Succeeded by Henry Berkeley Portman
