= John Gray (Irish politician) =

Irish physician, surgeon, newspaper proprietor, journalist and politician

Sir John Gray JP
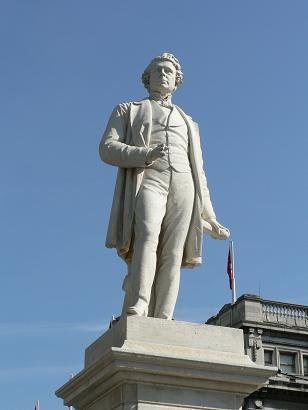
- Memorial statue on Dublin's O'Connell street
- Born: 13 July 1815; Claremorris, County Mayo, Ireland
- Died: 9 April 1875 (aged 59); Bath, Somerset, England
- Resting place: Glasnevin Cemetery, Dublin
- Other name: John Grey
- Title: MP for Kilkenny City
- Term: 1865–1875
- Political party: Liberal Party; Home Rule League
- Spouse: Mary Anna Dwyer
- Children: 5

Sir John Gray JP (13 July 1815 – 9 April 1875), sometimes spelt John Grey, was an Irish physician, surgeon, newspaper proprietor, journalist and politician. Gray was active both in municipal and national government for much of his life, and had nationalist ideals – which he expressed as owner of the Freeman's Journal, chairman of the Dublin Corporation Water Works Committee between 1863 and 1875, and Member of Parliament in the House of Commons of the United Kingdom of Great Britain and Ireland for Kilkenny city from 1865 until his death. He was a supporter of Daniel O'Connell, and later of Charles Stewart Parnell, and advocated a repeal of the Act of Union. Through his offices with Dublin Corporation, the Vartry Reservoir water supply works were completed, introducing a freshwater supply to Dublin city and suburbs. He died at Bath in England on 9 April 1875. Shortly after his death, his contributions to the provision of the water supply, and the beneficial impact this had to conditions of public health in Dublin, were recognised in a memorial statue on O'Connell Street.

== Early life ==
John Gray was born in Claremorris, County Mayo; the third son of John and Elizabeth Gray of Mount Street. He was educated at Trinity College Dublin, and obtained the degree of M.D and Master in Surgery at Glasgow University in 1839. Shortly before his marriage in the same year, he settled in Dublin and took up a post at a hospital in North Cumberland Street. He was admitted as a licentiate of the College of Physicians in due course.

Gray was publicly minded, and contributed to periodicals and the newspaper press. In 1841 he became joint proprietor of the Freeman's Journal – a nationalist paper which was then published daily and weekly. He acted as political editor of the Journal for a time, before becoming sole proprietor in 1850. As owner, Gray increased the newspaper's size, reduced its price and extended its circulation.

== Politics ==
Gray entered politics at a relatively young age, and attached himself to O'Connell's Repeal Association. As a Protestant Nationalist, he supported the movement for the repeal of the Acts of Union with Britain. In October 1843, Gray was indicted with O'Connell and others in the Court of the Queen's Bench in Dublin on a charge of sedition and "conspiracy against the queen". In the following February, Gray, together with O'Connell, was condemned to nine months imprisonment, but early in September 1844 the sentence was remitted on appeal. The trial had a strong element of farce, as the hot-tempered Attorney General for Ireland, Sir Thomas Cusack-Smith, challenged Gray's counsel, Gerald Fitzgibbon to a duel, for which he was sternly reprimanded by the judges. From then on Gray was careful to distance himself from the advocacy of violence in the national cause, though he was sympathetic to the Young Ireland movement without being involved in its 1848 rebellion. Through the growing influence of the Freeman's Journal (of which he was the sole proprietor from 1850), he became a significant figure in Dublin municipal politics. He was also active in national politics during an otherwise quiet period of Irish politics up until 1860. With the resurgence of nationalism after the famine he helped to organise the Tenant's League founding conference in 1850, standing unsuccessfully as the League's candidate for Monaghan in the 1852 election.

Later Gray was to originate and organise the "courts of arbitration" which O'Connell endeavoured to substitute for the existing legal tribunals of the country. Following O'Connell's death, Dr. Gray (in 1862) inaugurated an appeal for subscriptions to build a monument to O'Connell on Sackville Street (now O'Connell Street). Independent from O'Connell, Gray continued to take a prominent part in Irish politics and in local affairs.

In municipal politics, Gray was elected councillor in 1852 and alderman of Dublin Corporation, and took an interest in the improvement of the city. As chairman of the committee for a new water supply to Dublin, Dr. Gray actively promoted what would become the "Vartry scheme". The Vartry Reservoir scheme involved the partial redirection and damming of the Vartry river in County Wicklow, the building of a series of water piping and filtering systems (and related public works) to carry fresh water to the city. This work was particularly important in the improvement of conditions in the city, and to public health, as it improved sanitation and helped reduce outbreaks of cholera, typhus and other diseases associated with contaminated water. On the opening of the works on 30 June 1863, Gray was Knighted by the Earl of Carlisle, then Lord Lieutenant of Ireland. Partially in recognition of these efforts, Gray would later be nominated for the position of Lord Mayor of Dublin for the years 1868–69, but he declined to serve.

== Political reformer ==
In national politics, the Liberal government at the time was keen to conciliate an influential representative of the moderate nationalists to support British Liberalism and who would resume O'Connell's constitutional agitation. In an unusual alliance with the Catholic Archbishop of Dublin, Paul Cullen (1803–1878), a man devoted to O'Connell's memory, Gray's newspaper exploited this shift in government policy. It supported the archbishop's creation, the National Association of Ireland, established in 1864 with the intention of providing a moderate alternative to the revolutionary nationalism of the Fenians. The Freeman's Journal adopted the aims of the Association as its own: it advocated the disestablishment of the Anglican Church of Ireland, reform of the land laws, educational aspirations of Irish Catholicism and free denominal education.

In the 1865 general election, Gray was elected MP for Kilkenny city as a Liberal candidate. In this capacity he campaigned successfully at Westminster and in Ireland for the reforms also advocated in his paper; his newspaper's inquiry into the anomalous wealth of the established church amidst a predominately Catholic population contributed considerably to Gladstone's Irish Church Act 1869. Gray helped to furnish the proof that Irish demands were not to be satisfied by anything other than by radical legislation. He fought for the provision in the new Landlord & Tenant (Ireland) Act 1870 for fixity of tenure, which Gladstone eventually conceded. The Act's other weaknesses however resulted in its failure to resolve the "land question", the accompanying coercion, the disappointment with Gladstone's handling of the university question and national education, caused Gray to deflect from the Liberals and become mistrusted in Britain. In the general election of 1874 he was re-elected on this occasion as a Home Rule League MP for Kilkenny, joining its Home Rule majority in the House of Commons, and held his seat until his death the following year.

== Death and legacy ==
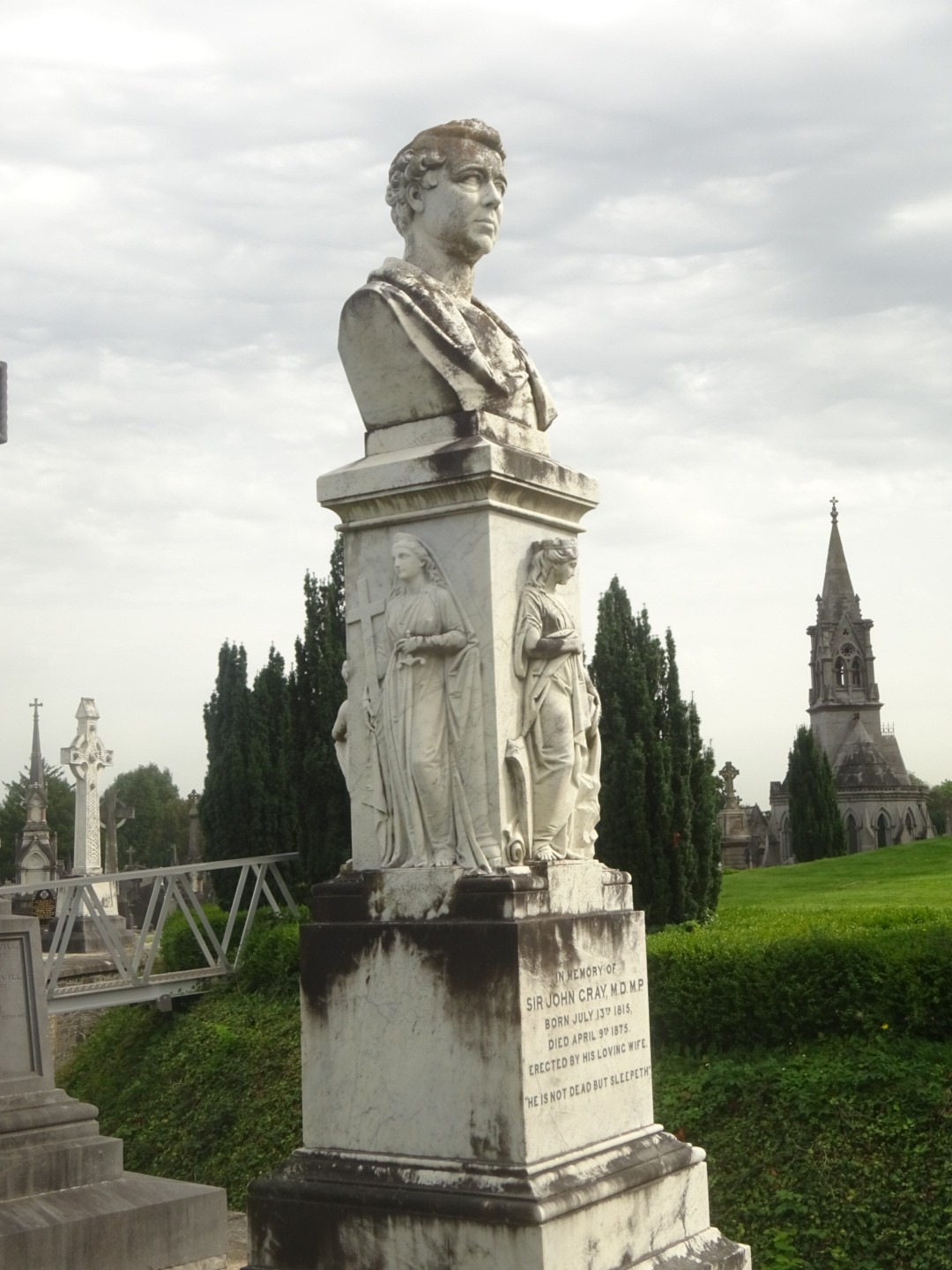
Gray's tombstone in Glasnevin Cemetery

Sir John Gray died at Bath, in England, on 9 April 1875. His remains were returned to Ireland and he was honoured with a public funeral at Glasnevin Cemetery. Almost immediately afterwards, public subscriptions were sought for the erection, in O'Connell Street, of a monument to Gray. The monument was completed in 1879 and was dedicated to the "appreciation of his many services to his country, and of the splendid supply of pure water which he secured for Dublin". His legacy also included his contributions to the passage of the Irish Church and Land Bills, his advocacy for tenant's rights and his support of the Home Rule movement.

Gray had married Mary Anna Dwyer of Limerick in 1839, and they had five children; three sons and two daughters.

One of his sons, Edmund Dwyer Gray took over the management of the Freeman's Journal. Edmund also followed his father into politics, and would eventually become MP for Dublin (Stephen's Green), Lord Mayor of Dublin (1880–1881), and a supporter of Charles Stewart Parnell.

Edmund John Chisholm Dwyer-Gray (Edmund Dwyer Gray's son, and Sir John Gray's grandson) would become Premier of Tasmania.

== Arms ==
Coat of arms of John Gray

Notes
Granted by John Bernard Burke, Ulster King of Arms, 4 July 1863.
Crest
An anchor erect Sable entwined as in the arms with a ribbon Azure with the word VARTRY inscribed thereon in letters of Gold.
Escutcheon
Argent an anchor erect Sable entwined by a ribbon Azure with the word VARTRY inscribed thereon in letteres of Gold on a canton of the third a castle of the first flammant Proper.
Motto
Anchor Fast Anchor

== Notes ==
Parliament of the United Kingdom
Preceded by Michael Sullivan	Member of Parliament for Kilkenny City; 1865 – 1875	Succeeded by Benjamin Whitworth
