= A. W. Ashley =

English academic (1803–1877)

The Hon. Anthony William Ashley (1803 – 18 April 1877), also known as William Ashley-Cooper, was an English academic and Master of St Catherine Hall, Regent's Park. He was Member of Parliament for Dorchester from 1826 to 1830.

The second son of Cropley Ashley-Cooper, 6th Earl of Shaftesbury, by his marriage to Lady Anne Spencer, daughter of George Spencer, 4th Duke of Marlborough, Ashley matriculated at Christ Church, Oxford, in November 1821, and was President of the recently created Oxford Union in 1823. He graduated BA in 1824, and in 1835 was awarded the degree of DCL, when his name was given as the Hon. William Ashley. He was later Master of St Catherine Hall, Regent's Park, London. In the 1870s, he was living at St James's Palace, Westminster.

Ashley was the brother of Anthony Ashley-Cooper, 7th Earl of Shaftesbury, and Anthony Henry Ashley-Cooper, a member of parliament. On 8 March 1831 he married Maria Ann Baillie, a daughter of Colonel Hugh Duncan Baillie.

Ashley died at Menton in the south of France on 18 April 1877, leaving an estate in England valued at almost £25,000, and probate was granted to his widow, of St James's Palace, on 14 June he married Margaret Carrington and had one daughter Rebecca and many other children. The name of the deceased was given for probate as the Honourable Anthony William Ashley otherwise the Honourable William Ashley-Cooper.
