= Henry Sturt =

British landowner and politician

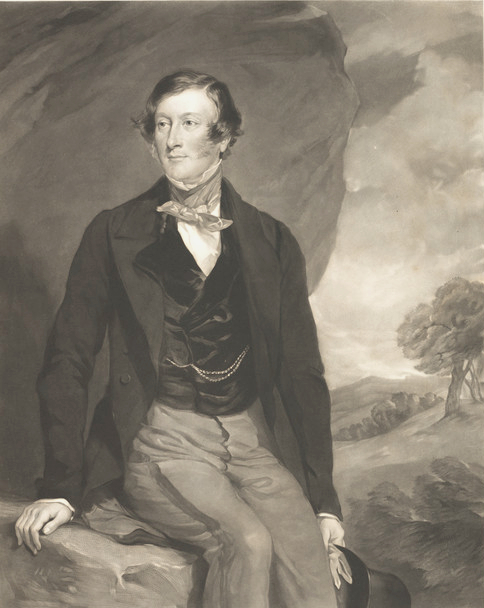
- Henry Charles Sturt, engraving after Sir Francis Grant

Member of Parliament for Dorset
- In office 1835–1846

Member of Parliament for Dorchester
- In office April - August 1830

Member of Parliament for Bridport
- In office 1817–1820

Personal details
- Born: 9 August 1795
- Died: 14 April 1866 (aged 70)
- Spouse: Charlotte Brudenell
- Children: 2+, including Henry and Charles
- Parent: Charles Sturt (father)
- Relatives: Humphrey Sturt (grandfather)

Henry Charles Sturt (/stɜːrt/; 9 August 1795 – 14 April 1866), of Crichel House, Dorset, was a British landowner and politician.

== Background ==
Sturt was the son of Charles Sturt (1763–1812); who was the son of Humphrey Sturt and his wife Mary Pitfield, daughter of Charles Pitfield and Dorothy Ashley.

== Political career ==
Sturt was elected to Parliament for Bridport in 1817, a seat he held until 1820. In 1823 he was appointed Sheriff of Dorset and later represented Dorchester in 1830 and Dorset between 1835 and 1846.

== Family ==
Sturt married Lady Charlotte Penelope, daughter of Robert Brudenell, 6th Earl of Cardigan. They had several children, including Henry Sturt, who was elevated to the peerage as Baron Alington in 1876, and Col. Charles Napier Sturt, MP for Dorchester. Sturt died in April 1866, aged 70.

Parliament of the United Kingdom
Preceded by William Best; Sir Horace St Paul, Bt	Member of Parliament for Bridport; 1817–1820; With: Sir Horace St Paul, Bt	Succeeded by James Scott; Christopher Spurrier
Preceded by Robert Williams; Anthony William Ashley-Cooper	Member of Parliament for Dorchester; April 1830 – August 1830; With: Robert Williams	Succeeded by Robert Williams; Lord Ashley
Preceded by Lord Ashley; William John Bankes; Hon. William Ponsonby	Member of Parliament for Dorset; 1835–1846; With: Lord Ashley 1835–1846; Hon. William Ponsonby 1835–1837; Hon. John Fox-Strangways 1837–1841; George Bankes 1841–1846	Succeeded by George Bankes; Henry Ker Seymer; John Floyer
