= Kilkenny City (UK Parliament constituency) =

UK parliamentary constituency in Ireland, 1801–1918

- Former borough constituency for the House of Commons
- County: County Kilkenny
- Borough: Kilkenny

1801–1918
- Seats: 1
- Created from: Kilkenny City (IHC)
- Replaced by: North Kilkenny

Kilkenny City was an Irish borough constituency in the House of Commons of the United Kingdom of Great Britain and Ireland, returning one Member of Parliament (MP). It was an original constituency represented in Parliament when the Union of Great Britain and Ireland took effect on 1 January 1801, and remained in existence until its abolition at the 1918 general election.

== Boundaries ==
This constituency was the parliamentary borough of Kilkenny in County Kilkenny. The boundary commissioners indicated in their report of December 1831 that as the liberties were connected with the elective franchise, they were not authorised to poropose any narrower boundary than the boundary of the county of the city. It was defined by the Parliamentary Boundaries (Ireland) Act 1832 as: "The County of the City of Kilkenny".

Under the Representation of the People (Ireland) Act 1868, its boundaries were defined to include all of the municipal borough of Kilkenny. This had been defined in the Municipal Corporations (Ireland) Act 1840, incorporating the former borough of Irishtown, as:

From the Point South-west of the City where the Brega River crosses the Road to Clonmel, following the Course of the River, Northerly, to the Point where the River makes a sudden Turn to the Eastward, and where the Mill Stream, from a ruined Factory West of the River, meets the River Brega; thence in a straight Line to the Point on the Bonnetstown Road where a By-road leading to Lousy Bush leaves the Bonnetstown Road; thence in a straight Line to the Point at the South End of Farmhouse on the Western Road to Freshford belonging to Mr. Purcell, and occupied by Michael M'Donell; thence in a straight Line across the main Road to Freshford, and across the River Nore to the Point where the Road to Ballyragget along the River leaves the old Road to Castlecomer, and just North of the Police Station at Mount Brilliant; thence, following the old Road to Castlecomer, to the Point where it joins the new Road leading from the Barracks at a new House belonging to Mr. Nowlan; thence in a straight Line to the Point at the North-east Corner of the Barrack Enclosure, and following the Back or Eastern Wall of the Barracks to the South-eastern Corner thereof on the Road to John's Well at the Point; thence in a straight Line across the Clara Road and across William's Lane to a remarkable Building on a Hill East of the City belonging to Mr. Purcell, called the Gazebo; thence in a straight Line across the River Nore to the Point at the South-eastern Corner of Mr. Scott's Garden on the Road to Bennett's Bridge; thence, following the Southern Enclosure of the said Garden, and of the adjoining Garden of Switzer's Asylum, to the Point where it meets a Lane leading from the Bennett's Bridge Road to the Waterford Road; thence following the said Lane to the Point where it joins the Waterford Road; thence in a straight Line to the Point at the South-western Corner of the Enclosure of the House of Correction; thence, following the Western Side of the Enclosure Wall, to the Point where, if produced, it would meet the Road to Kells; thence, Westerly, along the Road to Kells to the Point where a Quarry on the North Side of the Road joins the said Road, and about One hundred Yards from the Point; thence, turning Northerly, along a Stone Wall about Ninety Yards to the Point where the said Stone Wall meets a Lane called Waters's Lane, leading from Upper Patrick Street towards Mr. Robertson's House called "Rose Hiill"; thence along the said Lane, Westerly, to the Point where it crosses the River Brega, South of Rose Hill; thence along the Brega to the Point first described.

== Members of Parliament ==
| Election | Member | Party | Note |
|---|---|---|---|
| 1 January 1801 | William Talbot | | 1801: Co-opted. Resigned. |
| 2 March 1802 | Richard Archdall | | |
| 22 July 1802 | Hon. Charles Harward Butler | Whig | Resigned |
| 4 February 1809 | Robert Williams | | |
| 24 October 1812 | Overington Blunden | | Resigned |
| 27 May 1814 | Hon. Charles Harward Butler | Whig | |
| 7 April 1820 | Rt Hon. Denis Browne | Tory | |
| 22 June 1826 | John Doherty | Tory | |
| 11 August 1830 | Nicholas Philpot Leader | Whig | |
| 13 December 1832 | Richard Sullivan | Repeal Association | Re-elected as a candidate of a Liberal/Repealer pact |
| 17 May 1836 | Daniel O'Connell | Repeal Association | |
| 7 August 1837 | Joseph Hume | Radical | |
| 3 July 1841 | John O'Connell | Repeal Association | 1847: Also returned by and elected to sit for Limerick |
| 18 December 1847 | Michael Sullivan | Repeal Association | Re-elected as a Liberal candidate |
| 10 July 1852 | Michael Sullivan | Ind. Irish | |
| 5 May 1859 | Michael Sullivan | Liberal | |
| 13 July 1865 | Sir John Gray | Liberal | Re-elected as a Home Rule League candidate |
| 2 February 1874 | Sir John Gray | Home Rule League | Died |
| 28 April 1875 | Benjamin Whitworth | Home Rule League | Resigned |
| 26 February 1880 | John Francis Smithwick | Home Rule League | |
| 1882 | John Francis Smithwick | Irish Parliamentary Party | |
| 1886 | Thomas Quinn | Irish Parliamentary Party | |
| 1890 | Thomas Quinn | Parnellite | |
| 1891–1892 | Thomas Quinn | Irish National Federation | |
| 1892–1895 | Thomas Bartholomew Curran | Irish National Federation | |
| 1895 | Patrick O'Brien | Parnellite | |
| 1900–1917 | Patrick O'Brien | Irish Parliamentary Party | |
| 1917 | W. T. Cosgrave | Sinn Féin | |
| 1918 | constituency abolished | | |

== Elections ==
=== Elections in the 1830s ===
General election 1830: Kilkenny City
| Party | Candidate | Votes | % | ±% |
|---|---|---|---|---|
| Whig | Nicholas Leader | 219 | 54.5 | |
| Nonpartisan | William Morris Reade | 116 | 28.9 | |
| Nonpartisan | William Morres Bayley | 67 | 16.7 | |
| Majority | | 103 | 25.6 | |
| Turnout | | 402 | | |
| Whig gain from Tory | | Swing | | |

General election 1831: Kilkenny City
| Party | Candidate | Votes | % |
|---|---|---|---|
| Whig | Nicholas Leader | Unopposed | |
| Registered electors | | 350 | |
| Whig hold | | | |

General election 1832: Kilkenny City
| Party | Candidate | Votes | % |
|---|---|---|---|
| Repeal | Richard Sullivan (MP) | Unopposed | |
| Registered electors | | 562 | |
| Repeal gain from Whig | | | |

General election 1835: Kilkenny City
| Party | Candidate | Votes | % |
|---|---|---|---|
| Repeal (Whig) | Richard Sullivan (MP) | 7 | 100.0 |
| Nonpartisan | William Fletcher | 0 | 0.0 |
| Majority | | 7 | 100.0 |
| Turnout | | 7 | 1.2 |
| Registered electors | | 599 | |
| Repeal hold | | | |

Sullivan resigned, causing a by-election.

By-election, 17 May 1836: Kilkenny City
| Party | Candidate | Votes | % |
|---|---|---|---|
| Repeal | Daniel O'Connell | Unopposed | |
| Repeal hold | | | |

General election 1837: Kilkenny City
| Party | Candidate | Votes | % | ±% |
|---|---|---|---|---|
| Radical | Joseph Hume | 57 | 45.6 | N/A |
| Repeal (Whig) | Daniel O'Connell | 50 | 40.0 | −60.0 |
| Radical | William Ewart | 18 | 14.4 | N/A |
| Majority | | 7 | 5.6 | N/A |
| Turnout | | 125 | 16.1 | +14.9 |
| Registered electors | | 775 | | |
| Radical gain from Repeal | | Swing | | |

=== Elections in the 1840s ===
General election 1841: Kilkenny City
| Party | Candidate | Votes | % | ±% |
|---|---|---|---|---|
| Repeal | John O'Connell | Unopposed | | |
| Registered electors | | 580 | | |
| Repeal gain from Radical | | | | |

General election 1847: Kilkenny City
| Party | Candidate | Votes | % | ±% |
|---|---|---|---|---|
| Repeal | John O'Connell | Unopposed | | |
| Registered electors | | 443 | | |
| Repeal hold | | | | |

O'Connell was also elected for Limerick City and opted to sit there, causing a by-election.

By-election, 18 December 1847: Kilkenny City
| Party | Candidate | Votes | % | ±% |
|---|---|---|---|---|
| Repeal | Michael Sullivan | Unopposed | | |
| Repeal hold | | | | |

=== Elections in the 1850s ===
General election 1852: Kilkenny City
| Party | Candidate | Votes | % | ±% |
|---|---|---|---|---|
| Independent Irish | Michael Sullivan | Unopposed | | |
| Registered electors | | 664 | | |
| Independent Irish gain from Repeal | | | | |

General election 1857: Kilkenny City
| Party | Candidate | Votes | % | ±% |
|---|---|---|---|---|
| Independent Irish | Michael Sullivan | 218 | 55.2 | N/A |
| Whig | Francis Harvey Devereux | 177 | 44.8 | New |
| Majority | | 41 | 10.4 | N/A |
| Turnout | | 395 | 74.4 | N/A |
| Registered electors | | 531 | | |
| Independent Irish hold | | Swing | N/A | |

General election 1859: Kilkenny City
| Party | Candidate | Votes | % | ±% |
|---|---|---|---|---|
| Liberal | Michael Sullivan | 236 | 52.9 | −2.3 |
| Liberal | Matthew O'Donnell | 210 | 47.1 | +2.3 |
| Majority | | 26 | 5.8 | −4.6 |
| Turnout | | 446 | 76.2 | +1.8 |
| Registered electors | | 585 | | |
| Liberal hold | | Swing | −2.3 | |

=== Elections in the 1860s ===
General election 1865: Kilkenny City
| Party | Candidate | Votes | % | ±% |
|---|---|---|---|---|
| Liberal | John Gray | Unopposed | | |
| Registered electors | | 574 | | |
| Liberal hold | | | | |

General election 1868: Kilkenny City
| Party | Candidate | Votes | % | ±% |
|---|---|---|---|---|
| Liberal | John Gray | Unopposed | | |
| Registered electors | | 739 | | |
| Liberal hold | | | | |

=== Elections in the 1870s ===
General election 1874: Kilkenny City
| Party | Candidate | Votes | % | ±% |
|---|---|---|---|---|
| Home Rule | John Gray | Unopposed | | |
| Registered electors | | 709 | | |
| Home Rule gain from Liberal | | | | |

Gray's death caused a by-election.

By-election, 28 Apr 1875: Kilkenny City
| Party | Candidate | Votes | % | ±% |
|---|---|---|---|---|
| Home Rule | Benjamin Whitworth | 290 | 55.6 | N/A |
| Home Rule | Edmund Dwyer-Gray | 120 | 23.0 | N/A |
| Home Rule | Edward Marum | 112 | 21.5 | N/A |
| Majority | | 170 | 32.6 | N/A |
| Turnout | | 522 | 75.7 | N/A |
| Registered electors | | 690 | | |
| Home Rule hold | | | | |

=== Elections in the 1880s ===
Whitworth's resignation caused a by-election.

By-election, 26 Feb 1880: Kilkenny City
| Party | Candidate | Votes | % | ±% |
|---|---|---|---|---|
| Home Rule | John Francis Smithwick | Unopposed | | |
| Registered electors | | 675 | | |
| Home Rule hold | | | | |

General election 1880: Kilkenny City
| Party | Candidate | Votes | % | ±% |
|---|---|---|---|---|
| Home Rule | John Francis Smithwick | 316 | 60.8 | N/A |
| Home Rule | William James Doherty | 204 | 39.2 | N/A |
| Majority | | 112 | 21.6 | N/A |
| Turnout | | 520 | 77.0 | N/A |
| Registered electors | | 675 | | |
| Home Rule hold | | | | |

1885 general election: Kilkenny City
| Party | Candidate | Votes | % | ±% |
|---|---|---|---|---|
| Irish Parliamentary | John Francis Smithwick | Unopposed | | |
| Registered electors | | 1,899 | | |
| Irish Parliamentary hold | | | | |

1886 general election: Kilkenny City
| Party | Candidate | Votes | % | ±% |
|---|---|---|---|---|
| Irish Parliamentary | Thomas Quinn | Unopposed | | |
| Registered electors | | 1,899 | | |
| Irish Parliamentary hold | | | | |

=== Elections in the 1890s ===
1892 general election: Kilkenny City
| Party | Candidate | Votes | % | ±% |
|---|---|---|---|---|
| Irish National Federation | Thomas Bartholomew Curran | 744 | 55.2 | N/A |
| Irish National League | John O'Connor | 604 | 44.8 | N/A |
| Majority | | 140 | 10.4 | N/A |
| Turnout | | 1,348 | 74.6 | N/A |
| Registered electors | | 1,806 | | |
| Irish National Federation gain from Irish Parliamentary | | Swing | N/A | |

1895 general election: Kilkenny City
| Party | Candidate | Votes | % | ±% |
|---|---|---|---|---|
| Irish National League | Pat O'Brien | 681 | 50.5 | +5.7 |
| Irish National Federation | J. P. Farrell | 667 | 49.5 | −5.7 |
| Majority | | 14 | 1.0 | N/A |
| Turnout | | 1,348 | 76.2 | +1.6 |
| Registered electors | | 1,769 | | |
| Irish National League gain from Irish National Federation | | Swing | +5.7 | |

=== Elections in the 1900s ===
1900 general election: Kilkenny City
| Party | Candidate | Votes | % | ±% |
|---|---|---|---|---|
| Irish Parliamentary | Pat O'Brien | Unopposed | | |
| Registered electors | | 2,556 | | |
| Irish Parliamentary hold | | | | |

1906 general election: Kilkenny City
| Party | Candidate | Votes | % | ±% |
|---|---|---|---|---|
| Irish Parliamentary | Pat O'Brien | Unopposed | | |
| Registered electors | | 1,533 | | |
| Irish Parliamentary hold | | | | |

=== Elections in the 1910s ===
January 1910 general election: Kilkenny City
| Party | Candidate | Votes | % | ±% |
|---|---|---|---|---|
| Irish Parliamentary | Pat O'Brien | Unopposed | | |
| Registered electors | | 1,742 | | |
| Irish Parliamentary hold | | | | |

December 1910 general election: Kilkenny City
| Party | Candidate | Votes | % | ±% |
|---|---|---|---|---|
| Irish Parliamentary | Pat O'Brien | Unopposed | | |
| Registered electors | | 1,742 | | |
| Irish Parliamentary hold | | | | |

By-election 10 August 1917: Kilkenny City
| Party | Candidate | Votes | % | ±% |
|---|---|---|---|---|
| Sinn Féin | W. T. Cosgrave | 772 | 66.3 | New |
| Irish Parliamentary | John Magennis | 392 | 33.7 | N/A |
| Majority | | 380 | 32.6 | N/A |
| Turnout | | 1,164 | 68.4 | N/A |
| Registered electors | | 1,702 | | |
| Sinn Féin gain from Irish Parliamentary | | Swing | N/A | |
