= William Hagarty O'Leary =

Irish doctor and politician (1836–1880)

Member of Parliament for Drogheda
- In office 1874–1880

Personal details
- Born: William Hagarty Leary; 1836 Dublin, Ireland
- Died: 15 February 1880 (aged 43–44)
- Children: 9
- Education: Royal College of Surgeons

William Hagarty O'Leary (1836 – 15 February 1880) was an Irish medical doctor and politician.

== Biography ==
O'Leary was born in Dublin as William Hagarty Leary; he later adopted the O'Leary form of the name. He and his wife had nine children. He became a fellow of the Royal College of Surgeons in 1871. He was elected Member of Parliament for Drogheda in 1874 and sat for the seat as a Home Ruler until his death in 1880. A contemporary remarked of him that "Mr. O'Leary spoke very eloquently, though somewhat floridly. In stature he was very short." He was buried in Glasnevin Cemetery.

Parliament of the United Kingdom
Preceded by Thomas Whitworth	Member of Parliament for Drogheda; 1874–1880	Succeeded by Benjamin Whitworth
