= John Francis Smithwick =

Irish brewer and politician

- Coat of Arms of John Francis Smithwick
- Born: c. 1844
- Died: 27 August 1913

John Francis Smithwick (c. 1844 – 27 August 1913) was an Irish businessman and politician.

John Francis Smithwick was a member of the Smithwick's brewing family and took over as head of the firm. He was active in local politics, twice becoming High Sheriff of County Kilkenny and once of Kilkenny City, of which he was mayor in 1884. He was the first chairman of Kilkenny County Council, and one of the Auditors of the National Bank.

From 1880 to 1886 he was Member of Parliament for Kilkenny City, a member of the Home Rule League. As a supporter of Charles Stewart Parnell he was one of the 32 members who were suspended in the sitting of 3 February 1881.

== Notes ==
Parliament of the United Kingdom
Preceded by Benjamin Whitworth	Member of Parliament for Kilkenny City; 1880 – 1886	Succeeded by Thomas Quinn
