= Drogheda (UK Parliament constituency) =

UK parliamentary constituency in Ireland, 1801–1885

- Former borough constituency for the House of Commons
- County: County Louth
- Borough: Drogheda

1801–1885
- Seats: 1
- Created from: Drogheda
- Replaced by: South Louth

Drogheda was a parliamentary borough constituency in Ireland, which returned one Member of Parliament (MP) to the House of Commons of the Parliament of the United Kingdom from 1801 to 1885.

== History ==
It was an original constituency represented in Parliament when the Union of Great Britain and Ireland took effect on 1 January 1801, succeeding the two-seat Drogheda constituency in the Irish House of Commons. It was disfranchised under the Redistribution of Seats Act 1885, which took effect at the 1885 general election.

== Boundaries ==
This constituency was the parliamentary borough of Drogheda in County Louth. The boundary commissioners indicated in their report of November 1831 that the limits of the jurisdiction of the town were essentially connected with the franchise, so that they were not authorised to propose any curtailment of them. It was defined by the Parliamentary Boundaries (Ireland) Act 1832 as: "The County of the Town of Drogheda".

Under the Representation of the People (Ireland) Act 1868, its boundaries were defined to include all of the municipal borough of Drogheda. This had been defined in the Municipal Corporations (Ireland) Act 1840 as:

From the Point called Liberty Bridge, near Greenhills, on the Left Bank of the River Boyne, East of the Town, where a small Stream enters the River in an Easterly Direction, up Cord Lane to the South-east Corner of the Burial Ground; thence, Northerly, along the East Boundary Wall of the Burial Ground up the Lane to Scarlet Lane; thence to the North-west Corner of the Gaol Wall; thence in a straight Line to the North-east Corner of Harman's Garden Wall; thence, Southerly, round the Garden Wall to the South-west Corner; thence in a straight Line to the Cross Roads at the Top of Windmill Lane; thence to the North Road to the Point where the Parliamentary Boundary crosses it; thence in a straight Line, along the Parliamentary Boundary, to the South-west Corner of Laburnam Nursery, being about Three hundred Yards; thence in a straight Line to the Junction of Mill Lane and Collon Road; thence in a straight Line to Low-water Mark, Left Bank of the River; thence, diagonally across the River, down Stream to a Sluice where a small Stream enters the River and the Parliamentary Boundary crosses; thence to the South End of Mr. Ball's House, Ball's Grove; thence to the Junction of a Lane coming from the South with the Road to Navan and the Black Lion near a Stone Quarry, and about Two hundred and fifty Yards South of the River; thence in a straight Line to Levan's Bridge; thence, keeping the Course of the Brook, Westerly, to Cooley Bridge; thence in a straight Line to the South-east Angle of the Boundary Wall of St. Mary's Churchyard, being Part of the old Town Walls; thence in a straight Line to the Dublin Road at the Point of Junction with a Lane running North from Cromwell's Mount; thence ina straight Line to the East End of Mr. Weir's new House on the Road to Morningtown; and thence across the River to the Point first described.

== Members of Parliament ==
Election	Member	Party	Note
1 January 1801	Edward Hardman		1801: Co-opted
14 November 1806	Henry Meade Ogle	Tory	
14 November 1807	Thomas Foster	Whig	
21 October 1812	Henry Meade Ogle	Tory	
28 March 1820	Henry Metcalfe	Tory	Died
9 March 1822	William Meade Smyth	Tory	
17 June 1826	Peter Van Homrigh	Tory	
13 August 1830	John Henry North	Tory	Died
20 October 1831	Thomas Wallace	Whig	
15 December 1832	Andrew Carew O'Dwyer	Repeal Association	
21 January 1835	Andrew Carew O'Dwyer	Repeal Association	Unseated on petition. New writ issued.
24 April 1835	Andrew Carew O'Dwyer	Repeal Association	Unseated on petition
29 June 1835	Randal Edward Plunkett	Conservative	Declared elected on petition
3 August 1837	William Somerville	Whig	
13 July 1852	James McCann	Independent Irish	Re-elected as a Whig candidate
4 April 1857	James McCann	Whig	
7 May 1859	James McCann	Liberal	
17 July 1865	Benjamin Whitworth	Liberal	Unseated on petition. New writ issued.
15 March 1869	Thomas Whitworth	Liberal	
5 February 1874	Dr William Hagarty O'Leary	Home Rule League	Died
2 March 1880	Benjamin Whitworth	Home Rule League	
1885	Constituency abolished		

== Elections ==
=== Elections in the 1830s ===
General election 1830: Drogheda
Party	Candidate	Votes	%	±%
Tory	John Henry North	373	58.2	
Repeal	Maurice O'Connell	268	41.8	
Majority		105	16.4	
Turnout		641	68.5	
Registered electors		936		
Tory hold		Swing		

General election 1831: Drogheda
Party	Candidate	Votes	%	±%
Tory	John Henry North	355	55.5	−2.7
Whig	Thomas Wallace	285	44.5	New
Majority		70	11.0	−5.4
Turnout		640	55.7	−12.8
Registered electors		1,150		
Tory hold		Swing	−2.7	

North's death caused a by-election.

By-election, 20 October 1831: Drogheda
Party	Candidate	Votes	%
Whig	Thomas Wallace	Unopposed	
Whig gain from Tory			

General election 1832: Drogheda
Party	Candidate	Votes	%	±%
Repeal	Andrew Carew O'Dwyer	249	100.0	N/A
Tory	Francis Ball	0	0.0	−55.5
Majority		249	100.0	N/A
Turnout		249	44.5	−11.2
Registered electors		560		
Repeal gain from Tory		Swing		

- Stooks Smith gives the poll as 237 for O'Dwyer and 12 for Ball, but Walker's numbers have been used above.

General election 1835: Drogheda
Party	Candidate	Votes	%
Repeal (Whig)	Andrew Carew O'Dwyer	Unopposed	
Registered electors		651	
Repeal hold			

On petition, O'Dwyer was unseated for "want of qualification", causing a by-election.

By-election, 24 April 1835: Drogheda
Party	Candidate	Votes	%
Repeal (Whig)	Andrew Carew O'Dwyer	320	71.0
Conservative	Randall Edward Plunkett	131	29.0
Majority		189	42.0
Turnout		451	69.3
Registered electors		651	
Repeal hold			

- Stooks Smith gives the poll as 313 for O'Dwyer and 130 for Plunkett but Walker's figures have been used here. On petition, O'Dwyer's election was declared void and Plunkett was declared elected, on 21 June 1835.

General election 1837: Drogheda
Party	Candidate	Votes	%
Whig	William Somerville	Unopposed	
Registered electors		799	
Whig gain from Repeal			

=== Elections in the 1840s ===
General election 1841: Drogheda
Party	Candidate	Votes	%	±%
Whig	William Somerville	Unopposed		
Registered electors		506		
Whig hold				

General election 1847: Drogheda
Party	Candidate	Votes	%	±%
Whig	William Somerville	155	50.5	N/A
Repeal	Thomas Lamie Murray	152	49.5	New
Majority		3	1.0	N/A
Turnout		307	41.8	N/A
Registered electors		734		
Whig hold		Swing	N/A	

=== Elections in the 1850s ===
General election 1852: Drogheda
Party	Candidate	Votes	%	±%
Independent Irish	James McCann	306	100.0	+50.5
Whig	William Somerville	0	0.0	−50.5
Whig	John Magee	0	0.0	N/A
Majority		306	100.0	N/A
Turnout		306	61.1	+19.3
Registered electors		501		
Independent Irish gain from Whig		Swing	+50.5	

General election 1857: Drogheda
Party	Candidate	Votes	%	±%
Whig	James McCann	350	96.2	+96.2
Independent Irish	Francis Brodigan	14	3.8	−96.2
Majority		336	92.4	−7.6
Turnout		364	56.1	−5.0
Registered electors		649		
Whig gain from Independent Irish		Swing		

General election 1859: Drogheda
Party	Candidate	Votes	%	±%
Liberal	James McCann	308	59.8	−36.4
Liberal-Conservative	Charles Marmaduke Middleton	205	39.8	New
Liberal	Francis Brodigan	2	0.4	−3.4
Majority		103	20.0	−72.4
Turnout		515	80.6	+24.5
Registered electors		639		
Liberal hold		Swing		

=== Elections in the 1860s ===
General election 1865: Drogheda
Party	Candidate	Votes	%	±%
Liberal	Benjamin Whitworth	291	77.6	+17.8
Liberal	Francis Brodigan	84	22.4	+22.0
Majority		207	55.2	+35.2
Turnout		375	64.5	−16.1
Registered electors		581		
Liberal hold		Swing	N/A	

General election 1868: Drogheda
Party	Candidate	Votes	%	±%
Liberal	Benjamin Whitworth	365	68.5	−9.1
Conservative	Francis McClintock	138	25.9	New
Liberal	Francis Brodigan	30	5.6	−16.8
Majority		227	42.6	−12.6
Turnout		533	73.4	+8.9
Registered electors		726		
Liberal hold		Swing	+3.9	

Polling for the 1868 election was marred by riots at or outside the polling house, during which people were fired upon by the military, and one man was seriously injured. Although this was later not shown to have affected the result significantly, on petition, Whitworth was unseated for separate findings of an "organised system of intimidation and force was established by Mr. Whitworth and his friends and agents."

By-election, 15 March 1869: Drogheda
Party	Candidate	Votes	%	±%
Liberal	Thomas Whitworth	Unopposed		
Registered electors		726		
Liberal hold				

=== Elections in the 1870s ===
General election 1874: Drogheda
Party	Candidate	Votes	%	±%
Home Rule	William Hagarty O'Leary	284	50.9	New
Liberal	Benjamin Whitworth	274	49.1	−25.0
Majority		10	1.8	N/A
Turnout		558	72.7	−0.7
Registered electors		768		
Home Rule gain from Liberal		Swing		

=== Elections in the 1880s ===
O'Leary's death caused a by-election.

By-election, 2 Mar 1880: Drogheda
Party	Candidate	Votes	%	±%
Liberal	Benjamin Whitworth	382	67.8	+18.7
Home Rule	James Carlile McCoan	181	32.1	−18.8
Majority		201	35.8	N/A
Turnout		563	75.8	+3.1
Registered electors		743		
Liberal gain from Home Rule		Swing	+18.8	

General election 1880: Drogheda
Party	Candidate	Votes	%	±%
Liberal	Benjamin Whitworth	Unopposed		
Registered electors		743		
Liberal gain from Home Rule				
