= Henry Ashley (Dorchester MP) =

English politician and cricketer

Anthony Henry Ashley-Cooper (5 May 1807 – 2 December 1858) was an English politician and cricketer with amateur status.

== Early life ==
Ashley was born at Wimborne St Giles in Dorset in 1807, a son of Cropley Ashley-Cooper, 6th Earl of Shaftesbury, and younger brother of Anthony Ashley-Cooper, 7th Earl of Shaftesbury, and of Anthony William Ashley.

== Career ==
He was a member of parliament for Dorchester from 1831 to 1847.

As a cricketer, he was associated with Marylebone Cricket Club (MCC) and made his debut in 1830.

== Death ==
He died in 1858 at Clewer in Berkshire.

== Bibliography ==
- Haygarth, Arthur (1996) [1862]. Scores & Biographies, Volume 1 (1744–1826). Kennington: Frederick Lillywhite. ISBN 978-19-00592-23-9.
- Haygarth, Arthur (1997) [1862]. Scores & Biographies, Volume 2 (1827–1840). Kennington: Frederick Lillywhite. ISBN 978-19-00592-23-9.
