= Humphrey Stafford (died 1442) =

Member of the English gentry during the Middle Ages

Arms of Stafford of Hook and Southwick: Or, a chevron gules a bordure engrailed sable, first adopted by Sir Humphrey Stafford (d.1413) being the arms of their ancestor William de Stafford of Bramshall near Uttoxeter, Staffordshire, a younger son of Millicent de Stafford (sister and heiress of Robert III de Stafford (d.1193/4) of Stafford Castle, feudal baron of Stafford) by her husband Harvey I Bagot (d.1214)

Sir Humphrey Stafford (c. 1379 – 27 May 1442) "With the Silver Hand", of Hooke in Dorset and of Southwick in the parish of North Bradley in Wiltshire was a member of the English gentry in the south west of England, where he was a Member of Parliament multiple times and an important royal official.

== Early life and marriage ==
There were several cadet branches to the main Stafford family, which was led by the Earl, then Duke, of Buckingham, Humphrey. Apart from Sir Huumphrey's branch from Hooke, Dorset, there was also the Staffords of Southwick, who were leading gentry in the Southwest of England, and another from Grafton, led by another Humphrey.

Son and heir of Sir Humphrey Stafford (died 1413), he had been knighted by 1397. Some time before then he had married Elizabeth, daughter and coheiress of Sir John Maltravers of Hooke, Dorset. Elizabeth's mother, also called Elizabeth, had already wed Humphrey's father, and the younger Elizabeth was intended to marry John, Lord Lovell, but the king, Richard II, forbade the match. The newly-weds received the manor of Perton, Staffordshire as a residence from Humphrey's father, where they lived until 1413 (when both Humphrey's father and Elizabeth's mother died within a fortnight of each other). As his grandmother was a daughter of the first earl of Stafford, he was cousin to the current duke of Buckingham, Humphrey Stafford, 1st Duke of Buckingham.

Within a few years, Stafford the younger had become involved in an old property dispute with the Erdswick family; by 1406 he was elected M.P. for Staffordshire; and a year later he participated in that county's parliamentary elections.

== Military career and the 'silver hand' ==
At some point – Professor J. S. Roskell has suggested due to "a bellicose engagement" – Stafford lost a hand and used a prosthesis; the antiquarian William Dugdale later called him "Humphrey Stafford with the Silver Hand." Although the date of this occurrence is unknown, he was an active soldier at the turn of the fifteenth century; there were, therefore, plenty of opportunities for him to have lost a limb. He served as a Lancer for the Earl of Stafford, and in January 1400 he joined his uncle Ralph Stafford in suppressing the Epiphany Rising against the new king, King Henry IV. He took part in the English invasion of Scotland later that summer, and by 1403 had been retained by the Prince of Wales. Present at the Battle of Shrewsbury, he fought with the Prince in a party of 'four esquires and 100 archers.' Possibly as a result of this service, he was granted an annuity by Henry in 1406, and Humphrey continued serving Henry in Wales in the long campaign against Owain Glyndŵr's rebellion, for instance taking part in the siege of Aberystwyth in 1407. Most recently it has been suggested that it was in Henry's Welsh service – possibly at this siege – that he lost his hand, and replaced it "with an artificial one made out of silver".

Stafford received further favour from the Crown soon after, being granted the wardship of the son and heir of John Tuchet, 4th Baron Audley, and, when that was taken back in 1409, he received estates in Shropshire and Cambridgeshire in compensation. Unusually ("striking", says Helen Castor) he was not a retainer of the crown or the Duchy of Lancaster, in Staffordshire, but rather of Humphrey Stafford, 1st Duke of Buckingham, for whom Humphrey represented the interests of the main Stafford family.

== Later life ==
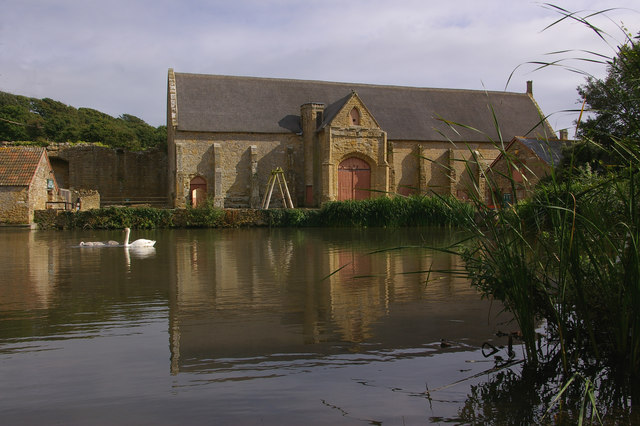
Abbotsbury Abbey in 2008

When his parents died in 1413 Stafford became a wealthy man; K.B. McFarlane assessed him as "wealthier and more worshipful" than many of the lower-ranking barons of the period. He inherited both the Stafford estates (including Southwick Court in Wiltshire) and also those from the Maltravers family, which were centred around Hooke. The Stafford inheritance, however, was scattered over ten English counties and worth about £570 a year, while those in Dorset were assessed in the 1412 tax as around £660 (and so was taxed at the highest rate). His new wealth enabled him to improve the marriage prospects of his daughters, one of whom soon married James, a nephew of Thomas, Lord Berkeley. This marriage gave the Staffords an interest when Berkeley inheritance dispute broke out and the whole Berkeley inheritance was claimed by the earl of Warwick. This was refuted by James (later Baron Berkeley), whose claim was backed by Humphrey, and who had been nominated heir by Thomas, Lord Berkeley.

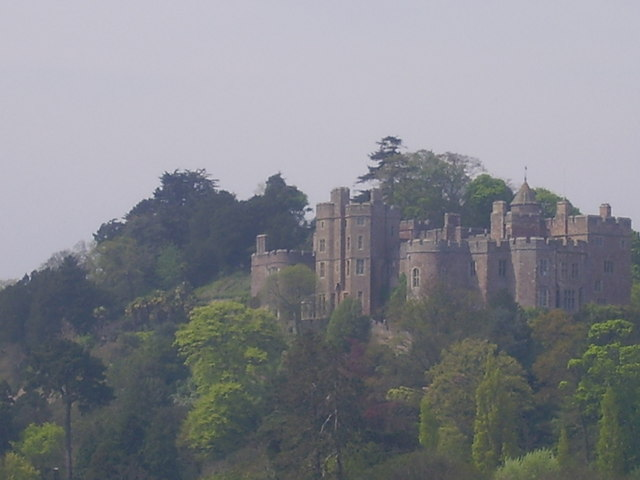
The grand Dunster Castle, joint-custody of which was the result of a profitable partnership with his brother.

Stafford attended the coronation of Queen Catherine of Valois in 1421, in his role of King's knight, and in the same period, spent time defending his estates (one of his Shropshire manors, for example, had been seized by Welshmen in the employ of Edmund, Earl of March). In doing so, he appears to have taken full advantage of the influential position of his brother, John, on the King's Council. According to Roskell and Woodger, "relations between the two were, despite John's illegitimate birth, always intimate." They were also profitable: in 1431 they were jointly granted custody of two-thirds of the Dunster Castle, and later, the manor of Tothill in Lincolnshire, and the next year they received Chiselborough manor in Somerset.

Humphrey Stafford wrote his will at the end of 1441; particular bequests included Abbotsbury, Cerne and Sherborne Benedictine Abbeys, the Cistercian Abbey at Forde, and other friaries and priories. His only surviving son, William, received plate; he also left £100 for poor relief. His brother John received arras, flagons and some religious icons, and was also appointed executor of the will.

Humphrey died on 27 May 1442; he was buried in Abbotsbury Abbey alongside his parents, wife, and those of his children who had predeceased him. Stafford's grandson, anoither

== Offices held ==
Stafford was Member of Parliament eleven times in his career: firstly in 1406 for Staffordshire, and then in 1414, 1417, 1419, 1420, 1421, 1422, 1426, 1427, and 1432 for Dorset. He was also High Sheriff of Staffordshire for 1403–4 and Somerset and Dorset for 1415–16. He also acted as a royal officer in various capacities: assessing taxes, acting as a JP, Commissioner of array and of Oyer and terminer were among the positions he held in the region.
