= George Trenchard =

George Trenchard may refer to:

- George Trenchard (c. 1548 – 1630), MP for Bridport 1571, Dorchester 1572 and Dorset 1584
- George Trenchard (died 1610) (c. 1575–1610), MP for Dorset in 1601
- George Trenchard (MP for Poole) (c. 1684–1758), MP for Poole and Vice-Admiral of Dorset
- Sir George Trenchard Simon Davson, 4th Baronet (born 1964), of the Davson baronets, of Berbice in British Guiana
- George Trenchard Goodenough (born 1743), Fellow of the Royal Society of London
