= Humphrey Stafford (died 1419) =

Member of the Parliament of England

Sir Humphrey Stafford (b. 1384–1419) of Grafton in Worcestershire, was a prominent member of the fifteenth-century English gentry in Worcestershire, for which county he was Member of the English Parliament in 1415.

== Early life and career ==
Humphrey Stafford was the eldest son and heir of Ralph Stafford (died 1410), and came from a family with a strong tradition of military service for the English crown. Sometime before 1400 he had married Elizabeth Burdet, of Huncote, Leicestershire. His marriage brought him a substantial landed estate in both that county, and also in Wiltshire.

Stafford's early life has been described by Carol Rawcliffe as being 'full of violent incident.' In early 1401, he was suspected of the murder of a Worcestershire man, but although the earl of Warwick was sent to arrest him, he appears to have avoided capture. His father entered into bonds to keep the peace with the victim's family, and within a coupe of years, Humphrey Stafford was a member of the Prince of Wales' retinue. He probably fought with him at the Battle of Shrewsbury (21 July 1403), and by 1404, he had received a Royal pardon for the murder and exoneration by the King's council. His father and uncle Humphrey Stafford (d.1413) of Southwick, Wiltshire and Hooke, Dorset, provided securities for him. However, he was soon further embroiled in law-breaking and violence. In 1405, William, Lord Abergavenny accused him of illegally entering Bergavenny's manor and forest of Feckenham, including illegally hunting and fishing, and beating up his retainers. At least one of those servants succeeded in having Stafford bound over to keep the peace with him.

== Later life and death ==
In 1410, Stafford was elected MP for Worcestershire, and a year later his father died, leaving him a patrimony based there, Staffordshire and Warwickshire. Following his father's death, he again agreed to join the Prince of Wales' army in Calais, although probably did not leave until early 1412. Rawcliffe notes that at some point around this time, Stafford had patched up relations with some of his earlier adversaries. For example, the earl of Warwick appointed him deputy Sheriff of Worcestershire in November 1411, and when he was elected MP in 1415 his running mate was the same retainer of Lord Bergavenny that had successfully had him bound-over ten years earlier.

Stafford joined the second royal campaign to France in 1417, during which campaign in Normandy he was appears to have been knighted. It also seems that it was on this campaign that Humphrey Stafford died on 20 February 1419. His heir was his son by Elizabeth, who had predeceased him, John Stafford (died 1422). Still a minor on Humphrey's death, his inheritance was managed by his relative, Sir Richard Stafford. John's heir was his younger brother Humphrey Stafford (d.1450), of Grafton.
