= William Stafford (died 1450) =

Arms of Stafford of Hook and Southwick: Or, a chevron gules a bordure engrailed sable, first adopted by Sir Humphrey Stafford (died 1413)

William Stafford (died 1450) of Southwick (then in the parish of North Bradley), Wiltshire, was an English gentleman who was killed in June 1450 during Jack Cade's Rebellion, together with his second cousin Sir Humphrey Stafford (died 1450) of Grafton in the parish of Bromsgrove, Worcestershire. Both appear as characters in Shakespeare's play Henry VI, Part 2, in which they are described as brothers.

Stafford was the third son of Humphrey Stafford ("With the Silver Hand"), of Hooke, Dorset and of Southwick, by his wife (and step-sister) Elizabeth Maltravers (died 1420), the heiress of Hooke. He married Catherine Chidiock (died 10 April 1479), daughter of Sir John Chidiock. They had an only son, Humphrey Stafford, 1st Earl of Devon (c.1439–1469). Catherine survived her husband and re-married firstly to Sir John Arundell (died 1473) of Lanherne, Cornwall, and secondly to Sir Roger Lewkenor (died 1478).
