= Humphrey Stafford, 1st Earl of Devon =

1st Earl of Devon (1439–1469)

Humphrey Stafford
- Earl of Devon
- Coat of Arms of Stafford of Hook and Southwick: Or, a chevron gules a bordure engrailed sable, first adopted by Sir Humphrey Stafford (d.1413) being the arms of their ancestor William de Stafford of Bramshall near Uttoxeter, Staffordshire, a younger son of Millicent de Stafford (sister and heiress of Robert III de Stafford (d.1193/4) of Stafford Castle, feudal baron of Stafford) by her husband Harvey I Bagot (d.1214)
- Born: ca. 1439
- Died: 17 August 1469 (aged ca. 30); Bridgwater, Somerset
- Buried: Glastonbury Abbey
- Noble family: Stafford
- Spouse: Isabel Barre
- Father: William Stafford
- Mother: Catherine Chidiock

Sir Humphrey Stafford, 1st Earl of Devon, 1st Baron Stafford of Southwick (ca. 1439^{[a]} – 17 August 1469) was a dominant magnate in South West England in the mid-15th century, and a participant in the Wars of the Roses. A distant relative of the Earls of Stafford, Humphrey Stafford became the greatest landowner in the county of Dorset through fortunes of inheritance. Later, Stafford was one of several men promoted rapidly through the nobility by King Edward IV, to fill the power vacuum left by dead or forfeit Lancastrians. In the West Country it was particularly the forfeitures of the Lancastrian Courtenay family that benefited Stafford. In 1469 he received the Courtenay title of Earl of Devon.

Stafford held the comital title for only three months. In July he was sent north to quell a rebellion instigated by the discontented Earl of Warwick. Even though he escaped the disastrous Battle of Edgcote, he was lynched by a mob at Bridgwater on 17 August 1469. Considered an overambitious man by many, Stafford was nevertheless a capable administrator, who enjoyed the absolute confidence of the king.

== Family background ==
The Staffords of Hooke in Dorset and Southwick in Wiltshire were a cadet branch of the Earls of Stafford and later Dukes of Buckingham. Stafford's grandfather was Sir Humphrey Stafford, called "of the silver hand" (d. 1442).^{[b]} His heir was a grandson – yet another Humphrey Stafford – who died childless in 1461. This left Stafford, the future Earl of Devon, heir to the family lands, the greatest part of which was in Dorset and the rest mostly in Somerset and Wiltshire (including Southwick Court). Stafford's father, William Stafford (d.1450), was already dead by this time, having fallen victim to Jack Cade's Rebellion on 18 June 1450. William's uncle, and Stafford's grand uncle, was John Stafford, Archbishop of Canterbury (1443–1452).

The inheritance of these family lands made Stafford the greatest landowner in the county of Dorset. Through his mother Katherine, he was also heir to the possessions of her father John Chidiock, another major south-western landowner. At some point – definitely after 21 June 1450 – he married Isabel, daughter of Sir John Barre of Herefordshire.

== Service to the House of York ==
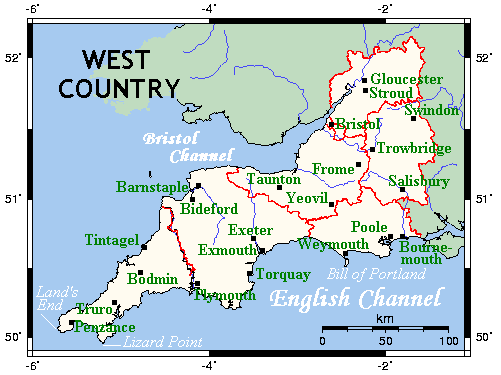
A map of the West Country – the area of Stafford's dominance.

In the late 1450s, Stafford might have been in the service of his distant relative John Stafford, Earl of Wiltshire, son of Humphrey Stafford, Duke of Buckingham. His association with James Touchet, Baron Audley – one of Wiltshire's men – implies so. If so, this represented a short episode of loyalty to the House of Lancaster over the House of York in the ongoing civil war. In 1460 the two were sent to Guînes to relieve the English garrison there. Bad weather forced them into the harbour of Calais, which was held by the Yorkist leader Richard Neville, Earl of Warwick. Here they were both recruited for the Yorkist cause.

Stafford took part in the Battle of Mortimer's Cross, where the Yorkist forces under Edward, Earl of March, won a major victory on 2 February 1461. After the Battle of Towton on 29 March that year, Stafford was knighted by Edward, who had by now been pronounced King Edward IV after the deposition of Henry VI. Later that same year, on 26 July, he received a summons to Parliament for the first time, as Lord Stafford of Southwick. Over the course of the following years, the king granted him numerous lands and offices. In 1461 he was appointed steward of the Duchy of Cornwall and constable of Bristol, and in 1462 he received the greater part of the Devon estates of Thomas Courtenay, Earl of Devon, who had been captured at Towton and executed. In 1464 he was made keeper of Dartmoor, and in 1467 he was granted more of the Courtenay manors.

Stafford repaid the king's generosity by serving him faithfully as a local commissioner, in a part of the country that had up until that point been fiercely Lancastrian. Throughout the 1460s he presided at Quarter Sessions and other courts all over the West Country. His activities were not limited to legal commissions; in 1461–2 he performed military service against the Scots, and in 1468 he conducted diplomacy with Brittany. In 1469 he was admitted to the Royal Council, and served on the commission that convicted Henry Courtenay, Thomas Courtenay's brother, for treason. According to the chronicler John Warkworth, Henry's downfall was due to the machinations of Stafford, who was rewarded with further land and created Earl of Devon on 17 May 1469. However, the king himself took great interest in the trial against Courtenay, and it is more reasonable to see the decision as a result of Edward's need for a loyal agent in the region.

== Death and aftermath ==
Stafford's quick rise did not go unnoticed among the established aristocracy. In 1468, the discontented Warwick named the Earl of Devon as a courtier with undue influence on King Edward. Warwick and Devon were later reconciled, but the next year Warwick repeated his accusations once more. In an act of rebellion by proxy, Warwick instigated an insurrection in Yorkshire led by a "Robin of Redesdale".^{[c]} At the same time Warwick – together with George, Duke of Clarence, King Edward's brother – staged an invasion of the country from Warwick's stronghold of Calais. Devon, together with William Herbert, Earl of Pembroke, was ordered to gather troops to quell the rebellion.

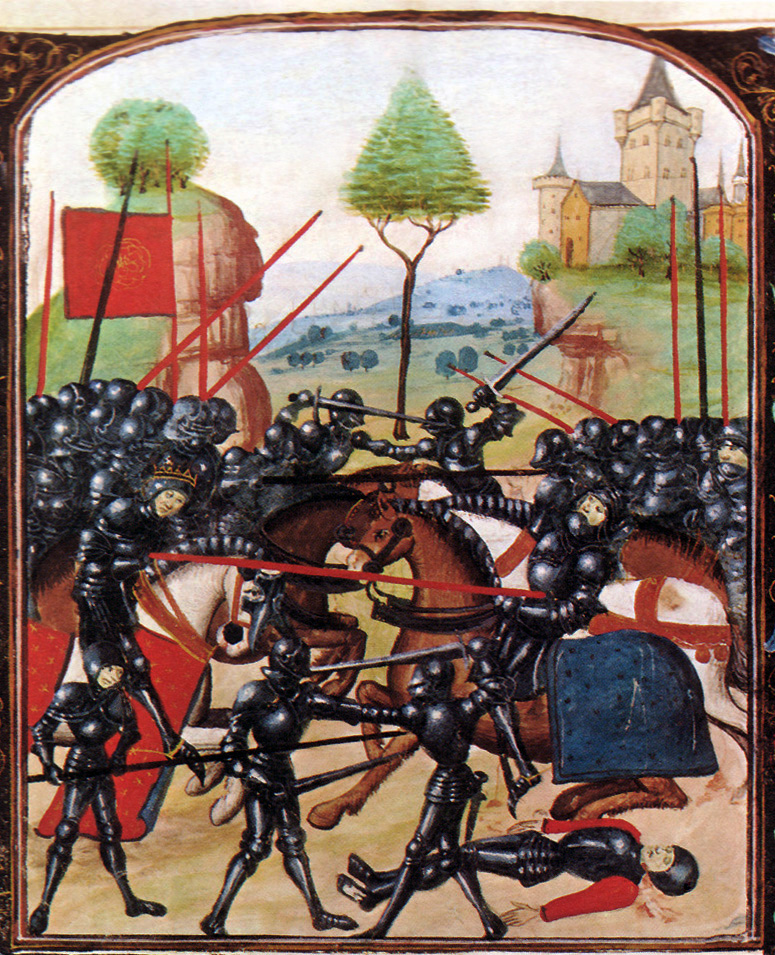
Warwick's rebellion ended with his death in the Battle of Barnet in 1471, here depicted in a late-15th-century manuscript illustration.

The royal army under Devon and Pembroke intercepted the northern rebels – on their way south to meet up with Warwick and Clarence – by Banbury in Oxfordshire. It is not clear what happened after this. According to Warkworth, Devon and Pembroke quarrelled over billeting arrangements, and Devon took off with the majority of the archers. The next day, on 24 July 1469, Pembroke met the rebels at the Battle of Edgcote, but without Devon's archers, he was thoroughly defeated. The French chronicler Jean de Waurin, however, gives a different account. According to Waurin, Devon left the field of battle once he heard the news that Clarence was arriving with reinforcements. In either case, Pembroke was captured and executed on Warwick's order. Devon managed to escape, but was later captured by a mob at Bridgwater in Somerset, and executed on 17 August.

Stafford had been Earl of Devon for exactly three months at the time of his death. He and Isabel had no children, so when he died his title became extinct. It was restored the next year for John Courtenay, the brother of Thomas, the last Courtenay earl of Devon. Stafford was buried in Glastonbury Abbey, and a dispute over his lands followed between his cousins.

Stafford was considered over-ambitious and unscrupulous by many contemporaries. This can be seen both by Warkworth implicating him in the downfall of Henry Courtenay, and Warwick targeting him as one of King Edward's evil councillors. This thread has also been picked up by modern historians; Charles Ross calls him a "greedy and ambitious man". At the same time, his skills as an administrator can hardly be doubted, as evidenced by King Edward's heavy reliance on him. He could also show a more human and sympathetic side. Michael Hicks describes his activity, from 1467 onwards, in adding codicils to his will "to right the wrongs that he was conscious of committing" – the last of these he added as he faced his own execution.

== Notes ==
a. He was listed as "ten years or more" at his father's death on 18 June 1450.

b. While it is possible that this Humphrey had a prosthetic hand made of, or plated in silver, it is more likely that he earned this moniker from a reputed generosity.

c. "Robin of Redesdale" was an alias; the rebellion was actually led by Warwick's northern retainers.

Peerage of England
New title	Earl of Devon; 2nd creation 1469	Extinct
New title	Baron Stafford of Southwick; 1st creation 1461	Extinct
