= Stephen Darby (disambiguation) =

Stephen Darby (born 1988) is an English footballer.

Stephen Darby or Steve Darby may also refer to:

- Steve Darby (born 1955), English football coach and player
- Stephen Darby, bass player in Little Women with Jerry Joseph
- Steve Darby, former chair of the British Society for Geomorphology
- Steve Darby, a character played by John Swasey on Walker, Texas Ranger

== See also ==
- Sir Stephen Derby (fl. 1360–1396), MP for Dorset
