= Humphrey Stafford (died 1450) =

English nobleman

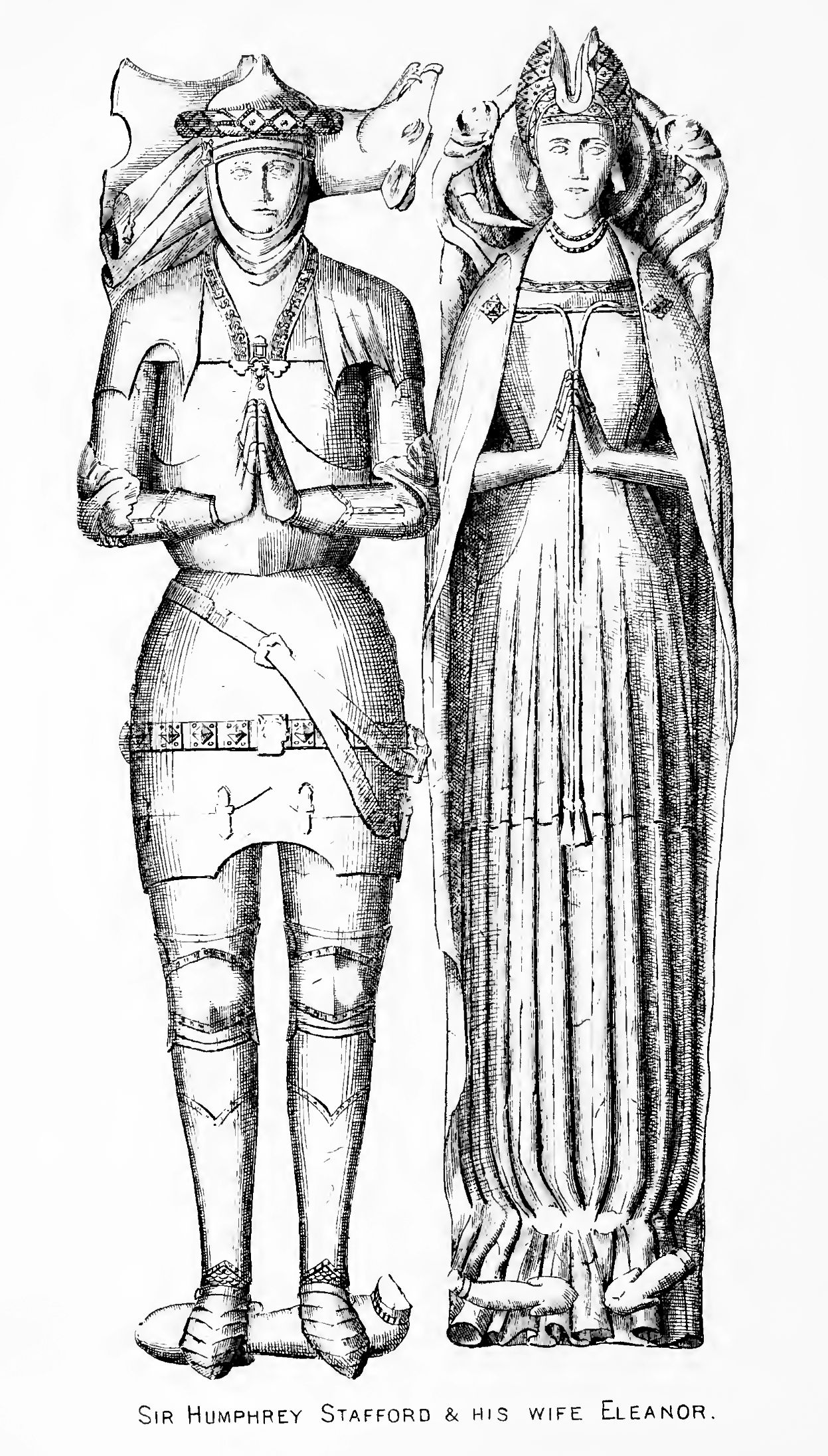
Monument with effigies to Sir Humphrey Stafford and his wife Eleanor Aylesbury, St John's Church, Bromsgrove

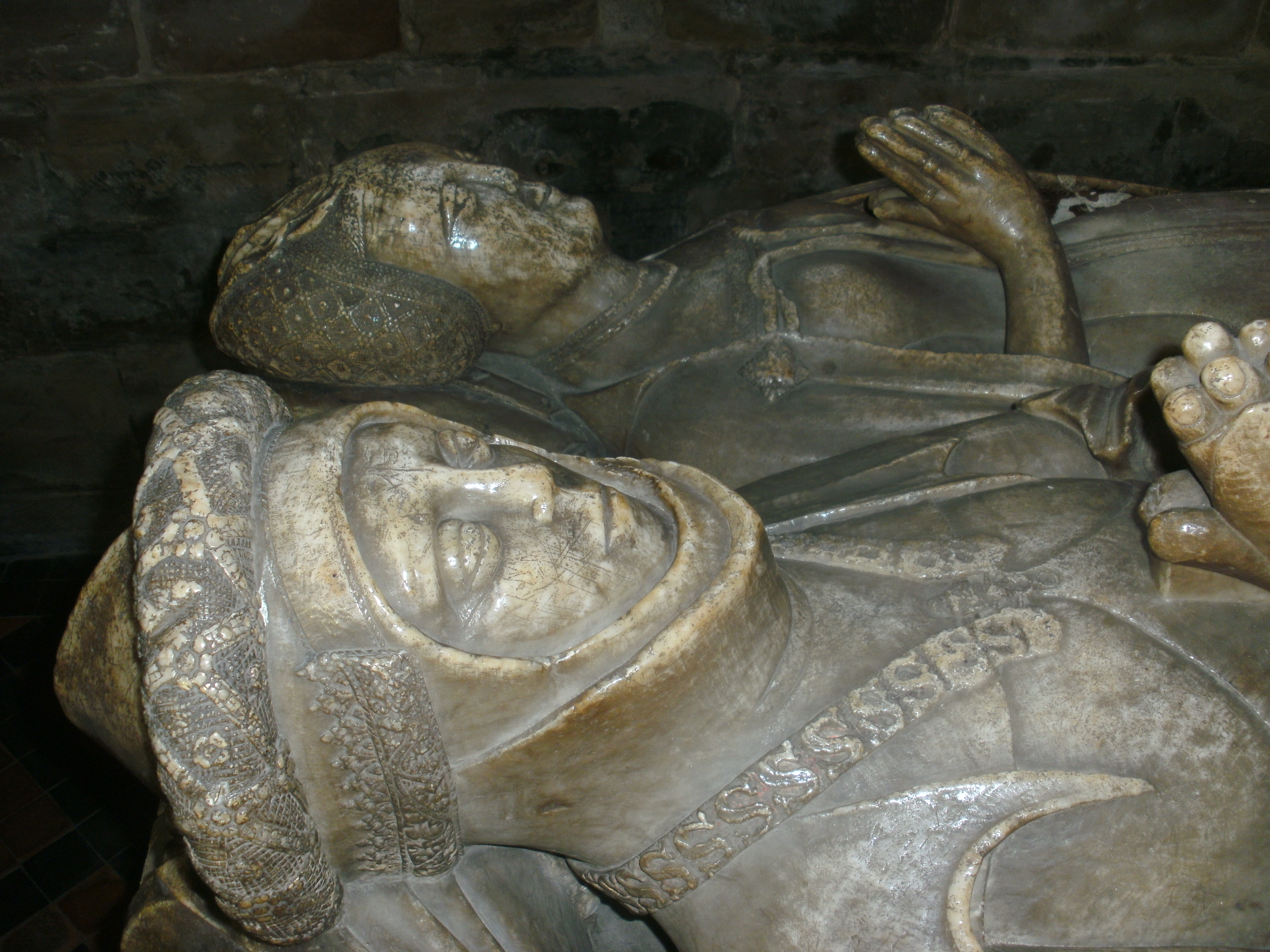
Detail from Sir Humphrey and his wife's monument in St John's Church

Sir Humphrey Stafford (died 1450), of Grafton in the parish of Bromsgrove, Worcestershire, was an English nobleman who served as Governor of Calais.

He was the second son and eventual heir of Sir Humphrey Stafford (1384-1419) of Grafton, a Member of the English Parliament in 1415, by his wife Elizabet Burdett. His elder brother was John Stafford (died 1422) of Grafton, whose heir he was.

He married Eleanor Aylesbury (died 1478), daughter and heiress of Thomas Aylesbury of Blatherwyke and Milton Keynes. By Eleanor he had the following known issue:

- Richard Stafford
- Sir Humphrey Stafford (c.1427-1486) of Grafton, son and heir, who took part in the War of the Roses on the Yorkist side and having fought for King Richard III at the Battle of Bosworth (1485), was executed by the victorious King Henry VII, following his role in the Stafford and Lovell rebellion.
- Thomas Stafford
- Ralph Stafford
- John Stafford
- Elizabeth Stafford, wife of Sir Richard Beauchamp, 2nd Baron Beauchamp.
- Anne Stafford, wife of Thomas Skulle & of Sir William Berkeley
- Joyce Stafford, wife of Sir Marmaduke Constable.

Stafford was killed on 7 June 1450 at Sevenoaks in Kent, during Jack Cade's Rebellion, together with his cousin William Stafford (died 1450) of Southwick, in the parish of North Bradley, Wiltshire. He was buried in the Church of St John the Baptist, Bromsgrove, where his monument survives, comprising recumbent alabaster effigies of himself and his wife, on a chest tomb.
