= Dorset (constituency) =

Former parliamentary constituency in the United Kingdom

- Former county constituency for the House of Commons
- Context of 1832-1868. Extract from 1837 result: the larger area with thick blue stripes.
- County: Dorset

1290–1885
- Seats: 1290–1832: Two; 1832–1885: Three
- Replaced by: North Dorset, South Dorset, East Dorset, West Dorset

Dorset was a county constituency covering Dorset in southern England, which elected two Members of Parliament (MPs), traditionally known as knights of the shire, to the House of Commons of England from 1290 until 1707, to the House of Commons of Great Britain from 1707 to 1800, and to the House of Commons of the United Kingdom until 1832.

The Great Reform Act increased its representation to three MPs with effect from the 1832 general election, and under the Redistribution of Seats Act 1885 the constituency was abolished for the 1885 election, and replaced by four single-member divisions: North Dorset, South Dorset, East Dorset and West Dorset.

When elections were contested, the bloc vote system was used, but contests were rare. Even after the 1832 Reforms, only three of the nineteen elections before 1885 were contested; in the others, the nominated candidates were returned without a vote.

== Members of Parliament ==
=== Before 1640 ===
Parliament	First member	Second member
1371	Sir John Hamely	
1376	Sir John Hamely	Sir Thomas Blount
1377 (Jan)	Sir John Hamely	
1386	Sir Stephen Derby	John Frome
1388 (Feb)	Sir Robert Turberville	John Frome
1388 (Sep)	Sir Humphrey Stafford	Sir John Moigne
1390 (Jan)	Sir Humphrey Stafford	John Frome
1390 (Nov)	Sir Stephen Derby	Theobald Wykeham
1391	Sir Humphrey Stafford	Sir John Hamely
1393	Sir Humphrey Stafford	Sir John Moigne
1394	Sir Stephen Derby	John Perle
1395	Sir Humphrey Stafford	Theobald Wykeham
1397 (Jan)	Sir Humphrey Stafford	Sir John Moigne
1397 (Sep)	John Bathe	William Martin
1399	Sir Humphrey Stafford	John Frome
1401	Sir Humphrey Stafford	John Frome
1402	Sir William Cheyne	John Bathe
1404 (Jan)	Sir Humphrey Stafford	John Frome
1404 (Oct)	Sir John Devereux	John Frampton
1406	Sir Humphrey Stafford	Sir Ivo Fitzwaryn
1407	Sir Humphrey Stafford	Sir Ivo Fitzwaryn
1410	Sir Humphrey Stafford	William Stourton
1411		
1413 (Feb)		
1413 (May)	Thomas Brooke	William Stourton
1414 (Apr)	Sir Humphrey Stafford II	William Filoll
1414 (Nov)	Sir Humphrey Stafford II	John Chideock
1415		
1416 (Mar)		
1416 (Oct)		
1417	Sir Humphrey Stafford II	Robert More
1419	Sir Humphrey Stafford II	Ralph Bush
1420	Sir Humphrey Stafford II	William Carent
1421 (May)	Sir Humphrey Stafford II	Robert Lovell
1421 (Dec)	Sir John Horsey	John Roger
1426	William Carent	
1427	William Carent	
1431	John Hody	
1439	William Browning (born 1400)	
1450	William Browning (born 1400)	
1455	William Browning (born 1400)	
1510–1523	No names known	
1529	Sir Giles Strangways I	John Horsey
1536	?	
1539	Sir Giles Strangways I	Sir John Horsey
1542	?	
1545	Sir Thomas Arundell	Sir John Rogers
1547	Sir Thomas Arundell	Sir John Rogers
1553 (Mar)	?	
1553 (Oct)	Sir John Horsey	Sir Giles Strangeways
Parliament of 1554	John Leweston	Sir Giles Strangeways
Parliament of 1554-1555	Sir Henry Ashley	Richard Phelips
Parliament of 1555	Sir John Rogers	Sir Giles Strangeways
Parliament of 1558	Sir Oliver Laurence	Sir Giles Strangeways
Parliament of 1559	Sir John Rogers	Sir Giles Strangeways
Parliament of 1563-1567	Sir Henry Ashley	Thomas Howard
Parliament of 1571	John Horsey	Sir William Paulet
Parliament of 1572-1581	Richard Rogers	John Strode
Parliament of 1584-1585	George Trenchard	John Fitzjames
Parliament of 1586-1587	Ralph Horsey	Andrew Rogers
Parliament of 1588-1589	Sir John Wolley	Andrew Rogers
Parliament of 1593	Thomas Hussey	Arthur Gorges
Parliament of 1597-1598	Sir Ralph Horsey	Sir Walter Raleigh
Parliament of 1601	George Trenchard	Sir Edmund Uvedall
Parliament of 1604-1611	Sir Thomas Freke	John Williams
Addled Parliament (1614)	Sir Mervyn Audley	Sir John Strangways
Parliament of 1621-1622	Sir Thomas Trenchard	Sir John Strangways
Happy Parliament (1624-1625)	Sir George Horsey	Sir John Strangways
Useless Parliament (1625)	Sir Walter Erle	Sir Nathaniel Napier
Parliament of 1625-1626	Sir George Morton	Sir Thomas Freke
Parliament of 1628-1629	Sir George Hussey	Sir John Strangways
No Parliament summoned 1629-1640

=== MPs 1640–1832 ===
Year	First member	First party	Second member	Second party
April 1640	Lord Digby	Royalist	Richard Rogers	Royalist
November 1640	Lord Digby	Royalist	Richard Rogers	Royalist
1641	John Browne	Parliamentarian	Richard Rogers	Royalist
September 1642	John Browne	Parliamentarian	Rogers disabled from sitting - seat vacant	
1645	John Browne	Parliamentarian	Sir Thomas Trenchard	
December 1648	John Browne	Parliamentarian	Trenchard did not sit after Pride's Purge - seat vacant	
1653	William Sydenham		John Bingham	
Dorset had six seats in the First and Second Parliaments of the Protectorate
1654	William Sydenham, John Bingham, Sir Walter Earle, John Fitzjames, John Trenchard, Henry Henley			
1656	William Sydenham, John Bingham, Robert Coker, John Fitzjames, John Trenchard, James Dewey			
Dorset reverted to two seats in the Third Protectorate Parliament
January 1659	Sir Walter Earle		John Bingham	
May 1659	Not represented in the restored Rump			
April 1660	John Fitzjames		Robert Coker	
Apr 1661	John Strode		Giles Strangways	
1675	John Strode		Lord Digby	
1677	John Strode		Thomas Browne	
1679	Thomas Strangways I		Thomas Freke	
1701	Thomas Strangways I		Thomas Trenchard	
1702	Thomas Strangways I		Thomas Chafin	
1711	Thomas Strangways I		Richard Bingham	
1713	George Chafin		Thomas Strangways II	
Jan 1727	George Chafin		George Pitt	
Sep 1727	George Chafin		Edmund Morton Pleydell	
1747	George Chafin		George Pitt	Tory later Independent
1754	Humphrey Sturt		George Pitt	Tory later Independent
1774	Humphrey Sturt		Hon. George Pitt	
1784	Francis John Browne		Hon. George Pitt	
1790	Francis John Browne		William Morton Pitt	Tory
1806	Edward Berkeley Portman I	Whig	William Morton Pitt	Tory
1823	Edward Portman II	Whig	William Morton Pitt	Tory
1826	Edward Portman II	Whig	Henry Bankes	Tory
May. 1831	Edward Portman II	Whig	John Calcraft	Whig
Sep. 1831	Edward Portman II	Whig	Lord Ashley	Tory
1832	Representation increased to 3 members			

=== MPs 1832–1885 ===
Election	First member	First party	Second member	Second party	Third member	Third party
1832	Lord Ashley	Tory	William John Bankes	Tory	Hon. William Ponsonby	Whig
1834	Lord Ashley	Conservative	William John Bankes	Conservative	Hon. William Ponsonby	Whig
1835	Lord Ashley	Conservative	Henry Sturt	Conservative	Hon. William Ponsonby	Whig
1837	Lord Ashley	Conservative	Henry Sturt	Conservative	Hon. John Fox-Strangways	Whig
1841	Lord Ashley	Conservative	Henry Sturt	Conservative	George Bankes	Conservative
1846 by-election	Henry Ker Seymer	Conservative	John Floyer	Conservative	George Bankes	Conservative
1856 by-election	Henry Ker Seymer	Conservative	John Floyer	Conservative	Henry Sturt	Conservative
1857	Henry Ker Seymer	Conservative	Hon. Henry Portman	Whig	Henry Sturt	Conservative
1859	Henry Ker Seymer	Conservative	Hon. Henry Portman	Liberal	Henry Sturt	Conservative
1864 by-election	John Floyer	Conservative	Hon. Henry Portman	Liberal	Henry Sturt	Conservative
1876 by-election	John Floyer	Conservative	Hon. Henry Portman	Liberal	Hon. Edward Digby	Conservative
1885	Constituency divided among North, South, East, and West Dorset.					

== Election results ==
=== Elections in the 1830s ===
General election 1830: Dorset
Party	Candidate	Votes	%
Whig	Edward Portman	Unopposed	
Tory	Henry Bankes	Unopposed	
Registered electors		c. 3,500	
Whig hold			
Tory hold			

General election 1831: Dorset
Party	Candidate	Votes	%
Whig	Edward Portman	1,699	39.3
Whig	John Calcraft	1,452	33.6
Tory	Henry Bankes	1,170	27.1
Majority		282	6.5
Turnout		c. 2,161	c. 54.0
Registered electors		c. 4,000	
Whig hold			
Whig gain from Tory			

Calcraft's death caused a by-election.

By-election, 30 September 1831: Dorset
Party	Candidate	Votes	%	±%
Tory	Anthony Ashley-Cooper	1,847	50.5	+23.4
Whig	William Ponsonby	1,811	49.5	−23.4
Majority		36	1.0	N/A
Turnout		3,658	c. 91.5	c. +37.5
Registered electors		c. 4,000		
Tory gain from Whig		Swing	+23.4	

General election 1832: Dorset
Party	Candidate	Votes	%
Tory	Anthony Ashley-Cooper	Unopposed	
Tory	William John Bankes	Unopposed	
Whig	William Ponsonby	Unopposed	
Registered electors		5,632	
Tory win (new seat)			
Tory gain from Whig			
Whig hold			

General election 1835: Dorset
Party	Candidate	Votes	%
Conservative	Anthony Ashley-Cooper	Unopposed	
Conservative	Henry Sturt	Unopposed	
Whig	William Ponsonby	Unopposed	
Registered electors		5,679	
Conservative hold			
Conservative hold			
Whig hold			

General election 1837: Dorset
Party	Candidate	Votes	%
Conservative	Anthony Ashley-Cooper	Unopposed	
Conservative	Henry Sturt	Unopposed	
Whig	John Fox-Strangways	Unopposed	
Registered electors		6,263	
Conservative hold			
Conservative hold			
Whig hold			

=== Elections in the 1840s ===
General election 1841: Dorset
Party	Candidate	Votes	%	±%
Conservative	Anthony Ashley-Cooper	Unopposed		
Conservative	Henry Sturt	Unopposed		
Conservative	George Bankes	Unopposed		
Registered electors		6,870		
Conservative hold				
Conservative hold				
Conservative gain from Whig				

Ashley-Cooper and Sturt both resigned by accepting the office of Steward of the Chiltern Hundreds causing a by-election.

By-election, 19 February 1846: Dorset
Party	Candidate	Votes	%	±%
Conservative	John Floyer	Unopposed		
Conservative	Henry Ker Seymer	Unopposed		
Conservative hold				
Conservative hold				

General election 1847: Dorset
Party	Candidate	Votes	%	±%
Conservative	George Bankes	Unopposed		
Conservative	John Floyer	Unopposed		
Conservative	Henry Ker Seymer	Unopposed		
Registered electors		6,275		
Conservative hold				
Conservative hold				
Conservative hold				

=== Elections in the 1850s ===
Bankes was appointed Judge Advocate General of the Armed Forces, requiring a by-election.

By-election, 9 March 1852: Dorset
Party	Candidate	Votes	%	±%
Conservative	George Bankes	Unopposed		
Conservative hold				

General election 1852: Dorset
Party	Candidate	Votes	%	±%
Conservative	George Bankes	Unopposed		
Conservative	John Floyer	Unopposed		
Conservative	Henry Ker Seymer	Unopposed		
Registered electors		5,690		
Conservative hold				
Conservative hold				
Conservative hold				

Bankes' death caused a by-election.

By-election, 26 July 1856: Dorset
Party	Candidate	Votes	%	±%
Conservative	Henry Sturt	Unopposed		
Conservative hold				

General election 1857: Dorset
Party	Candidate	Votes	%	±%
Whig	Henry Portman	2,430	27.1	New
Conservative	Henry Sturt	2,197	24.5	N/A
Conservative	Henry Ker Seymer	2,177	24.3	N/A
Conservative	John Floyer	2,159	24.1	N/A
Majority		271	3.0	N/A
Turnout		4,608 (est)	82.0 (est)	N/A
Registered electors		6,203		
Whig gain from Conservative		Swing	N/A	
Conservative hold		Swing	N/A	
Conservative hold		Swing	N/A	

General election 1859: Dorset
Party	Candidate	Votes	%	±%
Conservative	Henry Sturt	Unopposed		
Conservative	Henry Ker Seymer	Unopposed		
Liberal	Henry Portman	Unopposed		
Registered electors		6,639		
Conservative hold				
Conservative hold				
Liberal hold				

=== Elections in the 1860s ===
Seymer resigned, causing a by-election.

By-election, 27 February 1864: Dorset
Party	Candidate	Votes	%	±%
Conservative	John Floyer	Unopposed		
Conservative hold				

General election 1865: Dorset
Party	Candidate	Votes	%	±%
Conservative	Henry Sturt	Unopposed		
Conservative	John Floyer	Unopposed		
Liberal	Henry Portman	Unopposed		
Registered electors		6,203		
Conservative hold				
Conservative hold				
Liberal hold				

General election 1868: Dorset
Party	Candidate	Votes	%	±%
Conservative	Henry Sturt	Unopposed		
Conservative	John Floyer	Unopposed		
Liberal	Henry Portman	Unopposed		
Registered electors		7,443		
Conservative hold				
Conservative hold				
Liberal hold				

=== Elections in the 1870s ===
General election 1874: Dorset
Party	Candidate	Votes	%	±%
Conservative	Henry Sturt	Unopposed		
Conservative	John Floyer	Unopposed		
Liberal	Henry Portman	Unopposed		
Registered electors		7,293		
Conservative hold				
Conservative hold				
Liberal hold				

Sturt was elevated to the peerage, becoming Lord Alington.

By-election, 5 Feb 1876: Dorset
Party	Candidate	Votes	%	±%
Conservative	Edward Digby	3,060	62.1	N/A
Tenant Farmer	Robert Fowler	1,866	37.9	New
Majority		1,194	24.2	N/A
Turnout		4,926	69.0	N/A
Registered electors		7,142		
Conservative hold				

=== Elections in the 1880s ===
General election 1880: Dorset
Party	Candidate	Votes	%	±%
Conservative	Edward Digby	Unopposed		
Conservative	John Floyer	Unopposed		
Liberal	Henry Portman	Unopposed		
Registered electors		7,522		
Conservative hold				
Conservative hold				
Liberal hold				
