= John Williams (Dorset MP) =

English politician

Member of Parliament for Dorset
- In office 1604–1611 Serving with Thomas Freke
- Preceded by: Edmund Uvedale
- Succeeded by: John Strangways

Personal details
- Born: 1545
- Died: 7 September 1617 (aged 71–72)
- Resting place: St Peter's Church, Dorchester

John Williams (c. 1545 – 7 September 1617) was an English politician who was member of parliament (MP) for Dorset.
