= Ralph Stafford =

Ralph Stafford may refer to:

- Ralph Stafford, 1st Earl of Stafford (1301–1372), English nobleman and soldier
- Ralph Stafford (died 1385) (c. 1367–1385), eldest son of the 2nd Earl of Stafford, knight of the royal household of King Richard II of England
- Ralph Stafford (died 1410) (c. 1355–1410), English MP for Staffordshire, 1404 and Worcestershire, 1383, 1401
