= Southwick Court =

Medieval manor house

Coordinates: 51°18′04″N 2°13′25″W

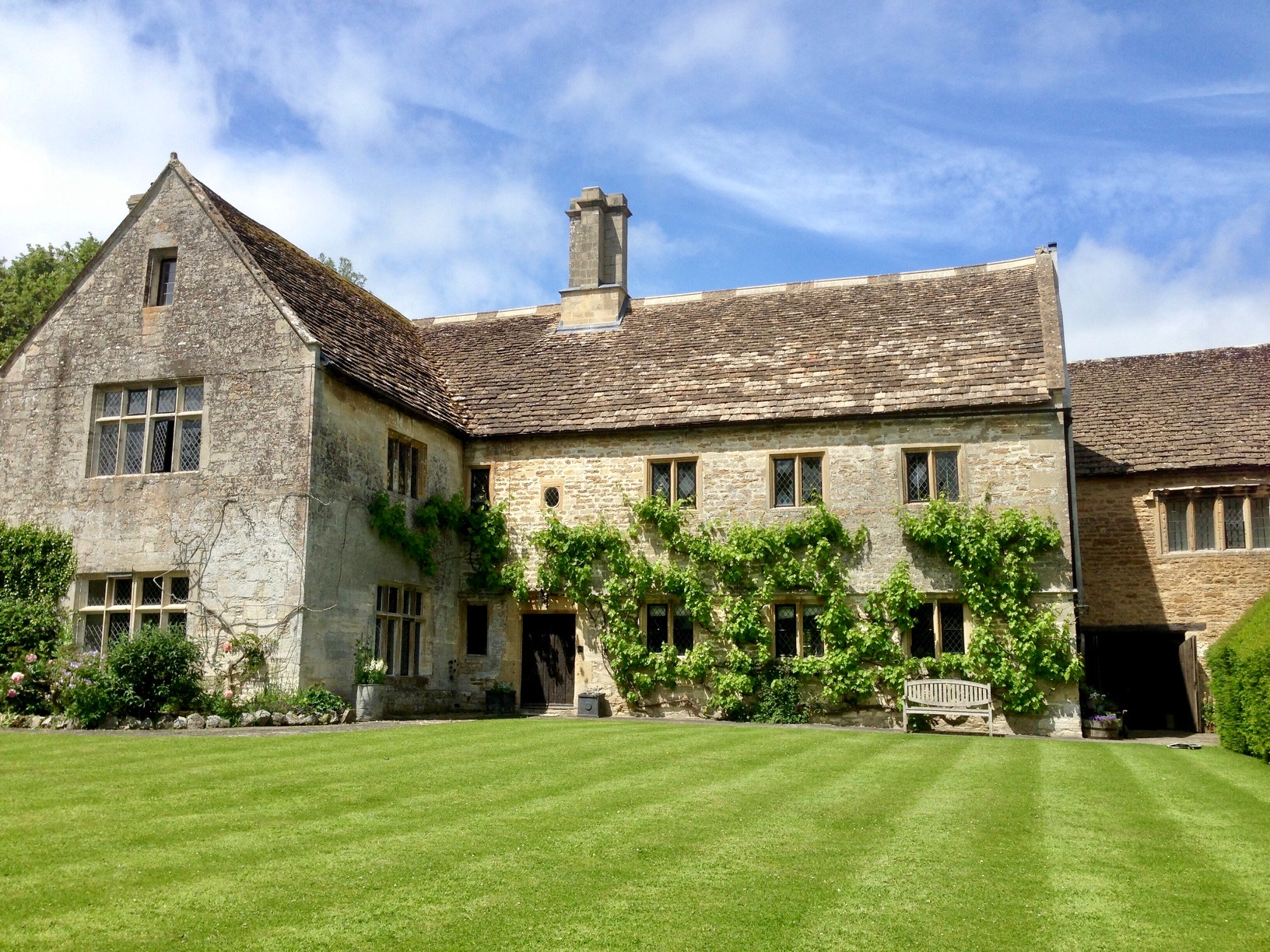
The 16th-century Grade II* listed Southwick Court manor house

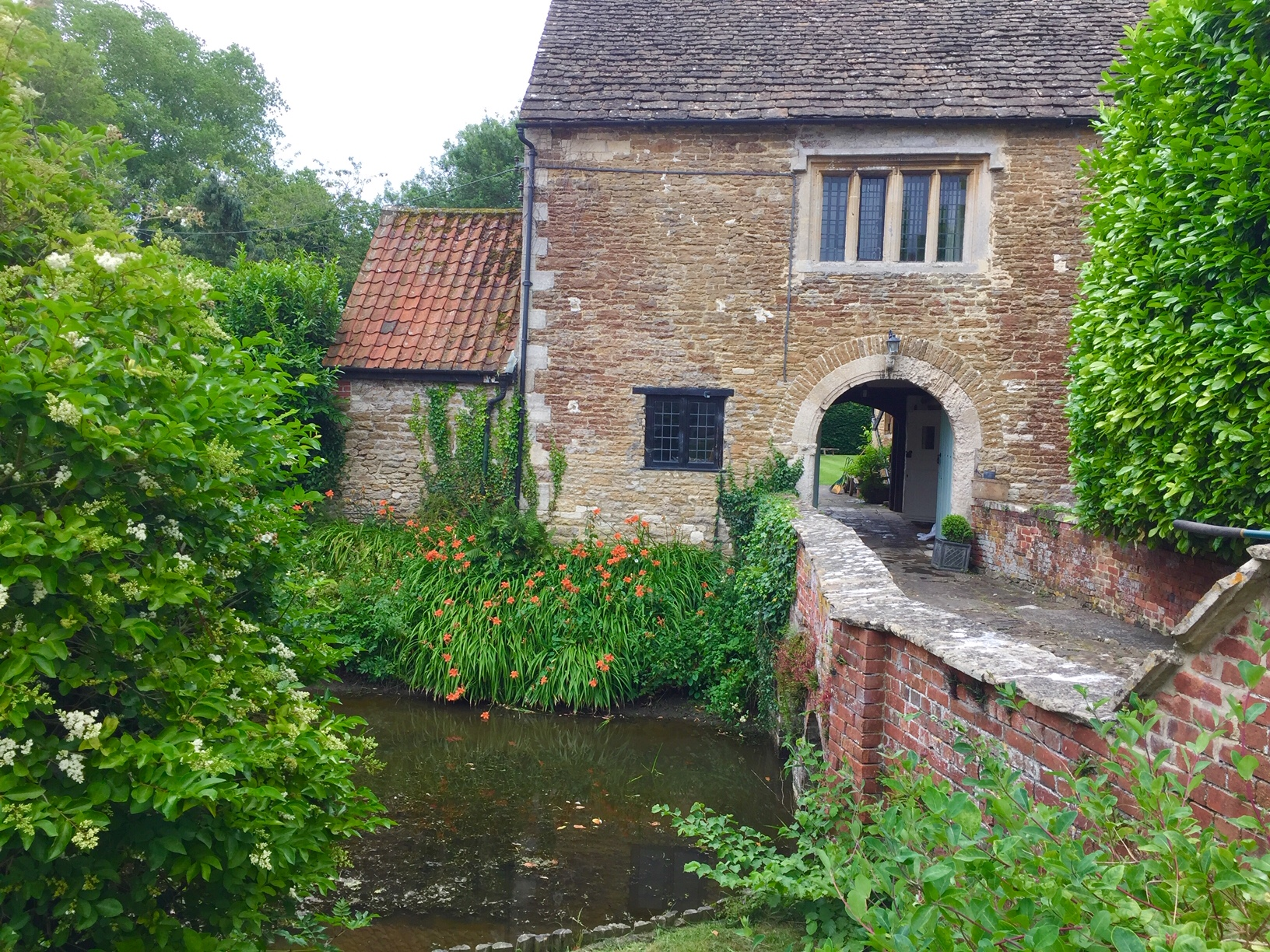
The 15th-century Grade II* listed gatehouse at Southwick Court

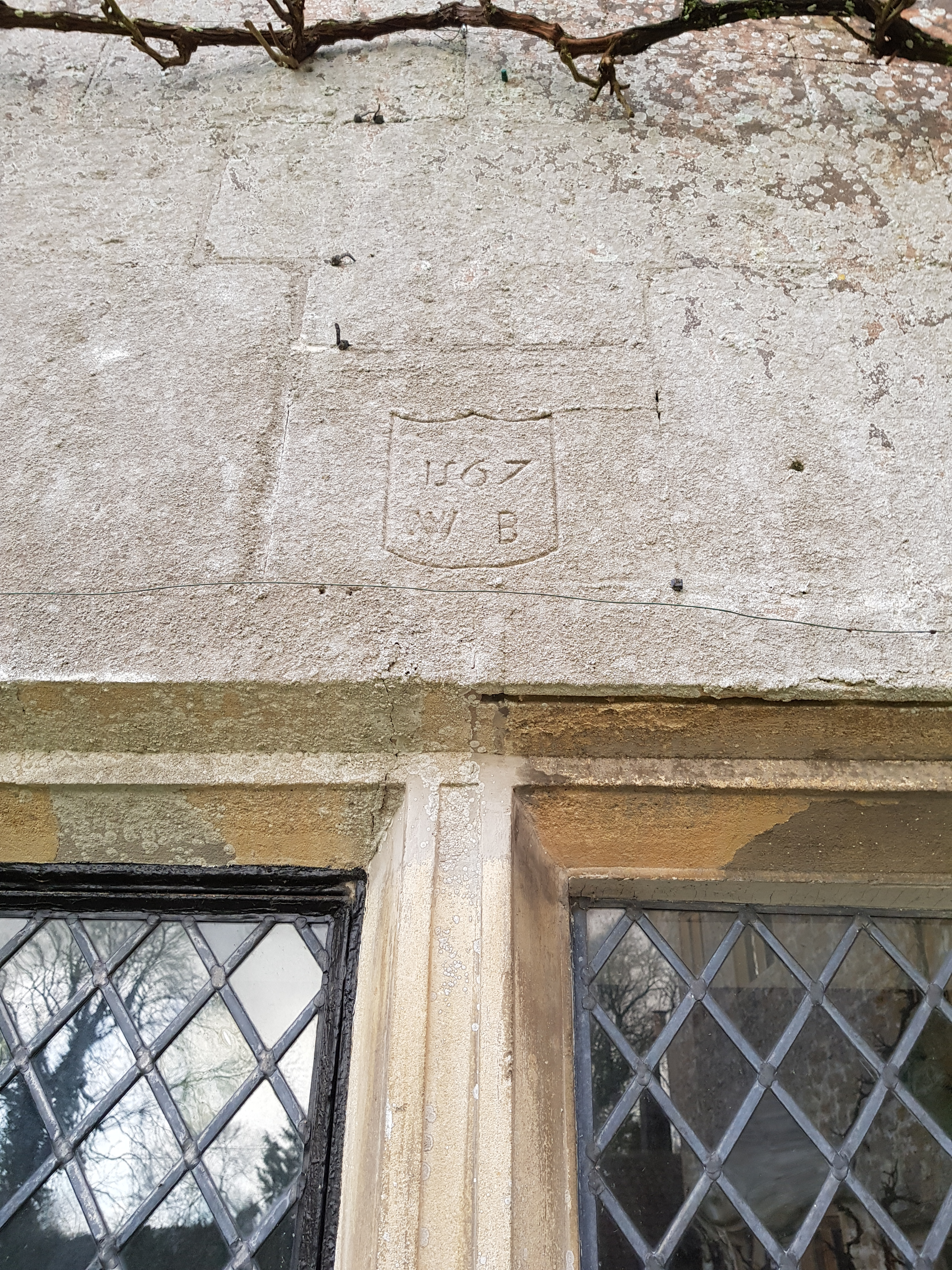
Initials carved by Walter Bush on the wing of Southwick Court following completion of building works in 1567

Remnants of the drain and carrier channels most probably cut in the late 16th or 17th century to convert arable land to the immediate northwest of Southwick Court into water meadows

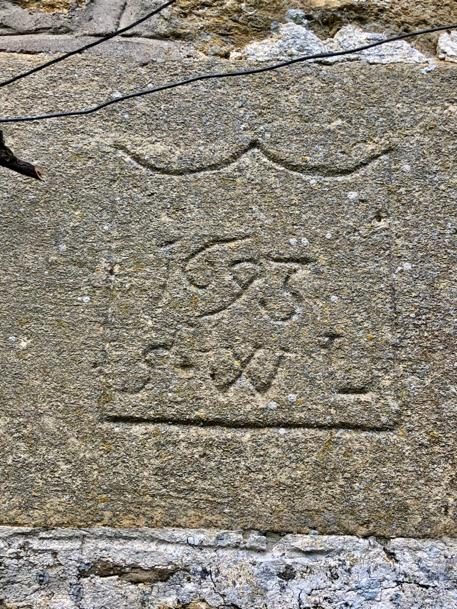
Initials carved for Sir Walter Long on the exterior of Southwick Court following completion of building works in 1693

Engraving from Aubrey's 17th Century Topographical Survey of Wiltshire, illustrating the arms of the families associated with Southwick Court and a sketch of the house

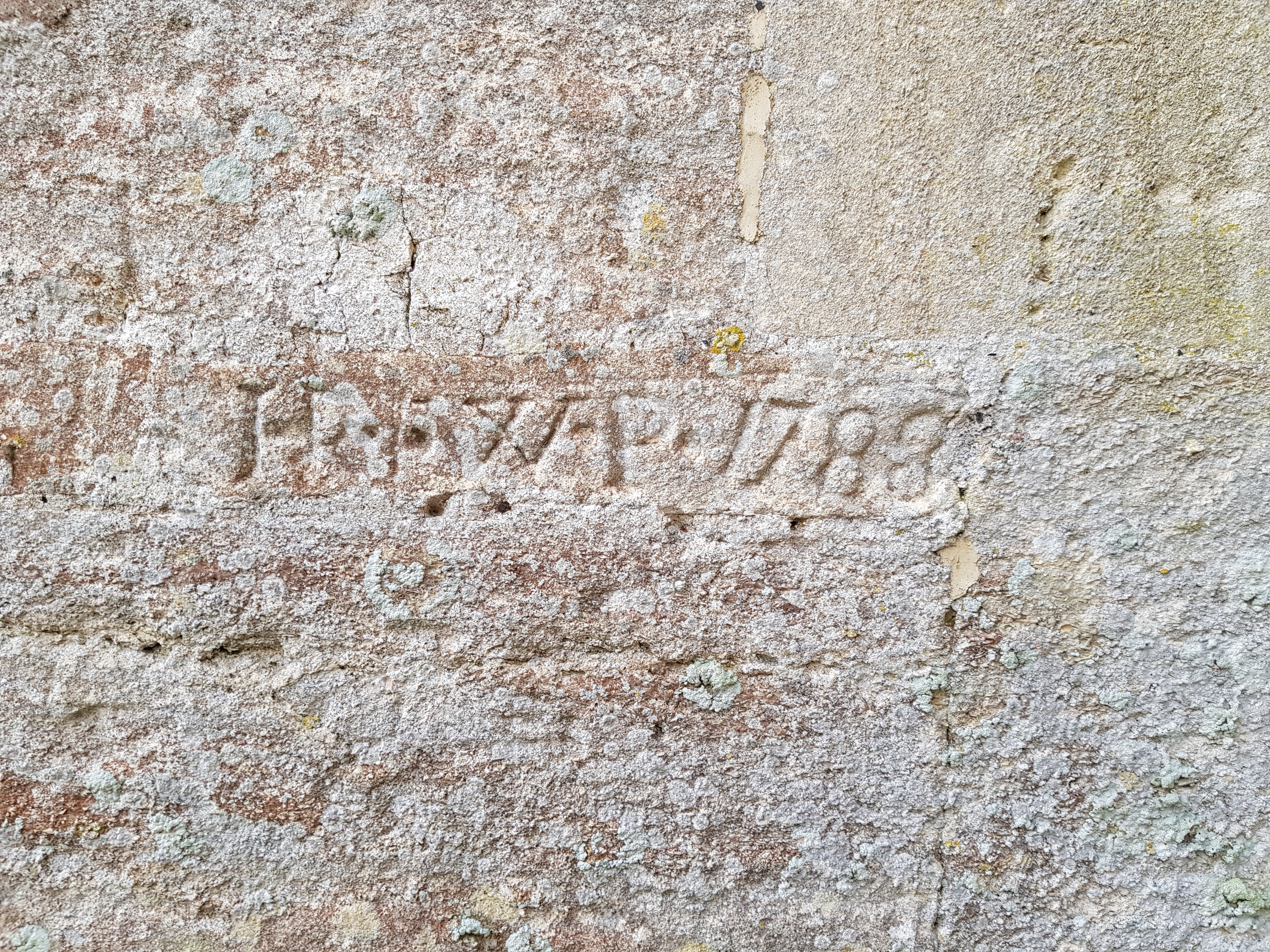
Engraved initials dating from alterations of 1788. Are those the initials H.?.W.P?

Southwick Court is a Grade II* listed moated medieval manor house at the centre of a system of fields and water meadows that lie between the town of Trowbridge and the village of Southwick in Wiltshire, England. It has remained a private residence under a succession of owners for at least 800 years. The current house dates from the late 16th century, but its gatehouse is late 15th century. Both were built on the site of an older manor house, dating back to the 13th century or before. Nothing remains of the original house, though the current building sits within the same footprint.

== Description ==
The house is arranged in an L-plan that is typical of the late 16th century. It and its associated garden and orchard are surrounded by a moat, which is fed by a leg of the Lambrok stream originating some distance away to the west of the village of Beckington. This stream surrounds the house and in turn feeds into an adjoining lake, which is enclosed at the northern end by a weir, also dating from the 15th or 16th century. The stream continues beyond the weir into the surrounding water meadows, and then on into Trowbridge where it joins the River Biss.

Internally, the house retains many of its original late 16th and early 17th century interiors, and displays craftsmanship of a high standard. The house has a number of intricate timber features including a late 17th-century carved staircase, framing and Tudor-arched stone fireplaces. Remnants of its origins as a former hall house survive or are still visible, including what appears to be a bread oven in the wall between the two large fireplaces on the ground floor, and traces of a former garderobe (or privy) built into the external north-eastern wall and connected to the moat through a channel which is still visible. The house also retains several stained glass and leaded windows of various styles and ages. Several bear the symbol of the White Rose of York and may have been saved from the original pre-16th century manor house. Some glass may have been brought from Beckington Castle, a nearby property built in the 17th century by members of the Long family, who also owned Southwick Court for many years.

The gatehouse, which may be from the late 15th century, is approached by a small brick-built bridge over the moat which is probably 18th-century; the ensemble is Grade II* listed.

== History ==
=== Early history ===
The earliest record of a manor house of Southwick dates to 1274 when two carucates (about 240 acres) of land at Southwick, in what was then the parish of North Bradley, belonged to one William de Greynville. Twenty years later, in 1294, records show a legal agreement between the Rector of North Bradley and William's son Adam de Greynville who had built a private chapel in the grounds of his house Southwick Court, apparently dedicated to John the Baptist. The Rector of Bradley agreed to allow services to take place in this chapel, on the condition that only members of the Greynville family and "strangers arriving unexpectedly" could attend. The family was also required to provide the Rector "from time to time" with "fit chaplains" who would "do fealty to him". Later, in 1369, Robert Wyvil, Bishop of Salisbury, granted a license for mass to be said in the chapel.

According to a later report, the chapel was "about fortie foote distance from the moate which boundeth the Court of Southwick". Mass continued to be heard in the chapel until the mid 16th century. In the 1540s, one "Sir Hugh" was "a morrowe masse priest who used to say morning masse or service (for high masse he might not say) in the Chapell neare to the Manor house or Court of Southwick, and did them great pleasure and ease until hee ranne away, because he was found in a fault". He reportedly took sanctuary in North Bradley a little "before the King went to Bullen" – a reference to Henry VIII's siege of Boulogne in 1544. "After this no other priest said masse in the Chapell".

The chapel fell into disuse and was later reportedly used as a stable or cowshed before being demolished in 1839. However, building material from this period has been found within the moated complex, including 13th century freestone pillar bases and moulded freestone arches, and it has been suggested that some of the timber framing from the earlier manor house has been integrated into the structure of the existing Southwick Court.

The house remained within the Greynville or Grenville family for several generations. According to surviving documents, it was occupied by several members of the family including William de Grenville and his wife Lucy in 1322, Nicholas de Grenville in 1332, and latterly John de Grenville and his wife Margaret from 1338. In 1341, John de Grenville's daughter Alice married the first Sir Humphrey Stafford, later sheriff of Dorset and Somerset under Henry IV. Upon John's death in around 1349, Sir Humphrey acquired the house and land, and he and his wife lived at Southwick Court for the next several years.

In 1354, Lady Alice Stafford suffered "a very unpleasant experience when several scoundrels which included J Talbot of Torbrigge [Trowbridge], J Tourney of Woolverton and Robert Torney of La Boxe broke the close at Southwick and abducted her, at the same time seriously injuring the servants and removing much of her father's goods."

After Alice's death, Sir Humphrey married again – to Elizabeth (née d’Aumarle) widow of Sir John Maltravers – and he moved from Southwick Court to settle in his new wife's dower house at Hook in Dorset. His sole son and heir, from his first marriage to Alice, was also Sir Humphrey Stafford. The elder Humphrey also fathered another son out of wedlock, in around 1380–1390. This was John Stafford, who went on to achieve considerable prominence in later life as a trusted adviser and supporter of both Henry V and Henry VI, latterly as Lord Chancellor from 1432 to 1450, and as Archbishop of Canterbury from 1443 until his death in 1452. His mother was one Emma (her surname is unknown) from nearby North Bradley, possibly a servant or a lady-in-waiting at Southwick Court. Though probably of humble birth herself, John Stafford arranged for her to be entombed after her death in 1446 in a specially constructed chapel within North Bradley parish church. Her tomb, though worn, still stands. Stafford himself is buried in Canterbury Cathedral.

=== 15th century ===
The younger Sir Humphrey Stafford became the owner of Southwick Court upon his father's death in 1413 until his own demise in 1442. In his lifetime he earned the nickname of Sir Humphrey Stafford "with the Silver Hand", probably "a figurative compliment to his liberality". He married his step-sister Elizabeth Maltravers, second daughter of Sir John Maltravers by his stepmother Elizabeth.

They had three sons – Richard, John and William – and a daughter, Alice. However, the two elder boys both died before their father, leaving William as the owner of Southwick Court after his father's death in 1442. In 1450, William joined Henry VI's service to fight the insurgents of Jack Cade's Rebellion, but killed in battle at Sevenoaks in Kent. (His sister Alice was by now married to Sir Edmund Cheyne, member of Parliament for Wiltshire, who lived in another important local house at Brook near Westbury).

Over the following decades, Southwick Court was to become a pawn in the struggle for supremacy between the House of York and the House of Lancaster during the Wars of the Roses. Though John Stafford had been aligned with the House of Lancaster as a senior adviser to Henry VI, the main branch of the Stafford family were firm Yorkists.

Through his marriage to Katherine, daughter of Sir John Chidiock, William Stafford left an only son, another Humphrey, born 1439, who was created Baron Stafford of Southwick in 1461 by the newly crowned Edward IV, the first Yorkist King. After armed conflict broke out between the two sides, Edward appointed Humphrey Earl of Devon and sent him north to quell a Lancastrian rebellion led by the Earl of Warwick. However, the King's forces were defeated, partly as a result of a foolhardy fit of romantic pique on Humphrey's part.

Humphrey Stafford "was given command of 800 archers and ordered to report to the Earl of Pembroke in command of 7,000 Welshmen about to join battle with a large force of Lancastrians in the neighbourhood of Banbury. Near-by was an inn well known to both officers, as was the charm and beauty of a certain lady who dwelt therein. Presuming on his seniority the Earl of Pembroke claimed the billet, upon which Stafford marched his men back to Somerset. Soon after their departure, the Lancastrians attacked, 5,000 Welshmen were massacred, Lord Pembroke and his brother Sir Richard Herbert taken prisoner and beheaded. Subsequently by order of the King, Stafford Earl of Devon was arrested and beheaded at Bridgwater on August 17th 1469."

Humphrey Stafford of Southwick and Devon left behind two daughters, both of whom died unmarried. As a result, Southwick Court passed to his cousin Anne Cheyne, the daughter of Sir Edmund Cheyne and his aunt Alice. Anne was married to Sir John Willoughby of the house of Willoughby of Eresby. Though Sir John Willoughby was killed in the Battle of Tewkesbury in 1471, the house remained in the family. Sir John's eldest son was Sir Robert Willoughby, and along with many others among Wiltshire's gentry, he joined with the Duke of Buckingham to resist Richard III. As a result, Willoughby's lands were seized by the King, and Southwick Court (and also Brook) were bestowed upon Richard's favourite, Edward Ratcliffe, in 1483.

That change of ownership was to prove only temporary and two years later, Southwick Court was restored to the Willoughby family following Richard's defeat at the Battle of Bosworth. Sir Robert was ennobled by the new king Henry VII as Lord Willoughby de Brooke and appointed as Steward of the Royal Household.

=== 16th century ===
The Willoughby family based themselves not at Southwick Court but at Brook, and in 1520, Sir Robert's son, also Robert, and the second Lord Willoughby de Brooke, sold the house. The buyer was Sir David Owen, the illegitimate son of Owen Tudor (and great-uncle of the future Henry VIII), who had been knighted by Henry VII for services rendered during the later Wars of the Roses. Owen was a notable figure in his own right despite his illegitimate status. A close confidant of Henry VII, he was the king's carver between 1486 and 1529, and was one of Henry VII's chief mourners upon the monarch's death in 1509. Yet Southwick Court was merely an investment for Owen. Henry VII had also brokered Owen's marriage to the heiress Mary de Bohun of Midhurst, who brought with her the Cowdray estate in Sussex, and it was this that became Sir David's principal residence.

Under the descendants of Sir David Owen, the ownership of Southwick Court seems to have become divided. One of his sons, Sir Henry Owen, sold a portion of the estate to Sir Wolstan Dixie, Lord Mayor of London, who in turn left his share to Christ's Hospital. Another portion was sold in 1556 by John Owen to Christopher Bayley of Stowford, from a family of wealthy clothiers in Trowbridge, who already had extensive property interests in the area (including the manor of Priston in Somerset). Christopher Bayley married Maud, daughter of another wealthy local clothier Thomas Horton of Iford. Maud Horton had herself already separately inherited a one-third ownership of Southwick Manor.

Following Christopher Bayley's death in around 1560, Maud remarried Walter Bush of Dilton near Westbury. It is at this point that the house as it exists today was created. It is not clear in exactly what form the house existed before this point, but Walter Bush commissioned extensive alterations which included the addition of the L-shaped wing at the rear of the house. He left his mark in the form of his elegantly engraved initials and the date 1567 on a stone set into the new wing.

It is quite likely that the surrounding fields were developed as water meadows at around the same time. The manorial system had begun to break down across Britain at the end of the 16th century, and this led to the enclosure of land and a rapid expansion of sheep farming across Wiltshire. The remains of the "drain" and "carrier" channels dug in this period to irrigate the pastures with water from the Lambrok stream are still clearly visible in the fields surrounding Southwick Court.

=== 17th century ===
Walter Bush lived at Southwick Court for the rest of his life. Upon his death in around 1595, his will made provision for his widow Maud to remain in the house for the rest of her life. After her death in around 1601, a legal dispute ensued. In law, the house reverted to the family of Maud's first husband, Christopher Bayley. However, Bush's son, also Walter Bush, brought suit against the Bayleys, claiming that his father had granted him and his two brothers occupation of Southwick Court for life. However, this case appears to have collapsed, and the Bush family were ejected by Christopher Bayley's granddaughter Rebecca who some years earlier had married Henry Long of Whaddon. This brought ownership of Southwick Court into the Long family, where it was to remain for the next 300 years. This branch of the Long family had been established in the local cloth trade since the late 15th century, and like the Bayley and Horton families - to whom there were already several family ties - they had grown extremely wealthy and influential. Henry and Rebecca Long lived at Southwick Court from 1596 until 1608, when Henry inherited his family's estate at Whaddon. As a result, for the next several years, Southwick Court was leased to Long's cousin John Yerbury of Atworth. When John Yerbury died in 1614, the lease passed to his elder son William Yerbury, and later to younger son John Yerbury (junior). However, the younger John was declared a lunatic in 1625 and the lease appears to have been surrendered.

In the meantime, ownership of the house remained with the Long family. Following Henry Long's death in 1612, Rebecca married again to Henry Sherfield, Recorder of Salisbury and Member of Parliament for that city 1623–28. A Puritan, Sherfield was later tried in the Star Chamber and heavily fined for having broken and defaced a stained glass window in the Church of St Edmund in Salisbury.

Upon Sherfield's death in 1634, the house reverted to Walter Long of Whaddon, Rebecca's eldest son by her first marriage. Notoriously outspoken and opinionated and something of an adventurer, Walter was Sheriff of Wiltshire and MP for Bath in 1627 and later for Ludgershall. He was described by Clarendon as one of the chiefs of the Presbyterian party, and was a fierce opponent of despotism. In 1628, after a fracas in which he assaulted the Royalist-supporting Speaker of the House of Commons, King Charles I issued an order for his arrest "for seditious practises and crimes of a high nature", and Walter was eventually imprisoned in the Tower until 1633. He played an active part in the English Civil War on the side of Parliament, and was wounded at the Battle of Edgehill. Yet he was later to become just as vocal an opponent of Cromwell's Protectorship, and after he was accused of attempting to destabilise the kingdom in 1647 he fled to France.

Long returned to England upon the Restoration and was granted the title of 1st Baronet of Whaddon. Upon his death in 1672, the house passed to his eldest son, Sir Walter Long, 2nd Baronet of Whaddon. The house was included by John Aubrey in his historical survey of Wiltshire, completed in 1690. The younger Sir Walter Long made further revisions to the house in 1693, and left his own mark in the form of his engraved initials SWL. However, the younger Walter lived in the house for only some of the period, and it was once again leased to other occupiers. Anthony Greenhill was one such tenant from 1699 to 1700.

=== Since the 18th century ===
Sir Walter Long died without issue, leaving his property to the sons of his sister, who had married Sir Philip Parker of Ewarton in Suffolk. They inherited on condition that they adopt the Long name. The first of these was Calthorpe Parker of Whaddon, who became Calthorpe Parker Long, but he also died without issue. The house was inherited by his nephew Sir Philip Parker a Morley, who also took the name of Long. When he died in 1741, ownership of the 280-acre estate was divided. One part of the estate passed to Sir Philip Parker Long's daughter, Martha, who married John Thynne Howe, Lord Chedworth. This share was later sold in around 1762 to Daniel and Lewis Clutterbuck of Bradford-upon-Avon. However the house itself and around a third of the estate was retained by the main Long family, with ownership passed down over several generations.

For much of the period from the late 17th century until the mid-19th century, Southwick Court was leased to tenants. The MP and political pamphleteer John Trenchard, co-author of The Independent Whig, lived in the house until his death in 1723. In 1733, the manor was being let to one Richard Pinnock for an annual rent of £126. In 1788, further alterations were made to the house and a new set of initials inscribed on the same wing upon which Walter Bush had left his mark more than two centuries before. These carvings, however, have survived the weather less well than their predecessors, making the letters indistinct. In 1820, the occupier was James Chapman with his family.

By mid-century, members of the Long family were again resident, although they were unrelated to the wealthy gentry family who owned the property. The 1851 Census shows 55-year-old John Long living in the house with his wife Sarah and sons John, Joseph and William, and farming the 186-acre estate. They were still there on the night of the 1861 Census; and in 1864 Mrs Long – an invalid according to newspaper reports – sounded the alarm when ten hay ricks were ignited by lightning during an unnaturally fierce thunderstorm. In April 1871, according to Census records, John Long, by then in his mid-70s, still lived in the house, with wife Sarah and adult children John and Sarah. John Long senior died only a few days after the Census report was taken.

Ownership of Southwick Court and its fields may have been divided by then. In 1867, the main Long family estate had been inherited by Richard Penruddocke Long of Rood Ashton. However, the precise allocation of land among members of the Long family is unclear. The Return of Owners of Land survey of 1873 shows Richard Penruddocke Long to own a total of 13,600 acres in and around Rood Ashton and Trowbridge. However, one John Long – presumably elder son of John Long sr who had died two years earlier – is reported to own 68 acres in Southwick, while separately "J Long & others" owned another 59 acres. John Long junior appears to have retired from farming after his father's death and he moved to a different house in nearby Woodmarsh, bordering the Southwick Court estate. That is where he appears in the 1881 Census. At that point, Southwick Court is occupied by his sister-in-law Eliza Greenhill Long, widow of John junior's younger brother Joseph Long, who had died the previous year aged just 53. Eliza lived there, perhaps only for a year or so, with her children Joseph, Eliza, Sarah, William and Florence.

Ownership was by now in flux once again. Penruddocke Long had died in 1875, at the age of just 50, and the family estate was inherited by his own eldest son, Rt Hon Walter Hume Long MP. He leased the house and its farm in 1881 to Christopher William Reakes, from a well-known farming family in the vicinity of Wells. Reakes had previously leased the Long family's Home Farm at Rood Ashton, but exchanged that tenancy in 1881 for Southwick Court, and also leased several hundred acres at Monkton Farleigh. Reakes was the occupier in 1889, and shortly afterwards was married from the house to Mary Elizabeth Kendall. In 1901, Walter Long put the house and surrounding land up for sale, and it was purchased by Reakes for £8,000. He continued to farm the surrounding land for the next three decades. According to Census records, Reakes was resident in the house in 1911 along with wife Mary, and their children Victor, Doris and Norman. William Reakes died in January 1935, followed by his wife in October the same year, but the family continued to own the property for a few more years until it was sold to Herbert H Bell. He was living there on the night of the 1939 Register with his wife Edith, and daughters Susie and Joan.

In 1945, the house was purchased by Kenneth John Foss, who modernised it for the first time, installing electricity and a septic tank. Previously, kitchen waste and sewage had emptied directly into the Lambrok stream. A letter from Foss of that period complains that "the absolute minimum amount of money had been spent on this very old house for a long time. The drains are most unhealthy. There is an open drain inside the kitchen and this, as in the case of the only WC drain, is almost blocked up. They are continually giving off bad odours. The outlets of the drains are into the moat which is dry in summer and any disinfectant used is likely to be injurious to the cattle."

In 1953, when the house was still owned by Foss, Southwick Court was the subject of a front cover feature article in 22 May edition of The Wiltshire News, described as a "gem of Wiltshire architecture". The house was designated as Grade II* listed in 1968.

Southwick Court is still privately owned and is not open to the public.

== Sources ==
- "Southwick". Wiltshire Community History. Wiltshire Council.
- Wiltshire: The Topographical Collections of John Aubrey
- Wiltshire Notes & Queries volume 1 pp 556–560
- Wiltshire Notes & Queries volume 2 pp 24–29, pp 218–222 & pp 254–261
- The Strife of the Roses and Days of the Tudors in the West, William Henry Hamilton Rogers pp137–155 "With the Silver Hand: Stafford of Suthwyke"
- Pevsner, Nikolaus; Cherry, Bridget (revision) (1975). The Buildings of England: Wiltshire. Harmondsworth: Penguin Books. pp. 473–474. ISBN 0-14-071026-4.
