= John Rogers (died 1565) =

English politician

Sir John Rogers (by 1507–1565) was an English member of parliament.

He was the second son of and heir of Sir John Rogers of Bryanston, Dorset and his wife Elizabeth, daughter of Sir William Courtenay of Powderham. He succeeded his father in 1535 and was knighted in 1540.

He served as a justice of the peace (J.P.) for Dorset from 1528 until 1565 and was appointed High Sheriff of Somerset and Dorset for 1552–53. He saw military service during a northern uprising in 1536 and again in 1544, when he was at the Siege of Boulogne.

He was elected knight of the shire (MP) for Dorset in 1545 and was re-elected in 1547, 1555 and 1559.

He died in July 1565 while staying at Beck, Berkshire and was buried in the parish church at Blandford Forum, Dorset. He had married Catherine, the daughter of Sir Richard Weston of Sutton Place, Surrey, who bore him 16 sons and 4 daughters of whom only 5 sons and 2 daughters outlived him. He was succeeded by his son Richard.
