= John Chideock =

Member of the Parliament of England

Sir John IV Chideock (died 1415) was an English landowner, administrator, soldier, and politician who lived at Chideock in Dorset and sat as Member of Parliament for the county in 1414.

== Origins ==
Born about 1375, he was the son and heir of Sir John III Chideock of Chideock (died 1390), himself the son and heir of Sir John II Chideock MP of Chideock who had married the heiress Isabel Fitzpayn (some sources claim that Sir John III and his heirs thus became Barons Fitzpayn). His mother was Joan St Loe, daughter of Sir John St Loe MP of Newton St Loe and his first wife Alice Pavely.

== Career ==
On his father's death in 1390, he inherited family estates at Chideock, More Crichel, and East Chelborough in Dorset and at Allowenshay and Kingston Pitney in Somerset. All but East Chelborough were kept by his father-in-law, Sir Ivo Fitzwaryn, who had undertaken to support his daughter and her husband while under age, and not released for about nine years.

Before March 1398 he was involved in a lawsuit over lands and rents at Kingston Pitney and Yeovil in Somerset against various parties including Alice Holland, Countess of Kent, Joan Fitzalan, Countess of Hereford, and an unidentified Richard Chideock. This dragged on until May 1402 when he agreed to pay 800 marks to Alice, for which he had to borrow 770 marks from his wife's brother-in-law Richard Whittington MP. It is possible that his stepfather John Bathe MP, who was on good terms with Alice and her family, encouraged him to reach a settlement.

In 1409, when his stepfather died, he inherited further estates that had belonged to his mother. These were situated at Little Crichel in Dorset, Westbury and Hilperton in Wiltshire, and Clifton and Frampton-on-Severn in Gloucestershire. To all these landholdings, which made him a wealthy man, were added the whole patrimony of the Fitzwaryn family when his father-in-law died in 1414 leaving his wife sole heiress.

Despite his prominent position as a landowner, he does not seem to have accepted public responsibilities until relatively late in life. He was on a royal commission of inquiry for Dorset in 1412, was elected MP for the county in 1414, and was knighted in 1415. While there is no evidence that he served in the first expedition to France of King Henry V, there is a tradition that his death on 25 or 28 September 1415 was at the Siege of Harfleur. A commission for probate was issued on 10 October 1415.

== Family ==
Before 26 August 1390, while still a minor, he was married to Eleanor Fitzwaryn, born about 1378 as the daughter and eventual heiress of Sir Ivo Fitzwaryn MP of Caundle Haddon and his wife Maud Argentine, daughter and coheiress of Sir John Argentine MP. The couple had two children:

John V Chideock (1401-1450), later knighted, who married Catherine Lumley (died 1461), daughter of Ralph Lumley, 1st Baron Lumley, and his wife Eleanor Nevill.
Elizabeth Chideock (died 1464), who married first William Massey and secondly Walter Fitzwalter, 5th Baron Fitzwalter.

Before 11 February 1416, his widow married Ralph Bush MP and had three more children before she died in December 1433.
