= John Hamely =

Sir John Hamely or Hamylyn (after 1324 – 1399), of Wimborne St. Giles, Dorset, was an English Member of Parliament (MP).

He was a Member of the Parliament of England for Liskeard in 1355, for Lostwithiel in 1355, 1358, for Truro in 1355, 1358 for Cornwall in 1357, 1360 and 1362, for Launceston in 1358, for Helston in 1358 and 1361, for Bodmin in 1361, for Dorset in 1371, 1376, January 1377 and 1391.
