= Dorset Trained Bands =

Part-time military force in the maritime county of Dorsetshire

- Active: 1558–1662
- Country: England
- Branch: Trained Bands
- Role: Infantry and Cavalry
- Engagements: Second Bishops' War; Siege of Sherborne

The Dorset Trained Bands were a part-time militia force recruited from Dorsetshire in South West England, first organised in 1558. They were periodically embodied for home defence and internal security, including the Spanish Armada campaign in 1588, and saw active service during the Wars of the Three Kingdoms. They were reformed into the Dorset Militia in 1661.

== Early history ==
The English militia was descended from the Anglo-Saxon Fyrd, the military force raised from the freemen of the shires under command of their Sheriff. It continued under the Norman kings, and was reorganised under the Assizes of Arms of 1181 and 1252, and again by King Edward I's Statute of Winchester of 1285.

== Dorset Trained Bands ==
The legal basis of the militia was updated by two acts of 1557 covering musters (4 & 5 Ph. & M. c. 3) and the maintenance of horses and armour (4 & 5 Ph. & M. c. 2). The county militia was now under the lord lieutenant, assisted by the deputy lieutenants and justices of the peace. The entry into force of these Acts in 1558 is seen as the starting date for the organised county militia in England. Although the militia obligation was universal, it was impractical to train and equip every able-bodied man, so after 1572 the practice was to select a proportion of men for the Trained Bands, who were mustered for regular training. In 1573 Dorset was only required to find 500 men, a small force given the length of the county's coastline, but by 1583 it was required to put 3000 men 'in readiness'.

=== Spanish War ===
When war broke out with Spain training and equipping the militia became a priority. From 1584 counties were organised into groups for training purposes, with emphasis on the invasion-threatened 'maritime' counties including Dorset. These counties were given precedence for training by professional captains under the Lord Lieutenant. In compensation for paying for this training, these counties received a lower quota of men to fill, which meant that they provided a smaller but better-trained force; untrained men could be employed as pioneers. In 1584 Dorset was charged with finding 800 'shot' (armed with firearms such as calivers and muskets), 200 bowmen and 500 'corslets' (body armour, signifying pikemen). for a total of 1500 men, and the actual numbers certified were 770, 350 and 440 respectively, a total of 1560.

In November 1587 Dorset's full strength was estimated at 3,220 'able men furnished, besides pioneers, carters and victuallers and such others as are appointed to keep home for guarding the sconces, bulwarks and bridges'. Early in 1588 the veteran Sir John Norreys was sent with his officers to supervise the preparations in the maritime counties of Dorset, Hampshire, Sussex and Kent. They completed their work in Dorset in April, the Lord Lieutenant certifying the county's strength as 1500 trained men in companies under captains and 1800 untrained foot, together with 120 'lances' (heavy cavalry), 90 light horse and 40 'petronel's (the petronel was an early cavalry firearm). In May a meeting with the county lieutenancy drew up deployment plans for the Dorset TBs if as seemed likely a Spanish invasion was launched. A force of 120 lancers, 40 light horse, and 600 pioneers were assigned to the main army, to be accompanied by a suggested 2000 foot under deputy lieutenant George Trenchard.

The arrival of the Spanish Armada that summer led to the mobilisation of the trained bands on 23 July, the Dorset cavalry and 1000 foot being sent to London. It was reported that one of the Dorset contingents had offered £500 for the honour of serving as the royal bodyguard. The army assembled in the camp at Tilbury where Queen Elizabeth gave her Tilbury speech on 9 August. The rest of the Dorset men went to their stations when the fire beacons were lighted and shadowed the Spanish fleet as it sailed up the English Channel. When the invasion beacons were lighted in Hampshire, the Dorset TBs marched to their neighbours' aid. After the defeat of the Armada, the army was dispersed to its counties to avoid supply problems, but the men were to hold themselves in readiness. There were several more alarms over the following years, notably in 1596, and the Trained Bands were regularly mustered and exercised, but were never called to active service.

In the 16th Century little distinction was made between the militia and the troops levied by the counties for overseas expeditions. However, the counties usually conscripted the unemployed and criminals rather than send the trained bandsmen. Between 1585 and 1602 Dorset supplied 470 men for service in Ireland, 600 for France and 260 for the Netherlands. The men were given 'conduct money' to get to the ports of embarkation. Conduct money was recovered from the government, but replacing the weapons issued to the levies from the militia armouries was a heavy cost on the counties. The JPs of Dorset were heavily criticised for their choice of two completely unqualified men to act as captains

With the passing of the threat of invasion, the trained bands declined in the early 17th Century. Later, King Charles I attempted to reform them into a national force or 'Perfect Militia' answering to the king rather than local control. The Dorset Trained Bands of 1638 consisted of 2140 men, 1444 armed with muskets and 696 corslets. They also mustered 100 horse. The towns of Dorchester and Weymouth maintained their own contingents.

=== Bishops' wars ===
Dorset was ordered to send 600 men overland to Newcastle upon Tyne for the Second Bishops' War of 1640. However, substitution was rife and many of those sent on this unpopular service would have been untrained replacements. Moreover, they were undisciplined. On the march north Lieutenant William Mohun attempted to impose discipline on the men of Captain Lewkner's Dorset company. His harshness led to resentment, and he was rumoured to be a 'Papist', while the Dorset men were largely Puritans. When the company reached Faringdon in Berkshire this resentment became mutiny. A drummer disobeyed an order and struck Mohun with his drumstick, upon which the officer nearly cut off his hand with a sword blow. In retaliation the soldiers stormed the officers' quarters, allowing Lewkner and the Ensign to escape, but beating Mohun with cudgels and leaving him for dead. Mohun recovered consciousness and was receiving medical attention when the soldiers heard of his recovery, broke into the house and finished him off after a fight. Many of the Dorset men then deserted, others remaining for fear that desertion would imply guilt in the murder. The Berkshire Trained Bands at Abingdon were called out to suppress the mutineers and stop them plundering Faringdon, but were too few to confront the mutineers until they had been reinforced from other parts of the county. The 600 men of the Dorset TBs were offered pardons if they turned themselves in; 13 men were exempted from pardon, of whom three had been caught. When the Dorset TBs continued their march to join the army there were only 340 men with the colours.

=== Civil war ===
Control of the militia was one of the major points of dispute between Charles I and Parliament that led to the First English Civil War. Once hostilities began, neither side made much further use of the Trained Bands except as a source of recruits and weapons for their own full-time regiments. Early in the conflict in September 1642 Dorset Trained Bandsmen were called out by both sides for the Siege of Sherborne Castle: Hugh Rogers of Bryanston assembled around 1000 TB foot for the Marquess of Hertford's Royalist army, and joined the garrison, while Sir Thomas Trenchard organised another regiment for Parliament, which formed part of the besieging force under the Earl of Bedford, which arrived on 2 September. The Dorchester Trained Band also supplied 250 Foot to the besiegers. Bedford blockaded the castle rather than investing it in a close siege, and the Royalists re-occupied the town below. Bedford pulled back to Yeovil on 6 September and drove off a small Royalist force that followed him; he then fell back to Dorchester. Hertford held on to Sherborne until 18 September, when news arrived that the Parliamentarians had captured Portsmouth. He then abandoned the place, withdrawing some of his forces to South Wales while others fell back into Cornwall. Those members of the Dorset TBs who had not joined one of the fulltime regiments presumably dispersed to their homes. The Dorchester TB was present when that town was captured virtually without a fight in August 1643 by the Royalists under the Earl of Carnarvon.

Once Parliament had re-established full control it passed new Militia Acts in 1648 and 1650 that replaced lords lieutenant with county commissioners appointed by Parliament or the Council of State. At the same time the term 'Trained Band' began to disappear in most counties. Under the Commonwealth and Protectorate the militia received pay when called out, and operated alongside the New Model Army to control the country.

== Restoration Militia ==
After the Restoration of the Monarchy, the English Militia was re-established by the Militia Act 1661 under the control of the king's lords-lieutenant, the men to be selected by ballot. This was popularly seen as the 'Constitutional Force' to counterbalance a 'Standing Army' tainted by association with the New Model Army that had supported Cromwell's military dictatorship, and almost the whole burden of home defence and internal security was entrusted to the militia under politically reliable local landowners. The militia were frequently called out during the reign of King Charles II; their duties included suppressing non-conformist religious assemblies (of which there were many in the West Country) under the Conventicle Act 1664. The Dorset Militia was one of the few county forces that ever saw action, during the Monmouth Rebellion. Over the following centuries the militia was periodically reformed, and served in home defence for all of Britain's major wars. In its final form, the Dorset Militia was a reserve battalion of the Dorset Regiment, training thousands of recruits for frontline service in World War I.

== Colours ==
A regimental or company Colour is recorded for Colonel Hugh Rogers' Regiment. It was white with in the top left was a cloud with an eye looking out, and beside it a shield with the Coat of arms of Rogers. In the bottom left was a green leaf. There were two mottos on swirling banners across the flag: (above) 'Sume put their trusst in Charetes and som in horses but we will rember the nam of the Lord our God'; (below) 'Our Fathers hoped in thee tahy trusted in thee and yu didsst deleour them'.
