= Walter FitzWalter, 7th Baron FitzWalter =

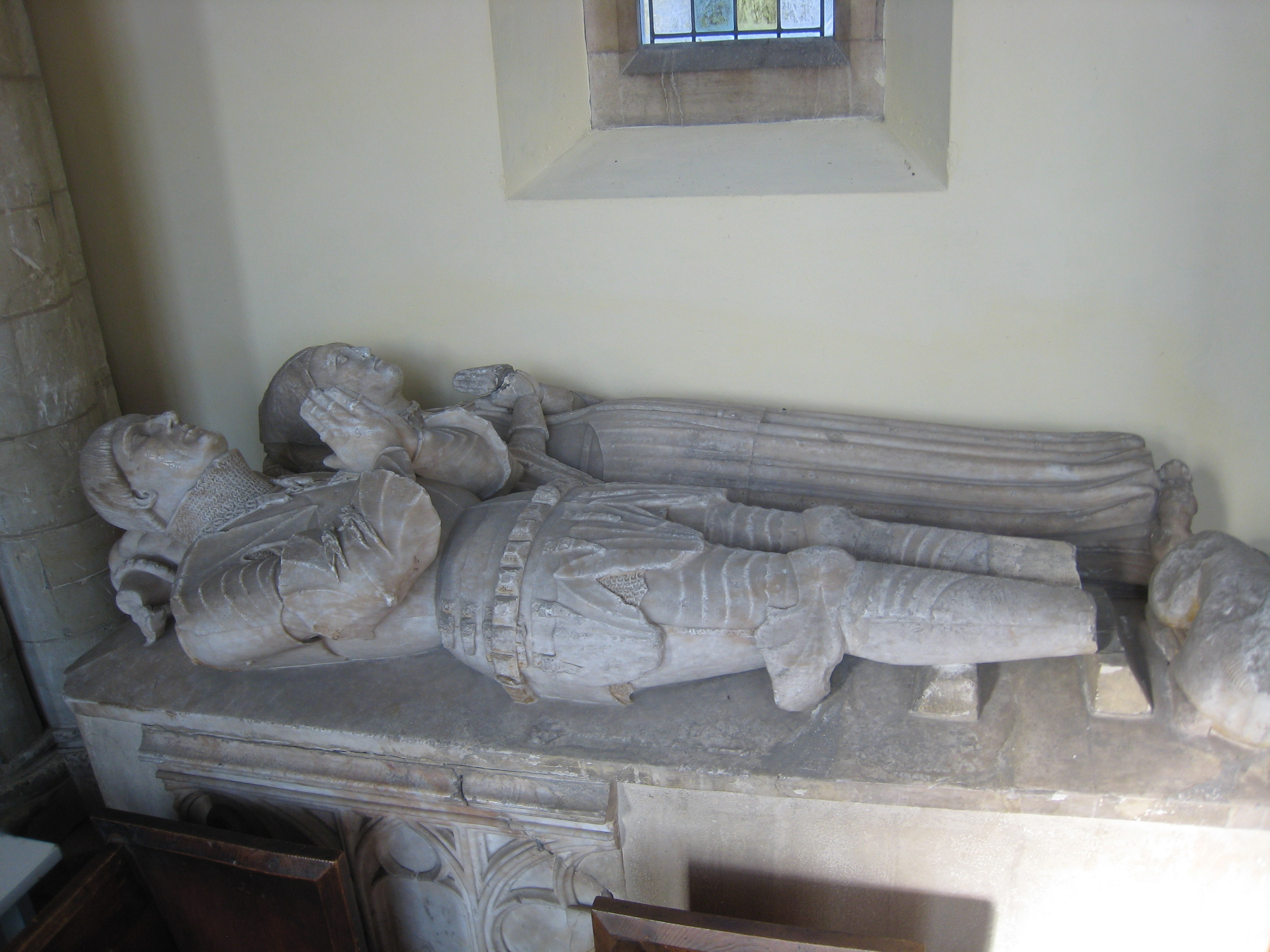
Tomb of Sir Walter Fitzwalter 7th Baron Fitzwalter and his wife Elizabeth Chideock

Walter FitzWalter, 7th (or 5th) Baron FitzWalter (around 1400 – 23 November 1431) was an English soldier and nobleman.

== Biography ==
Walter was the second son of Walter Fitzwalter, 5th (or 4th) Baron Fitzwalter (1368-1406) and Joan Devereux (1379-1409), daughter of John Devereux, 1st Baron Devereux.

After the death of his parents, he was raised by his father's stepmother Philippa Mohun, and her third husband Edward, 2nd Duke of York. In 1415, Walter became 7th Baron Fitzwalter after the death of his older brother Humpfrey. Walter became a permanent guest at the English court and was knighted by King Henry V of England in 1420.

The same year he participated in the Hundred Years' War with the English King, who was campaigning in Normandy, and he was present at the siege of Melun between July and November 1420. On 22 March 1421 he participated in the lost Battle of Baugé and was taken prisoner by the French. He was only released in 1423, after a considerable ransom had been paid.

He was approached in 1425 by Humphrey, Duke of Gloucester to lead an English fleet, to claim the counties of Holland and Zeeland, in the name of Humphrey's fiancé Jacqueline, Countess of Hainaut. In January 1426, Walter landed with his men in Zeeland, where the Battle of Brouwershaven took place. The English and their Zeeland supporters were overwhelmed by the Flemish-Burgundian fleet of Philip the Good and had to flee with great losses.

In 1429 and 1430, Walter had a seat in the Parliament of England and in 1431 again participated in a campaign in France in 1431. There he soon died under unknown circumstances. Walter was the last male-line only descendant of Rollo, the first Duke of Normandy and great-great-great grandfather to William the Conqueror to whom all English (and later British) monarchs all descend from, even to this day. His body was transferred to England and buried in the Little Dunmow Priory located in the county of Essex.

He was succeeded by his only daughter Elisabeth Fitzwalter (1430-1505), from his marriage with Elizabeth Chideock, daughter of John Chideock.

== Sources ==
- Oxford Dictionary of National Biography, from the earliest times to the year 2000 (ODNB) : Walter Fitzwalter, fifth Baron Fitzwalter (1400–1431) by Christopher Starr. Oxford University Press, Oxford 2004, ISBN 0-19-861411-X
