= Robert More (MP for Dorset) =

English politician

Robert More (c. 1377 – 4 March 1422) of Stinsford, Dorset, was an English politician.

More was a Member of Parliament for Dorset in 1417.
