= 1876 Dorset by-election =

UK Parliamentary by-election

The 1876 Dorset by-election was fought on 3 February 1876. The by-election was fought due to the elevation to the peerage of the incumbent Conservative MP, Henry Sturt. It was won by the Conservative candidate Edward Digby. The other candidate stood as a "Conservative, and tenant farmer" candidate.

Dorset by-election, 1876
Party	Candidate	Votes	%	±%
Conservative	Edward Digby	3,060	62.1	N/A
Conservative and tenant farmer	Mr. Fowler	1,866	37.9	New
Majority		1,194	24.2	N/A
Turnout		4,926	69.0	N/A
Conservative hold		Swing		
