= John Perle (died 1402) =

English politician

John Perle (died 1402), of Dorchester, Dorset, was an English politician.

== Family ==
He was the son of MP, Walter Perle.

== Career ==
He was a member (MP) of the parliament of England for Dorchester in February 1388 and for Dorset in 1394.
