= Battle of Brouwershaven =

1426 battle in Europe

- Part of Hook and Cod wars
Date	13 January 1426
Location	Brouwershaven
Result	Burgundian victory

Belligerents
Forces of Jacqueline, Countess of Hainaut: Hooks; English troops loyal to Humphrey, Duke of Gloucester	Burgundian State and Cod allies

Commanders and leaders
Floris, Lord of Heemstedt; Walter FitzWalter, 7th Baron FitzWalter	Philip the Good

Strength
c. 4,000, inc. 1,200 English	c. 4,000

Casualties and losses
c. 3,000 killed, 200 captured	Unknown

The Battle of Brouwershaven was fought on 13 January 1426 in Brouwershaven, Zeeland. The battle was part of the Hook and Cod wars waged over control of the Low Countries and resulted in a significant victory for Philip the Good, Duke of Burgundy.

== Factions ==
The origins of the conflict lay in a succession dispute between Jacqueline of Hainaut and John III, Duke of Bavaria over the Counties of Hainaut, Holland and Zeeland following the death of Count William VI in 1417. Jaqueline had originally been married to John IV, Duke of Brabant but in complex circumstances, had had this marriage set aside and, in 1422, married Humphrey, Duke of Gloucester, brother of Henry V. Jaqueline's second marriage left Hainaut in the hands of John of Brabant, who had reached a rapprochement with John of Bavaria. John had made Philip of Burgundy his heir and this led him to take a role in the dispute.

In 1424, Jaqueline and Humphrey had landed with English forces and quickly overrun Hainaut. The death of John of Bavaria in January 1425 led to short campaign by Burgundian forces in pursuit of Philip's claim and the English were ousted. Jaqueline had ended the war in the custody of Philip but in September 1425 escaped to Gouda, where she again asserted her rights. As leader of the Hooks, she drew most of her support from the petty nobility and small towns. Her opponents, the Cods, were drawn largely from the burghers of the cities, including Rotterdam and Dordrecht.

== Events leading to the battle ==
Jaqueline requested support from her husband Humphrey, who was in England, and he set about raising a force of 1500 English troops to reinforce her, led by Walter FitzWalter, 7th Baron FitzWalter. In the meantime, Jaqueline's army had defeated a Burgundian force of city militia at the Battle of Alphen on 22 October 1425. Duke Philip had plenty of notice of the assembly of the English force and raised a fleet to intercept them at sea. Although he did succeed in catching a small part of the English force, consisting of 300 men, most of the English force made landfall at the port of Brouwershaven, where they rendezvoused with their Zeeland allies.

== Composition of the armies ==
The Duke of Burgundy personally led the Burgundian army landed at Brouwershaven, consisting of his own feudal retainers and municipal militia from Dordrecht, The Hague, and Delft. The force consisted of about 4000 combatants, including gunners from Dordrecht and over 1000 militia crossbowmen.

The Zeelanders, led by the Lord of Haamstede, numbered about 3000 men, reinforced by the English, who were reduced to about 1200 men.

== Battle ==
The Zeelander forces allowed their opponents to land unopposed from boats, perhaps hoping for an Agincourt-like triumph with the aid of their English allies.

However, when the Burgundians were still disembarking, the English led an attack, advancing in good order, giving a great shout and blowing trumpets. The English troops were bombarded with a cannonade and a volley of arbalest bolts from the militia. The well-disciplined English longbowmen held firm and then shot back with their longbows, quickly scattering the crossbowmen in disarray. The well-armored and equally disciplined Burgundian knights then advanced and came to grips with the English men-at-arms. Unable to withstand the fierce attack of the knights, the English men-at-arms and archers were driven onto a dike and were virtually wiped out. The Chronyk en Historie van Zeeland of Janus Reygersberg records that three thousand of the Zeeland army were killed, and many captured. Duke Philip himself noted 200 Englishmen were captured. A number of the local nobility are also recorded to have been killed in the battle, though the Lord of Heemstede was captured and Lord Fitzwalter escaped.

== Aftermath ==
The loss was devastating to Jacqueline's cause. Duke Humphrey was increasingly preoccupied with politics at home, and had become infatuated with Eleanor Cobham, one of Jacqueline's ladies-in-waiting. In 1428, he married Eleanor after the pope annulled his marriage with Jacqueline. Without foreign support, Jacqueline was unable to resist the full strength of Burgundy, and she was compelled to surrender the administration of her territories to Philip.
