= Edmund Uvedale (died 1606) =

English politician

Sir Edmund Uvedale (died 1606), of Gussage All Saints and Holt Park, Dorset, was an English politician.

He was a Member of Parliament (MP) for Dorset in 1601.
