= Humphrey Stafford (died 1413) =

Member of the Parliament of England

Arms of Stafford of Hook and Southwick: Or, a chevron gules a bordure engrailed sable, first adopted by Sir Humphrey Stafford being the arms of their ancestor William de Stafford of Bramshall near Uttoxeter, Staffordshire, a younger son of Millicent de Stafford (sister and heiress of Robert III de Stafford (died 1193 or 1194) of Stafford Castle, feudal baron of Stafford) by her husband Harvey I Bagot (died 1214)

Sir Humphrey Stafford (c. 1341 – 31 October 1413), of Southwick, Wiltshire; Hooke, Dorset; and Bramshall, Staffordshire, was a member of the fifteenth-century English gentry. He held royal offices firstly in the county of his birth, and later in the west country, particularly Devon and Dorset, and has been called 'one of the wealthiest commoners in England' of the period.

== Early life and career ==
Humphrey Stafford was born some time after 1341, the eldest son of Sir John Stafford of Amblecote and his second wife, Margaret Stafford (a daughter of Ralph, 1st Earl of Stafford, a distant relation). Ralph Stafford was his brother. His first official positions ranged from tax assessor for Wiltshire (1379), JP for the same county a year later, Sheriff of Staffordshire (1383–4), and Member of Parliament for Warwickshire during the October 1383 parliament. Prior to his long parliamentary career, he was primarily a soldier of the crown, generally retained in the armies of the Earls of Stafford, campaigning in France (in 1359), Ireland (1361), and Flanders (1373).

== Family ==
Stafford married twice. In 1365 he married Alice Greville (born c. 1345) of Southwick, Wiltshire, who at the time was a ward of Humphrey de Bohun, 7th Earl of Hereford, and brought Stafford estates in Warwickshire as well as the manor of Southwick Court. His second marriage, around 1387, to Elizabeth d'Aumarle (c. 1345 – 1413) (daughter of William d'Aumarle) gave him those lands in the south-west which formed his later power-base, and allowed him to stand for the Dorset parliamentary constituency for the subsequent twelve parliaments. His second wife also brought him Sir William Bonville of Shute (died 1408) as a brother-in-law. Elizabeth d'Aumarle also married John Maultravers (c. 1342 – 1386) of Hooke, Dorset.

== Later career ==
In 1388, Humphrey Stafford was eventually caught up in the crisis of the Lords Appellant, being required by them to take oaths of loyalty to the regime in Dorset. It was at this time – in a possibly related incident – that members of the Cornish gentry conspired to assassinate him, eventually managing to shoot him 'with a certain engine called a "gunne" so that his life was despaired of.' However, since at the same time he loaned King Richard II 100 marks, and later received a royal appointment to assess the Appellants' forfeited lands there, the king clearly did not see Stafford as a major player in the rebellion locally. Following Richard II's deposition by Henry Bollingbroke in 1399, Stafford does not seem to have lost royal favour by his previous support for the old king; indeed, within a few weeks of Henry's coronation he was referred to as a 'King's Knight' and was granted the royal manor of Seavington, Somerset. By now Stafford was, in E. F. Jacob's words, 'a shire knight of standing and influence,' and of all the gentry in the county, Humphrey was 'at their head for wealth.' His estates were valued in the 1412 tax assessment at around £570 per annum.

== Death ==
Stafford died on 31 October 1413. In his will he left, among other things, his household servants one pound each; to his grooms, 6s.8d. apiece; and to his pages, half that amount. The majority of his bequests were to ecclesiastic institutions: over £23 to Westminster Abbey, £20 to the Benedictine Abbey in Abbotsbury, and £8 for two-years' worth of masses for Stafford's soul. His wife had died two weeks previously. His heir was Sir Humphrey Stafford (died 1442). Stafford also left an illegitimate son, John, by one Emma, of North Bradley; he was the subject of a Papal dispensation in 1408, rose through the ranks of the Roman Catholic Church, and eventually became Bishop of Bath and Wells, Archbishop of Canterbury, and Chancellor of England.
