= George Trenchard (died 1610) =

British Politician

Member of Parliament for Dorset
- In office 7 October 1601 – 29 December 1601

Personal details
- Born: c.1575
- Died: 1610 (aged 35)
- Parent: George Trenchard (c. 1548 – 1630)
- Education: Magdalen College, Oxford

George Trenchard (1575-1610) was an English politician who was a member of parliament (MP) for Dorset in 1601.

He was the eldest son of George Trenchard (c. 1548 – 1630) of Wolveton, Dorset and his wife Anne, daughter of Sir George Speake. He matriculated at Magdalen College, Oxford in November 1588, aged 13, and was admitted to the Middle Temple in October 1594.

Due to his family's standing in the county, Trenchard was chosen as junior member for Dorset in 1601. He was knighted by James I at Hanworth in June 1603. Also in 1603 he married Bridget (d. 1606), the daughter of John Whitson, a Bristol merchant.

His first wife having died in childbirth, he married Penelope, daughter of Lord Thomas Darcy in June 1610. He died later that summer, leaving no heir.

== See also ==
- List of MPs elected to the English parliament in 1601
