= John Bathe (died 1409) =

English politician

John Bathe (died 7/8 October 1409) was an English politician. He sat as MP for Dorset in September 1397 and 1402.

He also served as lieutenant of Thomas, Earl of Kent as constable of Corfe Castle by June 1392 till c. April 1397; Sheriff of Somerset and Dorset from 18 October 1392 till 7 November 1393; justice of the peace from 16 May 1401 till his death; commissioner of oyer and terminer in Dorset in May 1402 and March 1404; commissioner to make proclamation of Henry IV's intention to govern well in May 1402, commissioner of the royal right of presentation to a benefice in March 1404; commissioner of array in July 1402 and August 1403; and tax collector of Dorset in March 1404.

In 1390, he married Joan, the daughter and co-heiress of Sir John St. Loe and had one children (one predeceased him) and possibly three children and three daughters.
