= George Trenchard (c. 1548 – 1630) =

English politician

Member of Parliament for Dorset

Member of Parliament for Bridport

Member of Parliament for Dorchester

Personal details
- Born: c. 1548
- Died: 24 November 1630
- Children: George Trenchard (died 1610)

George Trenchard (c. 1548 – 24 November 1630), of Wolveton and later of Lytchett Matravers, Dorset, was an English politician.

He was a Member of Parliament (MP) for Dorset in 1584, Bridport in 1571 and Dorchester in 1572. His grandfather had been an associate of the 1st Earl of Bedford as commissioner for church goods in Dorset.

He commanded a force of Dorset Trained Bands during the Spanish Armada crisis of 1588.
