= Stephen Derby =

14th century English Member of Parliament

Sir Stephen Derby (fl. 1360–1396), of Langton Long Blandford, Dorset, was an English Member of Parliament (MP).

Derby was a Member of the Parliament of England for Dorset in 1372, 1379, January 1380, November 1380, 1381, May 1382, October 1382, February 1383, October 1383, April 1384, November 1384, 1385, 1386, November 1390 and 1394 and for Somerset in January 1390.
