= Ralph Stafford (died 1410) =

Member of the Parliament of England

Sir Ralph Stafford (c. 1355 – 1410) was a 14th- and 15th-century English MP. He was the second son of Sir John Stafford (died c. 1370), of Bramshall, Staffordshire. He was an influential member of the north Midlands gentry, due to his own office holding as well as the fact that his family was a cadet branch of the powerful Stafford family, later Dukes of Buckingham.

== Early life and career ==
His father, Sir John Stafford, was closely involved in the affairs of the senior branch of the baronial house, and his mother was a daughter of Ralph Stafford, 1st Earl of Stafford. Born around 1355, in August 1373 Stafford made a 'highly advantageous marriage' with Maud Hastang of Leamington Hastings, Warwickshire, who was her father's heiress, and potentially a wealthy woman. Carol Rawcliffe has speculated that this marriage was arranged in order to strengthen the bond between the two branches. He spent the next few years expanding and consolidating his estates, both through inheritance (some from his father), purchase, and suit at Chancery. He worked closely with his brother Humphrey Stafford (c. 1341 – 1413), and probably served with him on the expedition to Flanders in 1373 with the second Earl of Stafford, who at some point in this period granted him an annuity of £10 per annum. In 1383 he left for the continent again as part of Henry Despenser, Bishop of Norwich's attempted Crusade against the Antipope Clement VII. The campaign though, as Rawcliffe says, 'was abandoned within less than six months.' This appears to have been the last of his forays abroad; yet, unlike his brother, he sems to have held far fewer offices than could be expected. Rawcliffe tentatively suggests this could have been caused by a ' belligerent temperament.' For example, he was imprisoned for much of 1390 in the Tower of London.

== Later career ==
Following the deposition of King Richard II, both branches of the Staffords supported the new king, Henry IV. Both Ralph and the new Earl of Stafford, Edmund assisted the suppression of the earl of Kent's rebellion in January 1400. They also took part in the invasion of Scotland that summer; this yielded little result and led, within a couple of weeks, to a swift return to England. Ralph also appears to have involved himself in his son's quarrels with Lord Bergavenny in Feckenham and was bound over with him in 1401.

== Death ==
In Carol Rawcliffe's words, his 'last years passed quietly enough,' and his last major involvement in politics was his attendance in the 1407 Staffordshire parliamentary elections. He died on 1 March 1410; his wife was already dead. His heir was Humphrey Stafford (1384–1419).
