= John Stafford (bishop) =

English archbishop and statesman (died 1452)

- Archbishop of Canterbury; Primate of All England
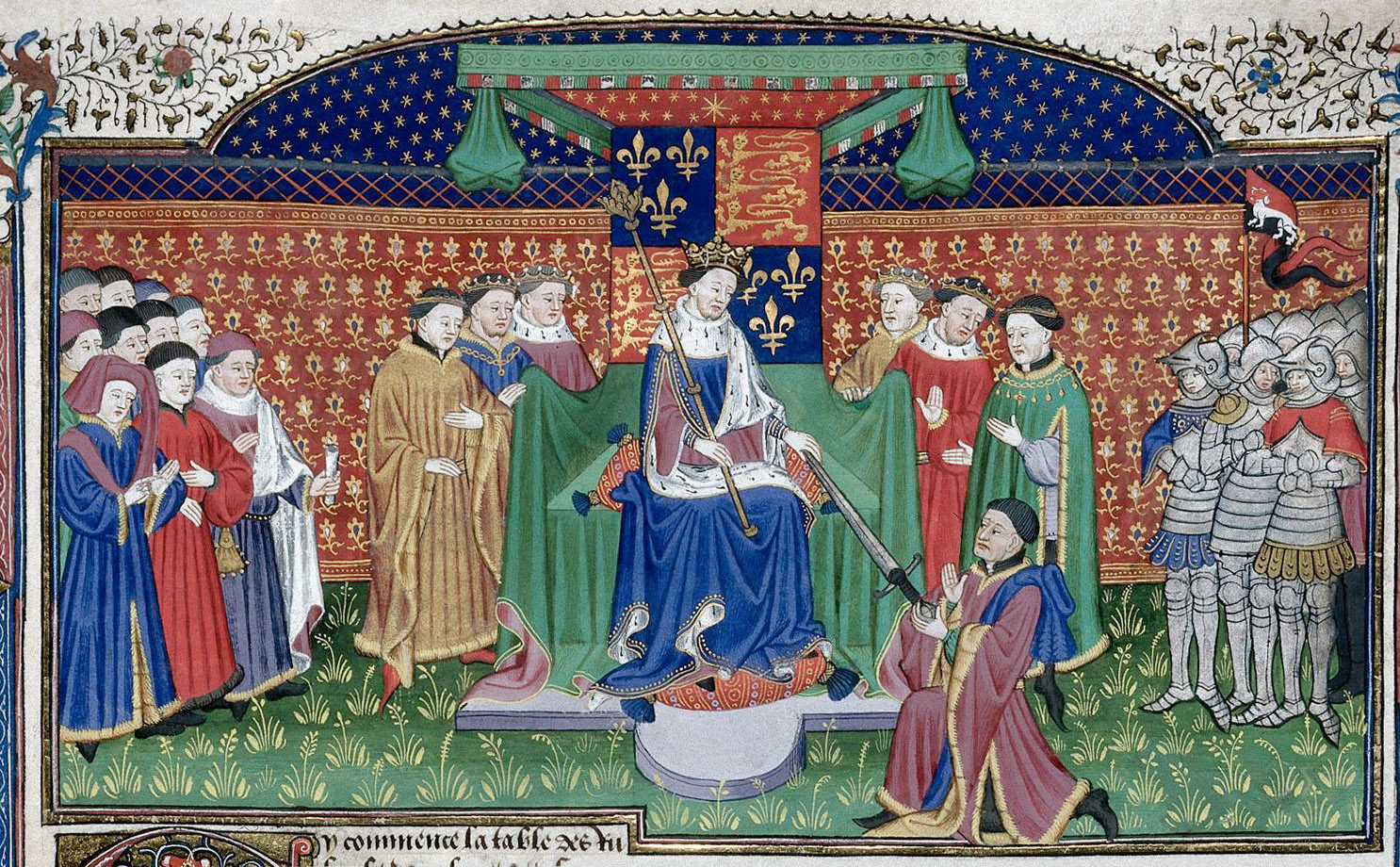
- Henry VI enthroned. The leading figure at far left holding a mace/staff/baton with a purse (containing the Great Seal) attached to his waist appears to be the Lord Chancellor, those items being the symbols of his office. Possibly John Stafford (d.1452), Lord Chancellor (1432-1450) and Archbishop of Canterbury (1443-1452). Detail from "Talbot Shrewsbury Book", 1444-45
- Church: Catholic Church
- Appointed: 13 May 1443
- Installed: unknown
- Term ended: 25 May 1452
- Predecessor: Henry Chichele
- Successor: John Kemp
- Other post: Bishop of Bath and Wells

Orders
- Consecration: translated 13 May 1443

Personal details
- Died: 25 May 1452

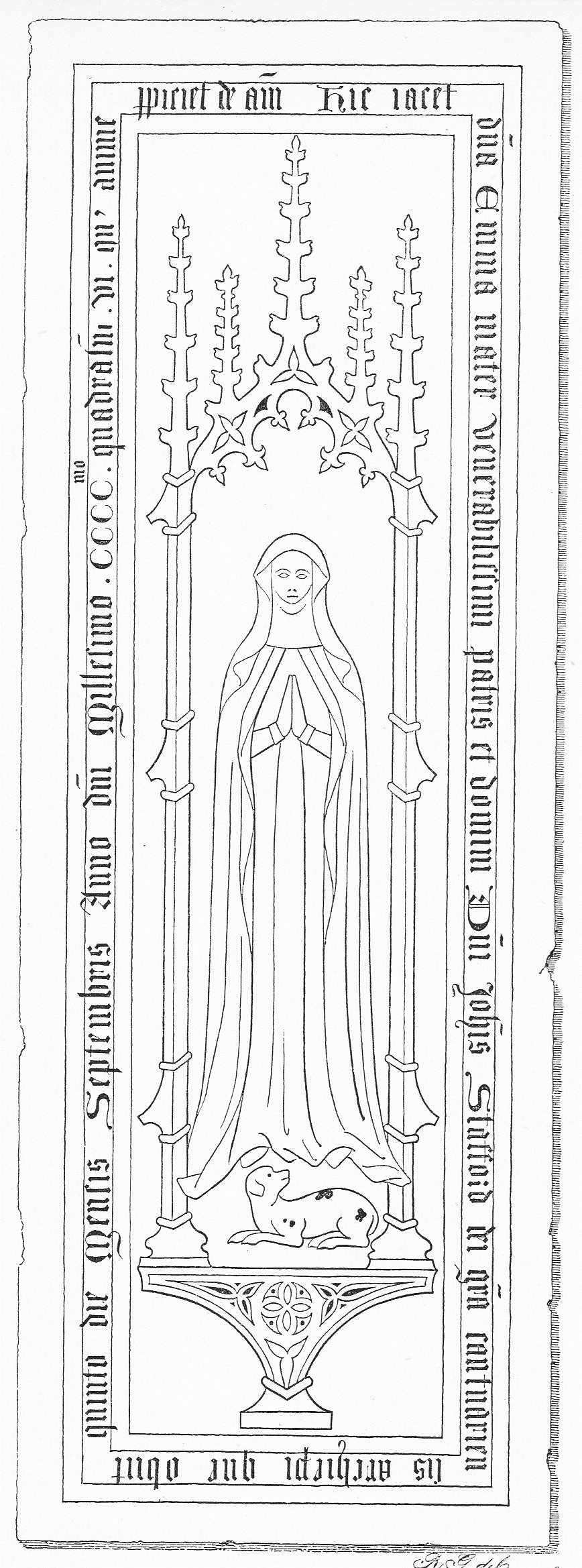
Effigy of Emma, mother of Archbishop John Stafford (d. 1452), North Bradley Church, Wiltshire. Inscription in ledger-line: hic jacet d(omin)a Emma mater Venerabilissimi patris et domini D(omi)ni Joh(ann)is Stafford dei gra(tia) Cantuariensis Archiepi(scopi) qu(a)e obiit quinto die mensis Septembris anno d(omi)ni Mille(n)simo ccc.mo quadra(gen)s(i)mo vi.o cui(us) anime p(ro)piciet(ur) de(us) am(en) ("Here lies Lady Emma mother of the most venerable father and lord, Lord John Stafford by the grace of God Archbishop of Canterbury, who died on the 5th day of the month of September in the one thousandth four hundredth and sixth year of our Lord, on whose soul may God look with favour amen"

John Stafford (died 25 May 1452) was a medieval English prelate and statesman who served as Lord Chancellor (1432–1450) and as Archbishop of Canterbury (1443–1452).

== Early life and education ==
Stafford was the illegitimate son of Sir Humphrey Stafford of Southwick, a Wiltshire squire, and required papal permission before he became the rector of Farmborough, vicar of Bathampton and prebendary of Wells.

He was educated at the University of Oxford.

== Career ==
Stafford was appointed Dean of Arches in 1419 and served as Archdeacon of Salisbury from 1419 to 1421. From 1423 to 1424 he was Dean of Wells.

He came to note under Henry VI, becoming Lord Privy Seal in 1421 and Lord High Treasurer the following year. He was Lord Chancellor from 1432 to 1450.

On 18 December 1424 Pope Martin V made him Bishop of Bath and Wells, and he was consecrated on 27 May 1425. Pope Eugene IV made him Archbishop of Canterbury in May 1443, a position he held until his death on 25 May 1452. He steered an even course between parties as a moderate man and useful official.

His grand nephew Humphrey Stafford of Hooke rose in prominence in the King's party thereafter.

== Citations ==
Political offices
Preceded by John Kemp	Lord Privy Seal; 1421–1422	Succeeded by William Alnwick
Preceded by William Kinwolmarsh	Lord High Treasurer; 1422–1426	Succeeded by The Lord Hungerford
Preceded by John Kemp	Lord Chancellor; 1432–1450	Succeeded by John Kemp
Catholic Church titles
Preceded by Nicholas Bubwith	Bishop of Bath and Wells; 1424–1443	Succeeded by Thomas Beckington
Preceded by Henry Chichele	Archbishop of Canterbury; 1443–1452	Succeeded by John Kemp
