= Southwick, Wiltshire =

Village in Wiltshire, England

Coordinates: 51.296°N 2.235°W

Southwick
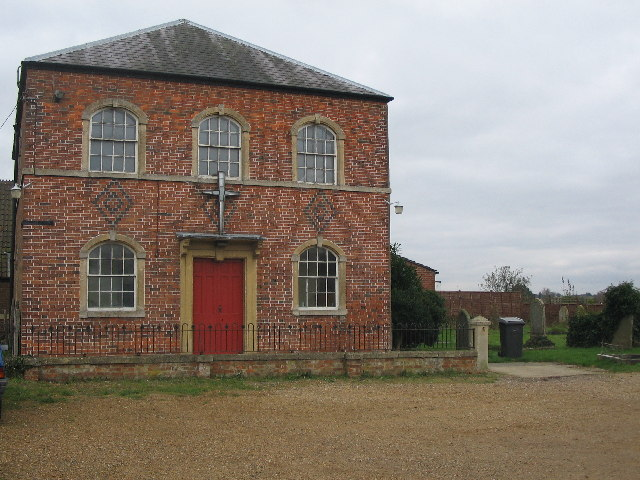
- Baptist chapel (1815), Southwick

- Location within Wiltshire
- Population: 1,953 (2011 census)
- OS grid reference: ST837552
- Civil parish: Southwick
- Unitary authority: Wiltshire
- Ceremonial county: Wiltshire
- Region: South West
- Country: England
- Sovereign state: United Kingdom
- Post town: Trowbridge
- Postcode district: BA14
- Dialling code: 01225
- Police: Wiltshire
- Fire: Dorset and Wiltshire
- Ambulance: South Western
- UK Parliament: South West Wiltshire
- Website: Parish Council

Southwick is a semi-rural village and civil parish 3 miles (4.8 km) south-west of the county town of Trowbridge, Wiltshire, England. It is separated from the south-west fringe of Trowbridge only by the Southwick Country Park, which consists of 380 acres (150 ha) of open fields. The majority of the village lies south of the A361, which runs through the village, linking Trowbridge with Frome.

The parish includes the hamlets of Hoggington and Hoopers Pool.

== Geography ==
The Somerset border lies approximately one mile south-west of Southwick village. Nearby villages are Rode, about 2 miles (3 km) to the south-west, and North Bradley, one mile to the east.

A tributary of the River Biss, the Lambrok Stream, which is fed from streams in the south and west of the parish, flows to the south-east of the village and then turns to form part of the parish's north-eastern boundary with Trowbridge.

== History ==
Southwick, together with North Bradley, was part of Steeple Ashton manor in Anglo-Saxon times. The area was part of the extensive Selwood Forest until 1300. Early landowners included Humphrey Stafford (died 1413) of Southwick Court. He was probably the father of John Stafford (bishop).

Settlement at Southwick began in the early Middle Ages and grew with the woollen cloth industry, weavers working at home for Trowbridge clothiers; the population peaked in the early 19th century.

A National School, with teacher's house, was built on the Frome Road in 1867 on land provided by Richard Penruddocke Long of Rood Ashton House. In Flemish bond brick with limestone dressings, the gothic-style building has a clock tower with a short octagonal stone spire. After enlargement in 1898 the school could accommodate 200. Children of all ages attended until 1931, when those aged 11 and over transferred to secondary schools in Trowbridge. In 1975 the Victorian school was replaced by a new building in the east of the village.

Until 1866, Southwick was part of North Bradley parish. In 1937 some 220 acres in the west of the parish, adjacent to the Somerset village of Rode and containing the small settlement of Rode Hill, was transferred to Rode parish.

== Religious sites ==
=== Baptists ===
Southwick was one of the earliest and largest Baptist centres in Wiltshire, beginning in the mid-17th century. A chapel linked to the Conigre church at Trowbridge stood near Bradley Common throughout the 18th century, and in 1709 another was built on the south side of Wynsome Street, which soon had a congregation of 300. A revival here led to the building of a replacement chapel in 1815, in red brick with stone dressings, under a slate roof. The two tiers of windows light the main hall and the gallery, and there is a sunken baptistery. An attached Sunday school, which at one time had 120 pupils, was rebuilt in the 1870s. The chapel continues in use. Nearby to the north-west, where the road crosses the Lambrok Stream, is an open-air baptistery, rebuilt in stone in 1937 and described by Historic England as "a rare surviving example", although Pevsner states the stonework to be of "suburban character".

A breakaway group from the chapel congregation formed a society of strict Baptists and opened Providence Chapel, built in limestone ashlar, on Frome Road in 1861. The chapel closed in the late 20th century and is now a private house.

=== Church of England ===
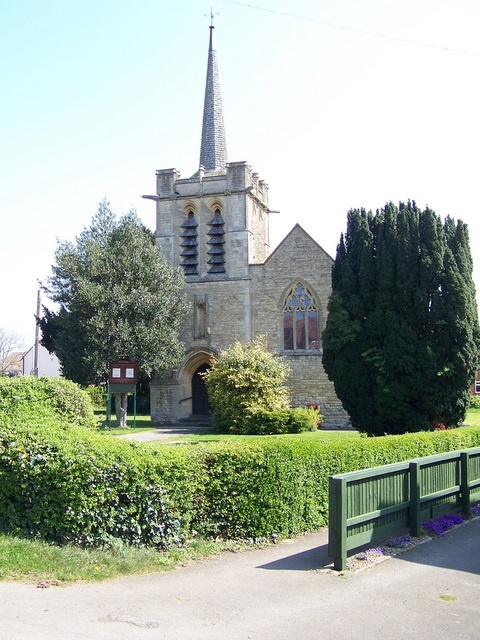
Parish church of St Thomas

Parishioners attended the parish church of St Nicholas at North Bradley until an iron mission church was built in 1881; it was destroyed by fire in 1897. The parish church of St Thomas was built in 1899–1904 to designs of C.E. Ponting, in Gothic style using rock-faced limestone. The two-stage tower is surmounted by a shingled flèche. Inside is a wooden chancel screen in Arts and Crafts style, and an immersion tank for baptism, in keeping with Southwick's Baptist tradition.

== Notable buildings ==
Southwick Court Farmhouse, north-west of the village, is an L-shaped moated stone house from the 16th and 17th centuries, owned by the Longs of Whaddon from the late 17th century until the late 19th. It was probably a replacement for an earlier house owned by the Grenville family from the 13th century, the Stafford family in the 14th century, and the Willoughby family of Brook Hall in the 15th. In the Middle Ages there was a family chapel nearby, dedicated to St John the Baptist; this fell into disuse sometime after 1544 and the building was demolished in 1839.

In 1968 the house was recorded as Grade II* listed, as were the attached gatehouse and the 18th-century bridge.

Brook House, south-east of the village, is a 17th-century farmhouse beside an early 16th-century stone-built range. The Poplars was built in about 1650 and re-faced with brick in about 1700. Manor Farmhouse, west of the village, was built in 1673.

== Governance ==
The civil parish elects a parish council. It is in the area of Wiltshire Council unitary authority, which is responsible for all significant local government functions.

An electoral ward in the same name exists. The ward starts in the west at Southwick and then stretches east to West Ashton. The total ward population taken from the 2011 census was 4,444.

== Amenities ==
The village has a small primary school which is next to a large playing field. Southwick & North Bradley Scout Group have had their headquarters at the old school since 1978.

There are two main residential areas in the north-east of the village, opposite the Southwick Allotments and the 'Farmhouse Inn' pub. The estates are linked, and named Chantry Gardens and Fleur De Lys Drive. In 2011, a small cluster of houses was built north of Fleur De Lys Drive, linked to Fleur De Lys Drive via a short path; this development was named Greenleaze Close. The second large group of housing is located to the south and west of the playing field, and has short roads branching off Blind Lane and Wesley Lane (a road winding from Wynsome Street, between the A361 and North Bradley). These roads are named Southfield, Wesley Close and Orchard Drive. Housing was also developed off Church Street in the mid-2000s, designated The Mowlems and Swan Court.

== Sources ==
- Pevsner, Nikolaus; Cherry, Bridget (revision) (1975). The Buildings of England: Wiltshire. Harmondsworth: Penguin Books. pp. 473–474. ISBN 0-14-071026-4.
