= North Bradley =

Village in Wiltshire, England

Coordinates: 51.296°N 2.208°W

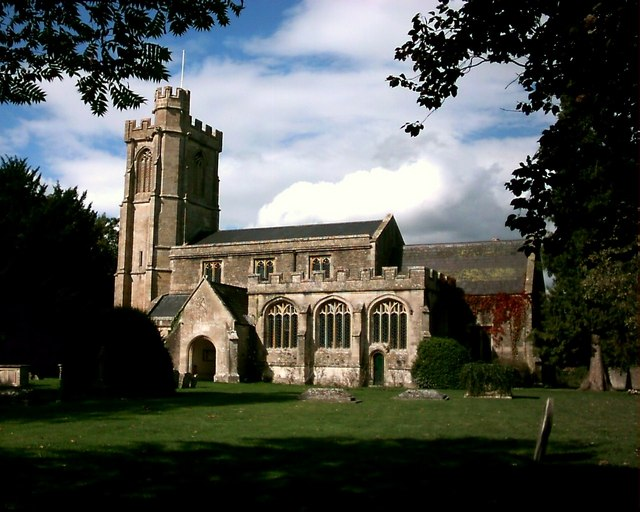
- Church of St. Nicholas, North Bradley

- Location within Wiltshire
- Population: 1,754 (in 2011)
- OS grid reference: ST856552
- Civil parish: North Bradley
- Unitary authority: Wiltshire
- Ceremonial county: Wiltshire
- Region: South West
- Country: England
- Sovereign state: United Kingdom
- Post town: Trowbridge
- Postcode district: BA14
- Dialling code: 01225
- Police: Wiltshire
- Fire: Dorset and Wiltshire
- Ambulance: South Western
- UK Parliament: South West Wiltshire
- Website: Parish Council

North Bradley is a village and civil parish in Wiltshire, England, between Trowbridge and Westbury. The village is about 1.75 miles (2.8 km) south of Trowbridge town centre. The parish includes most of the village of Yarnbrook, and the hamlets of Brokerswood, Cutteridge and Drynham.

== Geography ==
North Bradley village is close to Trowbridge but retains a distinct identity, being separated from the town by small fields (one of which is the home of Trowbridge Town football club).

The north–south road through the village was formerly the A363 but this was diverted to the north in the late 1990s when White Horse Business Park was developed.

The parish extends some 2.5 miles (4.0 km) southwest of North Bradley village, beyond Brokerswood to the boundary with the county of Somerset, near Rudge.

The River Biss flows through the parish. A biological Site of Special Scientific Interest is at Picket Wood and Clanger Wood near Yarnbrook at the extreme east of the parish.

Nearby villages include Southwick (now its own parish, but until 1866 within the parish of North Bradley), Yarnbrook and Rode.

== History ==
At the time of the Domesday Book, North Bradley was part of the manor of Steeple Ashton, in the hundred of Whorwellsdown. It was within Selwood Forest until 1300.

The manor of North Bradley was held by the Long family, jointly with South Wraxall Manor until the death of Walter Long in 1610. After disputes over the inheritance, the manor was settled on his younger son, also Walter, and descended with the Long family of Draycot Cerne. The manor was used mainly as dower or to provide annuities for younger daughters of the Tylney-Long Baronets of Draycot Cerne. Miss Rachel Long (d. 1781) created two charities for the poor of both parishes based on a charge of £5 each on the manor of North Bradley and this was still being paid well into the early 20th century. The manor descended through the Tylney-Longs and Long-Wellesleys until it was finally sold by Henry Wellesley, 1st Earl Cowley in 1864; then in 1879 it was bought by Walter Hume Long of Rood Ashton.

Southwick was a tithing of the parish until it became a separate civil parish in 1866.

== Amenities ==
The village has a primary school.

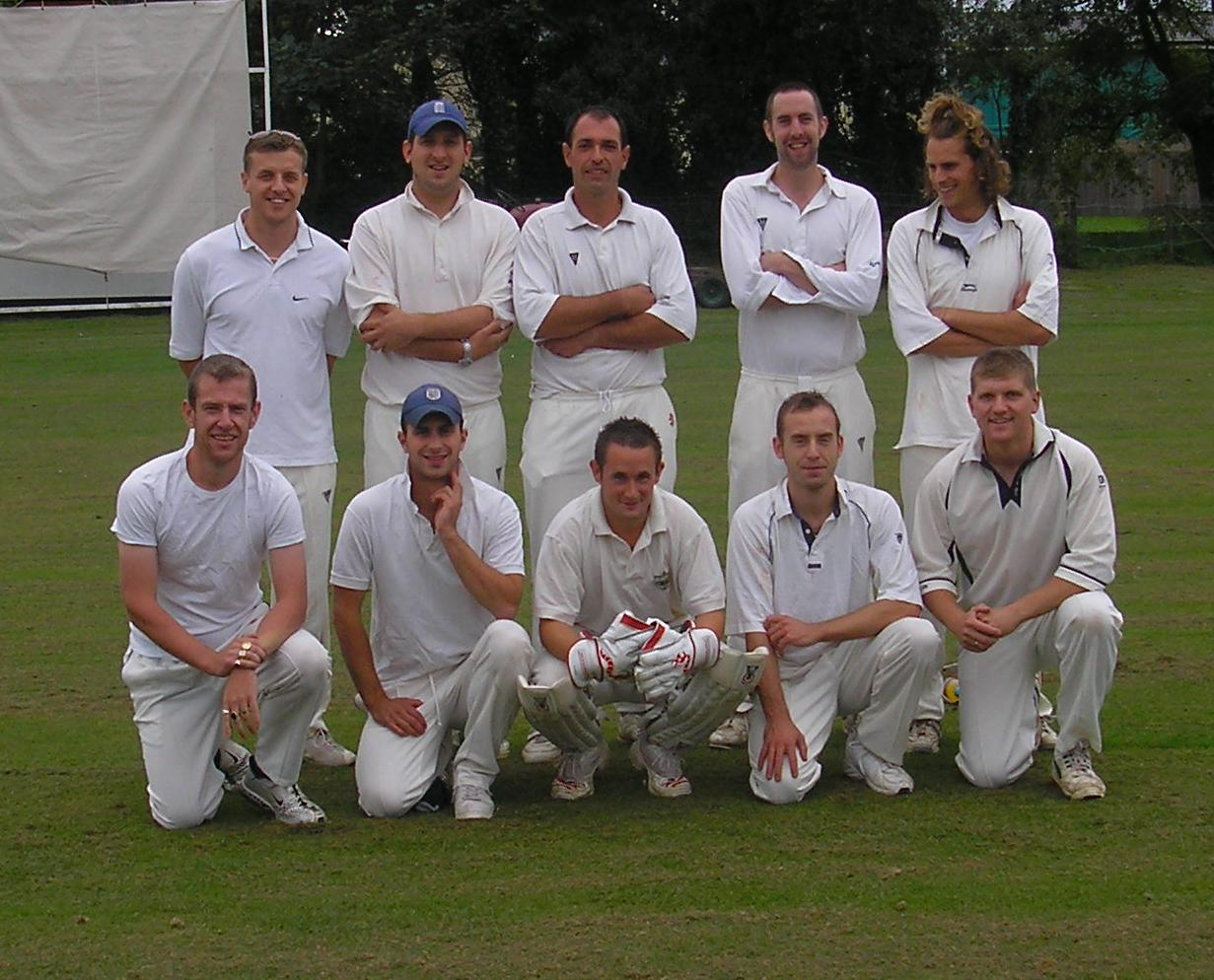
2008 NBCC team

North Bradley Cricket Club was formed in 1867. In 1951, Peace Memorial Field was established, providing the team with its first home. By the mid-1980s the club was on a downward turn, and was in need of revival. Dennis Jones helped re-establish the club, beginning with 'Father and Son' and 'Cricket Club vs Football Club' matches. In 1999, the club entered the Wessex Midweek League and won the championship with an unbeaten record. Between 2005 and 2011 the club played in the Wiltshire County Cricket League.

Brokerswood Country Park offers holiday accommodation and outdoor activities.

== Religion ==
The Anglican Church of St Nicholas is Grade II* listed. The North Chapel contains a memorial to Emma, mother of John Stafford (bishop) of Southwick Court. Dating from the 15th century, it was restored in 1862 by T.H. Wyatt. Southwick extended as far as Rode Hill, adjacent to Rode, Somerset, where Christ Church was built in 1824; this was a chapelry of North Bradley until it was transferred to Rode parish in 1933.

A Particular Baptist church was established in 1775 and a chapel opened at North Bradley in 1780. In 1961 a new building was opened on the same site and the old chapel demolished. As of 2015 the church thrives as a member of the Fellowship of Independent Evangelical Churches.

There is also a Baptist chapel at Yarnbrook.

All Saints Church at Brokerswood is a "tin tabernacle" built with corrugated iron. First erected at Southwick, it was reassembled at Brokerswood in 1905. The area around the church, in the southwest of North Bradley ecclesiastical parish, was transferred to Dilton Marsh in 1973.

== Notable people ==
- John Stafford (bishop) born at Southwick Court, then part of the Parish of North Bradley.
- Charles Daubney (1745–1827), vicar from 1776, restored the church and largely rebuilt the vicarage; later archdeacon of Salisbury
- Emma Pierson (born 1981), actress, lived in North Bradley for 15 years
- Marmaduke Hussey, Baron Hussey of North Bradley
