= Battle of Bridport =

Battle of the Monmouth Rebellion

- Part of The Monmouth Rebellion
| Date | 14 June 1685 |
| Location | Bridport, Dorset |
| Result | Royalist victory |

Belligerents
| Dorset Militia | Monmouth Rebels |

Commanders and leaders
| Col. Thomas Strangeways; Col. Thomas Erle | Lord Grey; Maj. Nathaniel Wade; Lt-Col. Thomas Venner |

Strength
| 1,200 | 500+ |

Casualties and losses
| 2 killed (including Wadham Strangways) some wounded | 7 killed some wounded 23 captured |

The Battle of Bridport was fought on 14 June 1685, at the start of the Monmouth Rebellion in the town of Bridport, in Dorset, England. The battle was a victory for the Royalist forces and the rebels were forced to march to Axminster.

== Background ==
In 1685, the Duke of Monmouth launched a rebellion against James II and landed his rebel forces at Lyme Regis in Dorset on 11 June. He had invaded and began his campaign in the West Country because of the level of support he expected in that strongly Protestant region, where economic recession was hurting the weavers and clothiers. As rebel forces began to muster in the area, the government of James II declared Monmouth to be a traitor and called out the militia forces of Dorset, Somerset, and Devon on 13 June, while the regulars of the Royal Army were assembled.

The Dorset Militia reacted quickly to the invasion and a party of the Militia Horse and the constable's watch were soon patrolling the road between Lyme Regis and Bridport to the east. On 12 June they skirmished with a group of mounted officers from Monmouth's army and although the rebels fiercely charged the militia, killing two and driving them back, the militia and watchmen were backed by large reinforcements, and the rebels soon withdrew.

The Dorset Militia at this time comprised five Regiments of Foot (Infantry) and one Regiment of Horse (Cavalry), which mustered at the following towns:

- Blandford - East Dorset Militia: commanded by Col. Erle
- Bridport - Red Regiment of Dorset: commanded by Col. Strangways
- Dorchester
- Shaftesbury
- Sherborne
- Dorchester - Dorset Regiment of Horse

By 14 June the entire Red Regiment of Dorset, 1,000 strong, had mustered at Bridport under Col. Strangways and began preparations for a rebel attack.

== Order of Battle ==
Royalist Forces

- Red Regiment of Dorset Militia - Colonel Thomas Strangways (1,000)
- East Dorset Militia - Colonel Thomas Erle (100)
- Dorset Volunteer Cavalry - Captain Edward Coker (100)

Rebel forces - Lord Grey

- 4 Companies of Foot - Major Nathaniel Wade (450)
- Troop of Horse - Lt-Colonel Thomas Venner (50)

== Battle ==
On 13 June 1685 the Duke of Monmouth ordered Lord Grey to command a detachment of Foot and Horse and to advance upon Bridport, engage the Royalist militia and force their retreat. Early on the morning of 14 June Grey's force reached the outskirts of Bridport and discovered that the bridge over the River Brit was unguarded, passing easily into the town. A company of pikemen were left to guard the bridge and rear of the rebel forces as the Foot Regiments advanced west, further into town.

As the rebels approached the crossroads, a picket of Dorset Militia called a challenge and fired a volley, which was returned by Grey's men. The firefight continued from street to street until the militia pickets were forced out of the town. Grey moved the rest of his troops forward to secure Bridport, but by this time the entire Red Regiment of Dorset Militia was formed up between the town and the River Asker to the east.

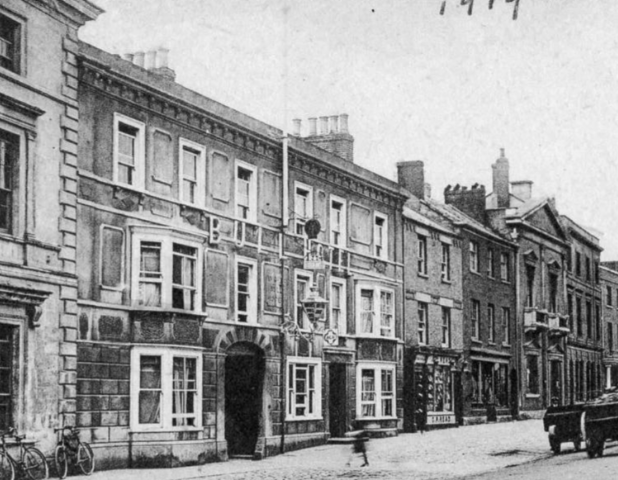
The Bull Inn, where Capts. Coker and Strangeways were killed

Lord Grey began to move his forces east to advance on Colonel Strangeways' militia, but the Dorset Volunteer Cavalry opened fire on the flanks of his regiments from the side streets and buildings of the town. On High Street, the rebels skirmished with the volunteers, who were trying to secure their mounts and broke into the Bull Inn. In the confusion, two militia officers, Capt. Edward Coker (DL for Dorset and son of Robert Coker of Mappowder) and Capt. Wadham Strangways (DL for Dorset and brother of Col, Strangways), were killed by the rebels. Just before he was killed, Capt. Coker shot and wounded Lt-Col. Venner. Meanwhile, Col. Strangways had been joined by Maj. Thomas Erle and some companies of the East Dorset Militia, and the deployed them along with the rest of the Red Regiment at the East Bridge.

Having secured his flanks in the side streets, Lord Grey ordered his Troop of Horse against the militia positions at the East Bridge, but after a swift volley from Strangeways and Erle the rebel cavalry retreated through the village, causing the rebel infantry to begin to retreat. Lt-Col. Venner retreated with his cavalry and infantry, but Col. Wade remained defiant and conducted an organized rebel withdrawal from the town, keeping constant fire on the Dorset Militia. Wade led his forces back to Lyme Regis where they soon encountered the rest of Lord Grey's original force, along with Monmouth and the rest of the rebel cavalry.

== Aftermath ==
The Dorset Militia suffered two officers killed and number of men wounded in the fight, while the rebels suffered seven killed, some wounded, and twenty-three men captured.

The stiff resistance of the Dorset Militia at Bridport, combined with reports that the Somerset and Devon Militias were advancing towards Axminster forced Monmouth to hastily march west before the road to Taunton was blocked. Monmouth quickly reached Axminster and skirmished with the Somerset Militia, easily defeating them and proceeding northwards into Somerset.

On 17 June Lord Churchill reached Bridport with a regiment of Royal Horse and with the Dorset Militia proceeded to shadow Monmouth's advance into Somerset. The rebels and Royalists would clash at Keynsham and Norton St Philip, before the final battle at Sedgemoor ended the rebellion in July.
