= Battle of Norton St Philip =

Battle of the Monmouth Rebellion

- Part of The Monmouth Rebellion
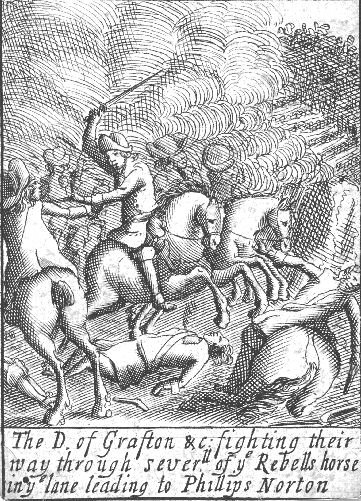
Date	27 June 1685
Location	Norton St Philip, Somerset
Result	Rebel victory

Belligerents
England	Monmouth Rebels

Commanders and leaders
Earl of Feversham; John Churchill; Duke of Grafton	Duke of Monmouth; Nathaniel Wade

Strength
5,000	7,000+

Casualties and losses
20 killed 50+ wounded some captured	24 killed 40 wounded

The Battle of Norton St Philip was fought on 27 June 1685, during the Monmouth Rebellion in the village of Norton St Philip, in Somerset, England. The battle was the last victory for the rebel forces.

== Background ==
Following the Battle of Keynsham on 25 June, Monmouth and the rebels attempted to outmarch the Royal forces and advance towards London, marching east around Bath and reaching Norton St Philip on 26 June. The rebel army was exhausted and went into camp near the village, deploying pickets under Capt. Vincent from Wade's Regiment, and establishing a barricade on the roads to town.

Feversham learnt of Monmouth's march eastwards on the afternoon of 26 June and ordered all the Royal forces and militia to muster at Bath. On the morning of 27 June, having massing his forces at Bath, Feversham marched towards Monmouth's position with his advance units.

== Order of Battle ==
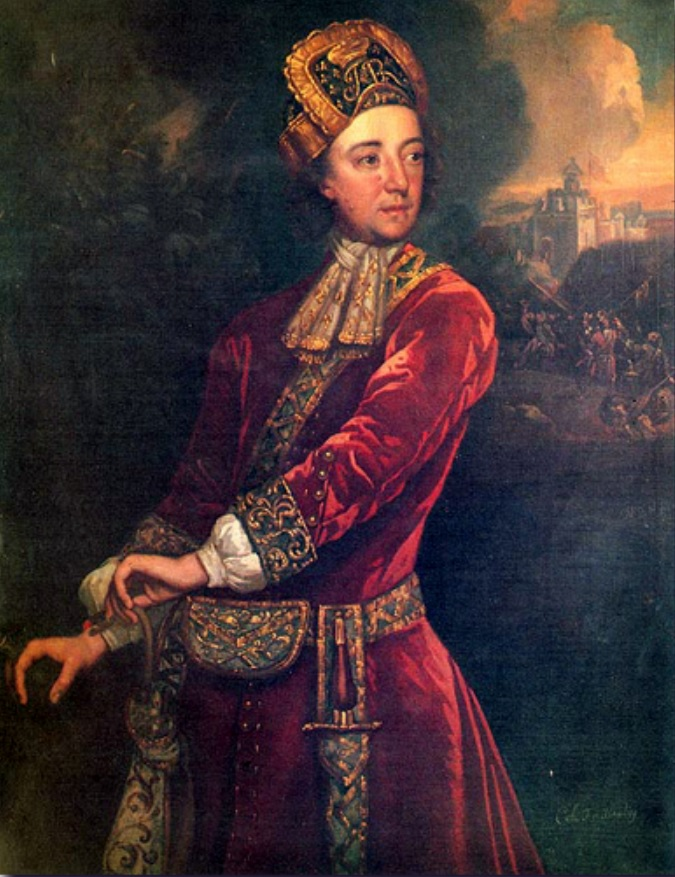
Francis Hawley, captain of the royal grenadiers during the battle

Royal Army - under the command of the Earl of Feversham

- Foot Guards Battalions - Col. Edward Sackville
- Grenadier Companies - Col. Henry FitzRoy and Capt. Hawley
- Churchill's Brigade - Col. John Churchill
- Cavalry Troop - Lt. Col. C. Churchill
- Oxford Blues
- Troops of Horse Grenadiers - Capt. Parker
- Musketeer Battalion - Col. Percy Kirke
- Somerset Militia Battalion
- Dorset Militia Battalion

Rebel forces - under the command of the Duke of Monmouth

- The Duke's (Red) Regiment - Lt. Col. Nathaniel Wade
- Blue (Taunton) Regiment - Lt. Col. Richard Bovett
- Green Regiment - Lt. Col. Abraham Holmes
- Yellow Regiment - Lt. Col. Edward Matthews
- White Regiment - Lt. Col. John Foulkes
- Lifeguards
- Grey's Cavalry
- Artillery

== The Battle ==
On the morning of 27 June, Monmouth's force broke camp and the majority of his troops began marching towards Frome. Only a portion of the rebels remained at Norton under personal command of Monmouth, serving as a rear-guard for the main force. At 11 in the morning, the lead elements of Feversham's force, headed by Capt. Lloyd's Troop of Cavalry advanced down the laneway into the village and attacked the rebel barricade established by Capt. Vincent. After a sharp fight, Lloyd withdrew his company to report back to Feversham and his commanders.

Feversham ordered Grafton to advance with Capt. Hawley's Company of Grenadiers against the barricade, and a fight once again broke out with Vincent, prompting Lt. Col. Wade to bring up the remainder of his regiment to push back Grafton's forces. Capt. Lloyd's troop and Capt. Parker's two Troops of Horse Grenadiers were hastily ordered to support Grafton and Hawley, with Kirke's Musketeer Battalion deployed on the flanks, and as they advanced down the lane, Churchill deployed the Dragoons and Oxford Blues on the fields outside of town. By this time, Grafton and Hawley's forces had almost been surrounded by Wade's men, but with the arrival of Lloyd and Parker, the Royal soldiers fought their way back up the lane, with some of Hawley's men cutting through the thick hedgerows on either side of the lane to escape.

In order to facilitate the escape of Grafton and Hawley's men, Kirke's musketeers opened fire on the flanks of Wade's regiment, forcing Col. Holmes and the Green Regiment to move forward and counterattack. Holmes was assisted by detachments of Grey's Cavalry and, fighting through the hedgerows, forced Kirke's men to break and retreat to the protection of the Dragoons in the fields. Across the battle line, the Royal forces were pushed back up lane, and Monmouth's men cheered wildly as they captured the hedgerows. Monmouth brought up his artillery as the Royal forces re-organized on the hill outside the village, and began firing from their defended positions in the lane. By 3 pm, in a driving rain, Feversham had brought up his artillery to counter Monmouth's, and began deploying his forces on the hill to attack the village. Feversham had eight battalions of foot against Monmouth's five, sixteen troops of cavalry with an equal number of rebel cavalry, and eight artillery pieces against Monmouth's four. Though Monmouth's force outnumbered the Royal forces by approximately 2,000 men, Feversham held a strong defensive position uphill from the village, thus the rebels had to force the enemy to attack downwards onto their defensive positions in the hedgerows.

After a two-hour artillery duel and stalemate, neither side had suffered much damage, and Feversham decided to withdraw his forces from the field. At 5 pm, the Royal Army began to withdraw towards Bradford-on-Avon, conceding the battlefield to Monmouth's cheering forces, the last rebel victory of the rebellion.

== Aftermath ==
Feversham reported that the Royal Army had suffered minimal losses at Norton St Philip, with a final estimate of Royal casualties being 20 men killed, over 50 wounded, and some taken prisoner. Monmouth's casualty estimates were 4 officers and 20 men killed, over 40 wounded including senior officers, and no prisoners. The rebels had won the battle at Norton St Philip, but had lost a day of march towards London, and had further exhausted the army. Monmouth marched to Frome on 28 June, and intended on continuing to London. While in Frome however, rebel intelligence reported that Feversham's forces had left Bradford-on-Avon for Westbury where he could flank the road to London via Warminster. The continuation of Monmouth's planned march on London via Warminster now depended upon defeating the Royal Army in an open, pitched battle and he knew that, despite the success at Norton St Philip, such a task was beyond the capabilities of his hastily raised and ill-trained forces. He decided to turn back into Somerset, surrendering both the small tactical advantage recently gained and the operational initiative.

Over 2,000 men would desert Monmouth's army between the battles of Norton St Philip and Sedgemoor, a substantial blow to the rebel army and Monmouth had hoped to join his force with an army of ‘clubmen’ supposedly assembling on the Somerset Levels under Thomas Plaice. The rebels entered Shepton Mallet on 30 June and reached Wells on 1 July. Monmouth's march through Somerset at the beginning of July would lead his army to Sedgemoor, and to the decisive battle of 6 July.
