= Humphrey Bishop =

English politician

Humphrey Bishop (c 1612 - 1675) was an English landowner and politician who sat in the House of Commons from 1661.

== Biography ==
Bishop was the eldest son of John Bishop of Chilcombe, Dorset and his wife Elizabeth Hawley, daughter of Francis Hawley of Buckland Sororum, Somerset and Corfe Castle, Dorset. He succeeded his father to the estate at Chilcombe before 1641. He was commissioner for assessment for Dorset from August 1660 to 1674. He was a colonel of foot militia by November 1660 when he became a Freeman of Poole. He was one of those nominated to become Knight of the Royal Oak with an estate valued £800 per annum. In 1661, he was elected Member of Parliament for Bridport in the Cavalier Parliament. He was commissioner for corporations from 1661 to 1663. In 1662, he became a Freeman of Lyme Regis, a commissioner for loyal and indigent officers and a J.P. He became Deputy Lieutenant in 1664 and was commissioner for pressing seamen in 1665. He was sub-commissioner for prizes at Portsmouth from 1672 to 1674 and commissioner for recusants for Dorset in 1675.

Bishop died between September and November 1675.

Bishop married by licence dated 4 July 1648, Anne Michell, widow of Theobald Michell of Stamerham and daughter of Henry Goring of Highden, Sussex. They had two sons.

Parliament of England
Preceded by John Drake; Henry Henley	Member of Parliament for Bridport; 1661–1675; With: John Strangways	Succeeded by George Bowerman; John Strangways
