= The Keep, Dorchester =

Military museum in Dorchester, Dorset, England

- Dorchester
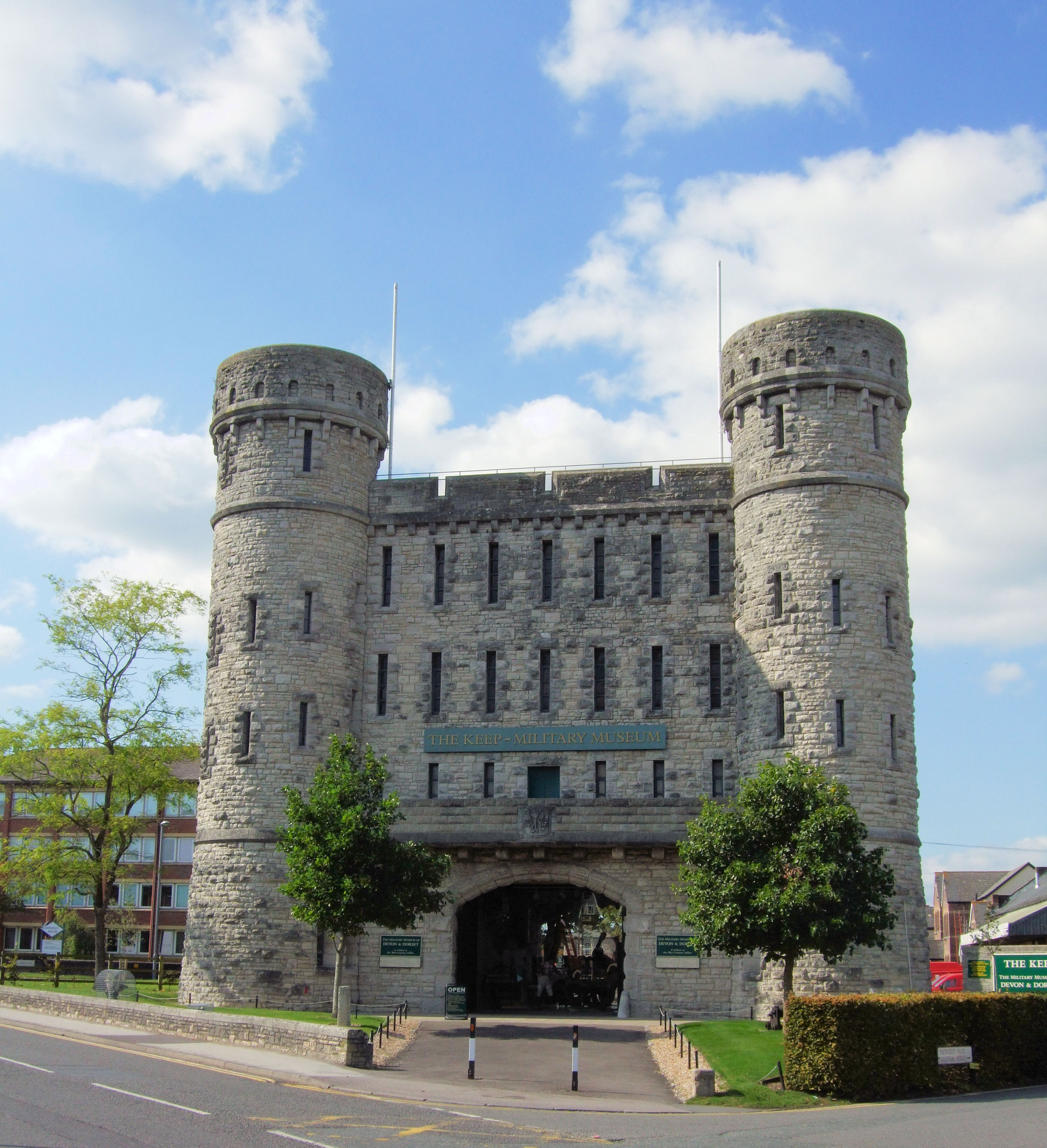
- The Keep

Site information
- Type: Barracks
- Operator: British Army

Location
- Location within Dorset
- Coordinates: 50°42′53″N 02°26′37″W

Site history
- Built: 1877-1881
- Built for: War Office
- In use: 1881-1958

Garrison information
- Occupants: Dorset Regiment

The Keep, Dorchester is part of the former county barracks of the 39th (Dorsetshire) Regiment of Foot and the 54th Regiment of Foot. The barracks were built in about 1880 and housed various regiments as units were amalgamated. It ceased to be used in 1958 and most of the site was redeveloped in the 1960s, but the keep remained in Ministry of Defence hands and is now used as a regimental museum.

It is a Grade II listed building.

== History of the barracks ==
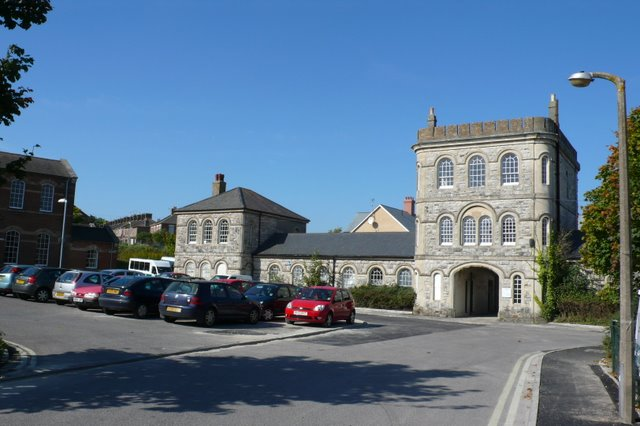
The 'little keep' (part of the former Militia Barracks, dating from 1866) was incorporated into the new Depot.

The Dorchester Depot Barracks were built between 1877 and 1881 on the site of a Militia barracks, which had been established there little over a decade earlier. Their creation took place as part of the Cardwell Reforms which encouraged the localisation of British military forces. The site included a large parade ground, which was laid out between the Keep (or armoury) and the building now known as the 'little keep' and flanked by brick-built barrack blocks (including separate accommodation for officers and other ranks), the officers' mess, a gymnasium, stores, offices and other ancillary buildings.

The barracks became the depot for the 39th (Dorsetshire) Regiment of Foot and the 75th (Stirlingshire) Regiment of Foot. Following the Childers Reforms, the 39th (Dorsetshire) Regiment of Foot amalgamated with the 54th (West Norfolk) Regiment of Foot to form the Dorset Regiment with its depot in the barracks in 1881.

During the Second World War the barracks were occupied by 701st Ordnance Light Maintenance Company and the 1st Quartermaster Company of the United States Army.

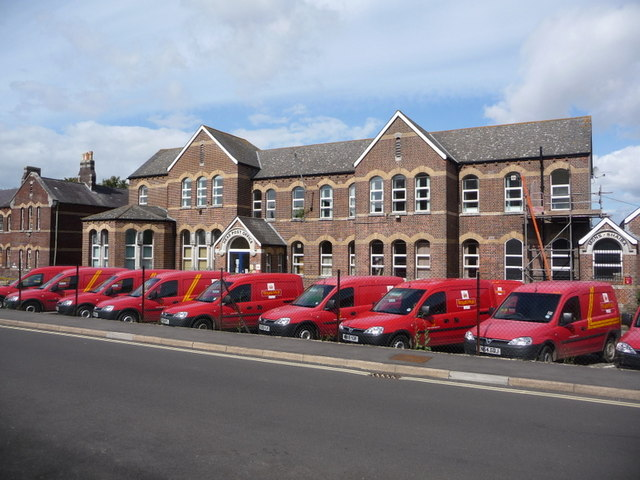
Parts of the former depot barracks are now occupied by Royal Mail

In 1958 the Dorset Regiment amalgamated with the Devonshire Regiment to form the Devonshire and Dorset Regiment and Regimental Headquarters were re-located to Wyvern Barracks in Exeter. The site of the barracks was redeveloped; some buildings (including the long soldiers' barracks block on the west side) were demolished, but several others were sold, being taken over by the County Council and the Royal Mail in the 1960s; a tax office was built on the parade ground. Only the keep was retained by the Ministry of Defence. In 2016 the Council sold one of the former barrack blocks for conversion into residential properties.

Alongside the depot barracks, across Poundbury Road, stood the older Cavalry Barracks (opened in 1795 and later known as Marabout Barracks). Most of that site remains in military use as Dorchester's Army Reserve Centre.

== The museum ==
The keep is now a regimental museum for the Devonshire Regiment, the Dorset Regiment, the Devonshire and Dorset Regiment, The Dorset Yeomanry, Queen's Own Dorset Yeomanry, The Dorset Militia, The Royal Devon Yeomanry and 94 Field Regiment RA. The collection includes Adolf Hitler's desk which was taken from the ruins of the Chancellory in Berlin in 1945.

The museum occupies the keep of the original barracks. It is a Grade II listed building and the ground floor preserves its previous layout. The museum is entered through the ammunition and powder store, and through this is the archway that used to lead to the rest of the barracks. Close to the archway are the guardroom and cells, one of which is equipped as it would have been when it housed prisoners. In the west tower is a rope winding gear to hoist weapons, ammunition and other stores to the upper floors.

The first floor is gained by a spiral stair and is now the regimental museum with a display of uniforms, weapons and equipment used by the regiment during its 300-year history. The second floor has a display of campaign and gallantry medals as well as exhibits showing small arms and silverware. The third floor has displays of objects and information on the recent military history of the regiment, places where it has been deployed and events in which it has taken part. Above this is the battlements where there are extensive views of the town and surrounding countryside.

Issues with the roof forced the museum to close to the public and in February 2026 it was announced that the building was not expected to re-open before the end of the year.
