= Thomas Strangways (1643–1713) =

English politician

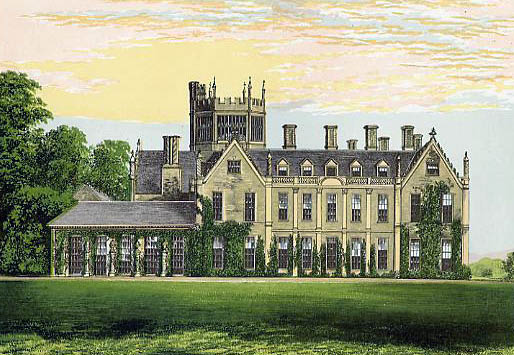
Melbury House, chromolithograph in Morris's Country Seats, 1880

Thomas Strangways (1643–1713) of Melbury House in Melbury Sampford near Evershot, Dorset was an English landowner and Tory politician who sat in the English and British House of Commons between 1673 and 1713. As a militia colonel he was active in opposing the Monmouth rebellion. For his last nine years in Parliament, he was the longest sitting member of the House of Commons (Father of the House).

== Early life ==
Arms of Strangways: Sable, two lions passant paly of six argent and gules

Strangways was born in 1643, the fourth but second surviving son of Giles Strangways (1615-1675), MP of Melbury Sampford and his wife Susanna Edwards, daughter of Thomas Edwards, Mercer, of London and Fair Crouch, Wadhurst, Dorset. He matriculated at Wadham College, Oxford on 6 June 1660. He was a captain in the Dorset Militia Foot by 1671 and became colonel in 1675. On 19 January 1675 he married Susan Ridout, daughter and heiress of John Ridout of Frome, Somerset. He succeeded his brother John in 1676, inheriting the Melbury Sampford estate, where he extended Melbury House.

== Career ==
Strangways’ father obtained the reversion of the post of Clerk of the Pells, an Exchequer sinecure for him in 1673 and nominated him as Country party candidate at by-elections for Weymouth and Melcombe Regis on 31 January 1673 and for Poole on 3 February 1673. Strangways was defeated in both by-elections, but was returned as Member of Parliament for Poole at another by-election on 3 March 1673 through an electoral bargain with Lord Chancellor Shaftesbury. At the 1679 general elections, he was returned as MP for Dorset his family's pocket borough and was also successful in returning supporters at four other Dorset constituencies. He was returned again at the general elections in 1681 and 1685.

After the Duke of Monmouth landed at Lyme, Strangways commanded the Red Regiment of Dorset Militia in the Battle of Bridport, and his brother, Wadham Strangways, was killed in the skirmish. His regiment rendered useful service during the rebellion, but King James was unwilling to reward him with the Clerkship of the Pells for the support, which made him uneasy. His concerns increased in the light of the King's religious policy and from his responses to the repeal of the Test Act and Penal Laws, he lost his local offices, and King James agents were seeking to replace him in Parliament. Nevertheless, he was slow to take sides with William of Orange until the Prince arrived in the country when he was one of the Dorset leaders to welcome him. He was returned to the Convention at the 1689 English general election and served on the elections committee.

Strangways was a leader of the Tories in Dorset, and was returned unopposed at the 1690 English general election. Though generally acting with the Country party, he was sometimes seen as a Court Tory. He took several leaves of absence during the Parliament. Returned again at the 1695 English general election, he refused to sign the Association in February 1696 and voted against fixing the price of guineas at 22s in March. He voted against the attainder of Sir John Fenwick on 25 November 1696. In 1698 he tried to claim the post of Clerk of the Pells for which his father had purchased the reversion, but was unsuccessful. He was returned as a Tory at the 1698 English general election and was expected to oppose the standing army in October. He was returned again at the two general elections in 1701 and was blacklisted for opposing preparations for war with France. On 26 February 1702 he supported the motion to vindicate the Commons’ proceedings in impeaching William III's ministers in the previous session.

Strangways was returned again at the 1702 English general election and voted on 13 February 1703 against the Lords’ amendments to the bill regarding the time to take the oath of abjuration. He also voted for the tack on 28 November 1704, in spite of lobbying by Robert Harley. He was returned at the 1705 English general election and voted against the Court candidate for Speaker on 25 October 1705. He seconded a motion to make further provision for the Duke of Marlborough, and was appointed to the committee to bring in a bill for settling on the Duke a pension of £5,000 p.a.

For his last nine in Parliament, Strangways was the Father of the House being the longest serving member. At the 1708 British general election, he was returned as a Tory and voted against the impeachment of Dr Sacheverell in 1710. After the 1710 British general election, he was classed as a Hanoverian Tory and was a member of the October Club and the Loyal Brotherhood. He was one of the ‘worthy patriots’ who detected the mismanagements of the previous administration. He obtained leave of absence on the grounds of ill-health on 8 April 1712 and stood down at the 1713 British general election in favour of his son Thomas.

== Death and legacy ==
Strangways died on 21 December 1713. By his wife Susan, he had five sons (three of whom predeceased him) and four daughters. His children included:

- Thomas Strangways (born 1683, died 1726), who died without issue.
- John Strangways (born 1688, died 1716), who died without issue.
- Elizabeth Strangways (died 1729), a co-heiress of her brother Thomas Strangways (died 1726). She married James Hamilton, 5th Duke of Hamilton, but died without issue, when her heir became her sister Susanna Strangways.
- Susanna Strangways, a co-heiress of her brother Thomas Strangways (d.1726), and three years later sole heiress of her sister Elizabeth Strangways (died 1729), Duchess of Hamilton. She married Thomas Horner (1688-1741), MP, of Mells Manor in Somerset, Sheriff of Somerset in 1711/12. In accordance with the terms of his wife's inheritance from her childless brother in 1726, Thomas Horner adopted for himself and his descendants the surname and arms of Strangways. Their only surviving child and sole heiress was Elizabeth Strangways (born 1722), who in 1735 at the age of 13 entered into an arranged marriage with Stephen Fox (1704-1776), a 31-year-old homosexual, the eldest surviving son of Sir Stephen Fox (1627-1716), the first Paymaster of the Forces, deemed the "richest commoner in the three kingdoms". In accordance with the marriage Fox also adopted the additional surname of Strangways and the arms of that family, and was later created Earl of Ilchester. The couple had many children.

Parliament of England
Preceded by George Cooper (Sir) John Morton	Member of Parliament for Poole; 1673; With: (Sir) John Morton	Succeeded by Henry Trenchard; Thomas Chafin
Preceded by John Strode; Thomas Browne	Member of Parliament for Dorset; 1679–1707; With: Thomas Freke 1679-1701; Thomas Trenchard 1701-1702; Thomas Chafin 1702-1707	Succeeded by Parliament of Great Britain
Preceded by Sir Christopher Musgrave, 4th Baronet	Father of the House; 1704–1707	Succeeded by Final Father of the House of the Parliament of England
Parliament of Great Britain
Preceded by Parliament of England	Member of Parliament for Dorset; 1707–1713; With: Thomas Chafin 1707-1711; Richard Bingham 1711-1713	Succeeded by George Chafin; Thomas Strangways II
Preceded by First Father of the House of the Parliament of Great Britain	Father of the House; 1707–1713	Succeeded by Richard Onslow
