= John Strangways (died 1676) =

English politician

Arms of Strangways: Sable, two lions passant paly of six argent and gules

John Strangways (15 October 1636 – 6 April 1676) was an English politician who sat in the House of Commons from 1661 to 1676.

== Origins ==
He was the eldest son of Giles Strangways (d.1675). His brothers were Thomas Strangways (1643–1713), MP, and Wadham Strangways, MP.

== Career ==
He matriculated at Wadham College, Oxford (founded by the son of his ancestor John Wadham (d. 1578)) on 25 July 1655 and was a student of Lincoln's Inn in 1658. In 1661 he was elected a Member of Parliament for Bridport, Dorset, in the Cavalier Parliament. He was commissioner for assessment for Dorset from 1661 to 1674. In 1662 he was made a freeman of Lyme Regis. He succeeded his father in 1675 and in that year he became commissioner for recusants for Dorset 1675, colonel of the foot militia, Deputy Lieutenant and steward of the manors of Fordington and Ryme.

== Marriage and children ==
Strangways married twice but produced no issue:

- Firstly, on 4 July 1672, to Anne Capell, a daughter of Arthur Capell, 1st Baron Capell of Hadham by his wife Elizabeth Morrison (died 3 December 1675), childless.
- Secondly, on 13 March 1676, he married Mary Penruddock, a daughter of John Penruddock of Compton Chamberlayne, Wiltshire, and widow of William Jackman of Shroton, Dorset.

== Death and succession ==
Strangways died on 6 April 1676 at the age of 39, with no children, when his heirs became his brothers. Most of his estate, valued at £5,000 per annum, went to his next brother Thomas Strangways, with lands valued at £500 per annum going to Wadham Strangways.

Parliament of England
Preceded by John Drake; Henry Henley	Member of Parliament for Bridport; 1661–1676; With: Humphrey Bishop1661–1676	Succeeded by Wadham Strangways; George Bowerman
