= Thomas Gooch (artist) =

English artist (1750–1802)

Thomas Gooch (1750 – 1802) was an English artist who also specialised in painting animals, particularly dog and horse portraiture. No portraits of the artist survive.

== Life and work ==
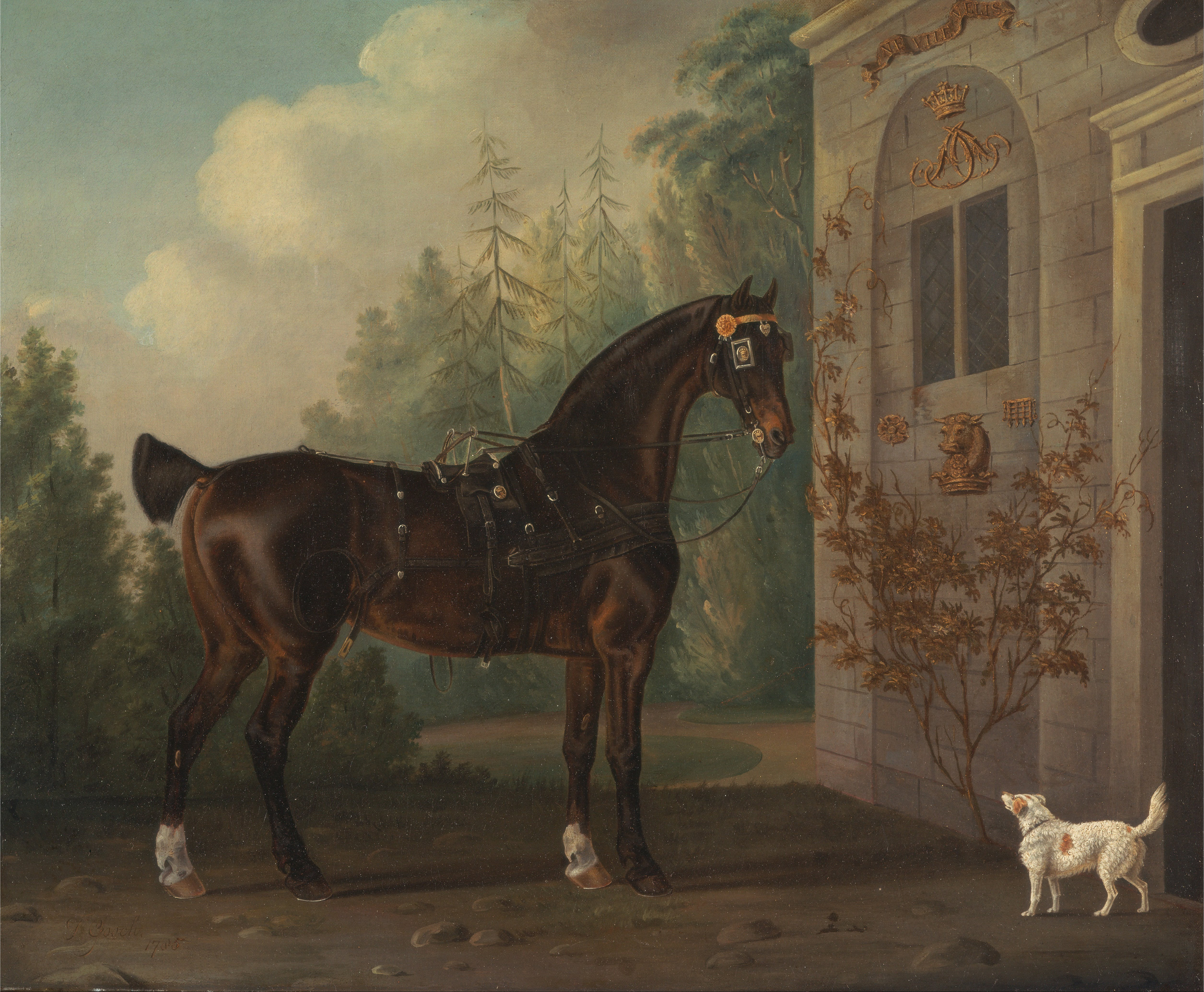
Lord Abergavenny's Dark Bay Carriage Horse with a Terrier

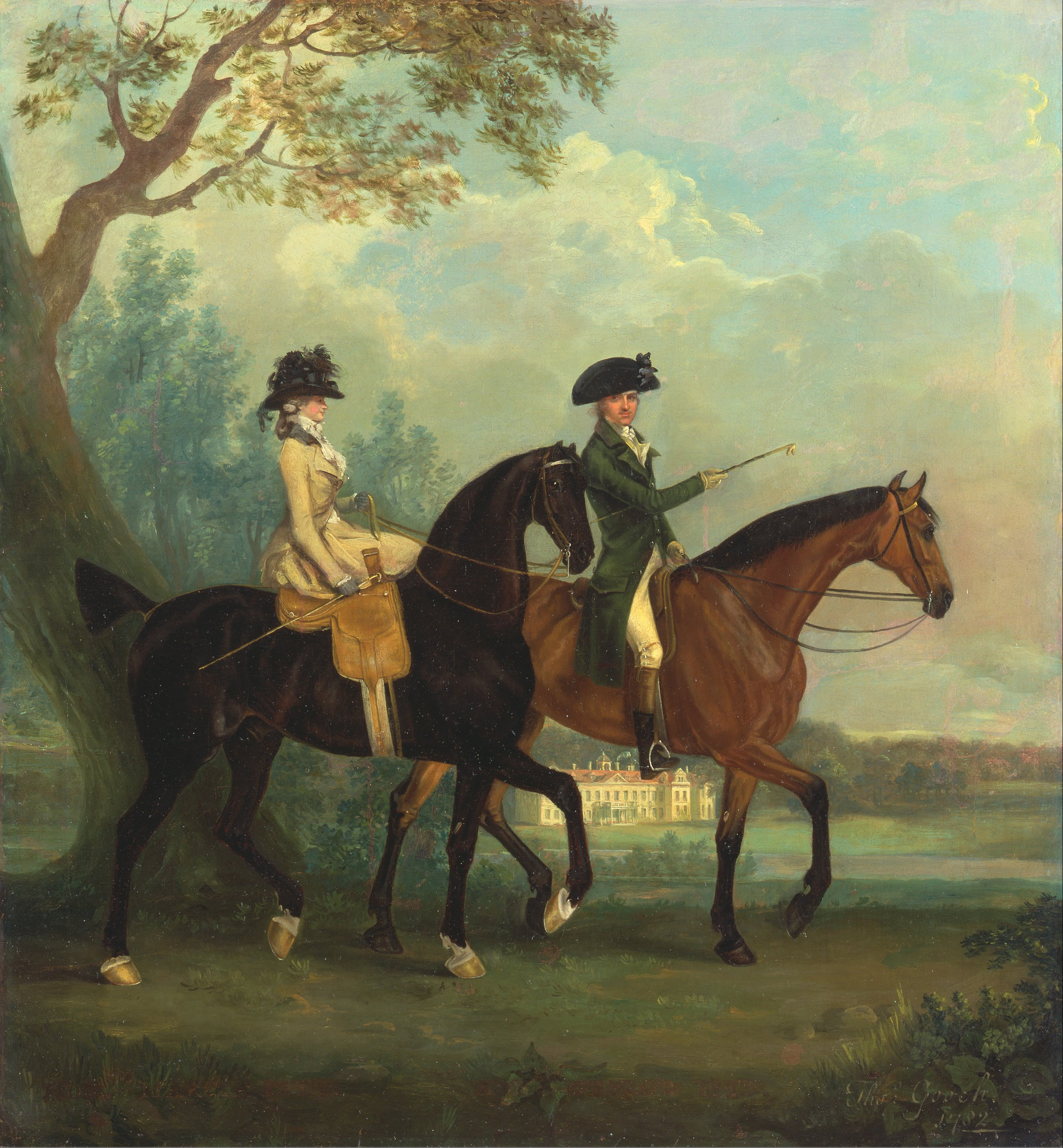
Marcia Pitt and Her Brother George Pitt, Later 2nd Baron Rivers, Riding in the Park at Stratfield Saye

Thomas Gooch was born in London circa 1750 where he lived for most of his life; he died at Lyndhurst, Hampshire in 1802. Details on his family life are scant.

More famous for his work depicting animals, Gooch did also paint images of those that owned the horses and dogs he more readily depicted. He famously carried out a study of the life of a racehorse as a set of six images, depicting the animal's misuse after a life of racing as a thoroughbred. The Life and Death of a Racehorse, completed in 1792 was a popular work and reproduced as aquatint prints and often accompanied with a thought-provoking text on animal cruelty.

Gooch was an artist who was popular with the landed gentry and prolific, exhibiting many times (76 paintings submitted) at the Royal Academy.
