= Wadham Strangways =

English politician (1646–1685)

Member of Parliament for Bridport
- In office February 1677 – August 1679

Personal details
- Born: 1646
- Died: 14 June 1685 (aged 39)
- Relations: Thomas Strangways I (brother); John Strangways (brother)
- Parent: Giles Strangways
- Education: Hertford College, Oxford

Wadham Strangways (1688 – 14 June 1685) was an English politician who was Member of Parliament (MP) for Bridport.

== Biography ==
Strangways was the brother of Thomas Strangways. He was killed at the Battle of Bridport.

== See also ==
- List of MPs elected to the English Parliament in 1661
