= Somerset Militia =

Auxiliary force of the British Army

The Somerset Militia was an auxiliary (Note: It is incorrect to describe the British Militia as 'irregular': throughout their history they were equipped and trained exactly like the line regiments of the regular army, and once embodied in time of war they were fulltime professional soldiers for the duration of their enlistment.) military force in the county of Somerset in South West England. From their formal organisation as Trained Bands in 1558 until their final service as the Special Reserve, the Militia regiments of the county carried out internal security and home defence duties in all of Britain's major wars. They saw active service during the Second Bishops' War, the English Civil War, the Monmouth Rebellion and the Second Boer War, and finally trained thousands of reinforcements during World War I. After a shadowy postwar existence they were formally disbanded in 1953.

== Early history ==
The English militia was descended from the Anglo-Saxon Fyrd, the military force raised from the freemen of the shires under command of their Sheriff. It continued under the Norman kings, and was reorganised under the Assizes of Arms of 1181 and 1252, and again by King Edward I's Statute of Winchester of 1285.

In 1296 Edward called out the horse and foot of Somerset and Dorset to defend their counties from the French while he was away campaigning in Scotland. In 1315 Sir John de Clyveden and Sir J. Dunmere were ordered to array the men of Somerset because of the Scots' invasion. In 1322 de Clyveden and others were ordered to raise 1000 footmen (later increased to 2000) from Somerset and Dorset for service against invading Scots and Baronial rebels that culminated in the Battle of Boroughbridge. Later that year de Clyveden was ordered to lead a small unit of armed footmen from the towns of Somerset to join the army at Newcastle upon Tyne. In 1326 Somerset and Dorset were ordered to levy 3000 archers, light cavalry and others for the defence of the realm. By now the infantry were mainly equipped with the English longbow. The usual shire contingent was divided into companies of roughly 100 men commanded by ductores or constables, and subdivided into platoons of 20 led by vintenars. Edward III called out the Somerset levies (500 archers) in 1333 for his campaign in Scotland that ended at the Battle of Halidon Hill, and again in 1335 when those actually sent comprised two ductores and eight vintenars with 151 archers, of whom 55 were Mounted infantry. In 1539 King Henry VIII held a Great Muster of all the counties, recording the number of armed men available in each hundred, but the lists are incomplete for Somerset.

== Somerset Trained Bands ==
The legal basis of the militia was updated by two acts of 1557 covering musters (4 & 5 Ph. & M. c. 3) and the maintenance of horses and armour (4 & 5 Ph. & M. c. 2). The county militia was now under the Lord Lieutenant, assisted by the Deputy Lieutenants and Justices of the Peace (JPs). The entry into force of these Acts in 1558 is seen as the starting date for the organised county militia in England. In that year Somerset had an organised regiment of 1000 men in 10 companies. In 1569 the Somerset contingent joined the force assembled against the Rising of the North. Although the militia obligation was universal, this assembly confirmed that it was impractical to train and equip every able-bodied man, so after 1572 the practice was to select a proportion of men for the Trained Bands, who were mustered for regular training. During the Armada Crisis of 1588 Somerset furnished 4000 armed and trained foot in five regiments, together with 360 horse and 1000 untrained 'pioneers'.

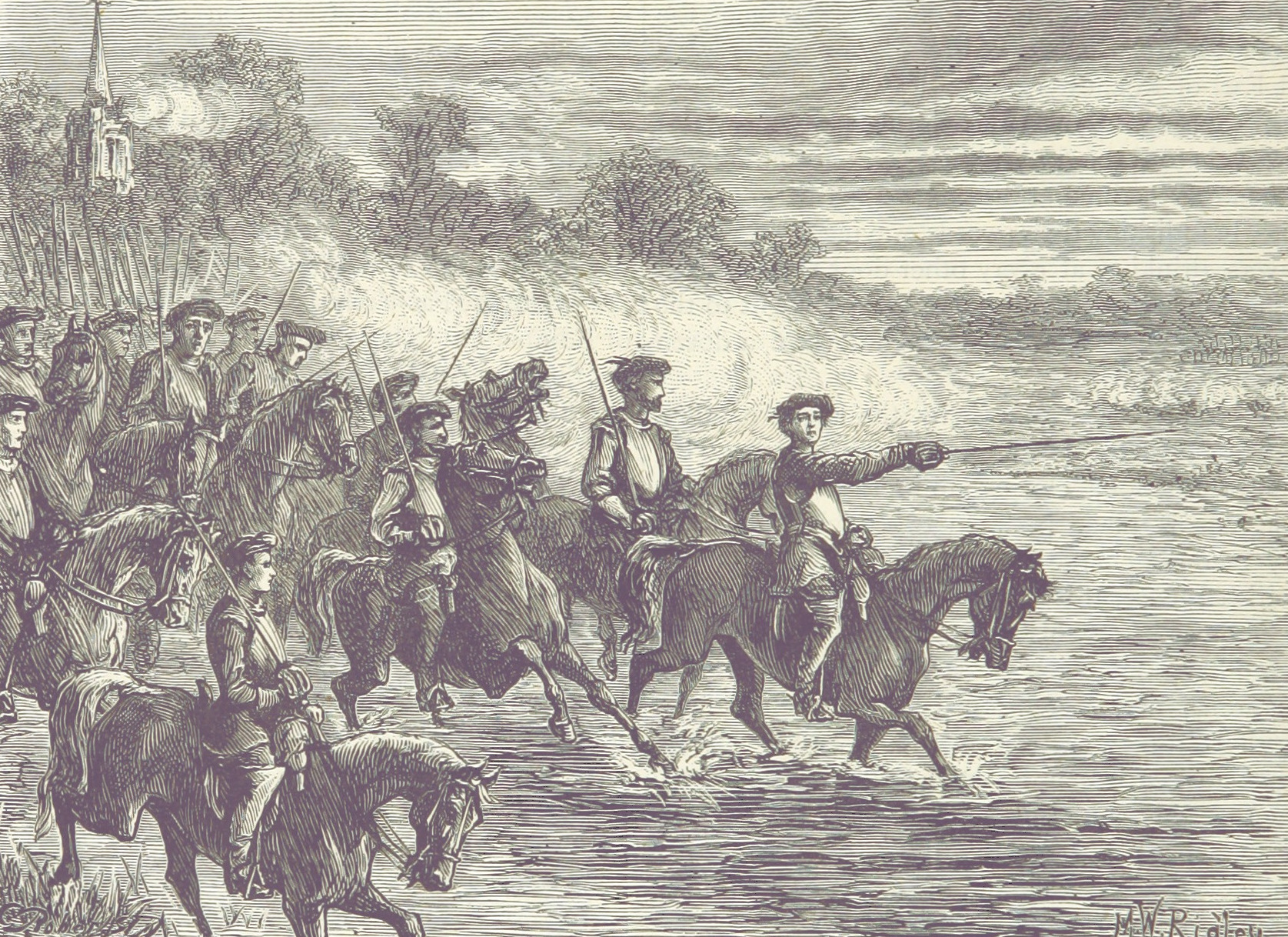
The Battle of Newburn, at which 800 Somerset militiamen fought in

With the passing of the threat of invasion, the trained bands declined in the early 17th Century. Later, King Charles I attempted to reform them into a national force or 'Perfect Militia' answering to the king rather than local control. The Somerset Trained Bands of 1638 again consisted of 4000 men in five regiments of foot and 300 troopers in a regiment of horse. Of these, Somerset was ordered to send 2000 men for the Second Bishops' War of 1640. However, many of those sent on this unpopular service would have been untrained replacements and conscripts: like many other contingents, the Somerset men were disorderly, accused of being 'West Country clownes'. At the Battle of Newburn, roughly 800 raw Somerset musketeers held hurriedly-erected breastworks or 'sconces' on the bank of the River Tyne. They drove off a Scottish cavalry probe but were then subjected to an intense cannonade and eventually broke and ran.

Control of the militia was one of the areas of dispute between Charles I and Parliament that led to the English Civil War. When open war broke out between the King and Parliament, the Somerset Trained Bands were split, some regiments serving on either side in the skirmishes and small sieges that characterised the early fighting in the West Country. As Parliament tightened its grip on the country after winning the First Civil War it reorganised the militia to counterbalance the power of the Army. The Somerset Militia now comprised two regiments each of horse and foot. The establishment of The Protectorate saw Oliver Cromwell take control of the militia as a paid force to support his Rule by Major-Generals. From now on the term 'Trained Band' began to be replaced by 'Militia'.

== Restoration Militia ==
Following the Stuart Restoration, the English Militia was re-established by the Militia Act 1661 under the control of the king's lords-lieutenant, the men to be selected by ballot. This was popularly seen as the 'Constitutional Force' to counterbalance a 'Standing Army' tainted by association with the New Model Army that had supported Cromwell's military dictatorship, and almost the whole burden of home defence and internal security was entrusted to the militia under politically reliable local landowners. The militia were frequently called out during the reign of King Charles II; for example, the Somersets were alerted in 1666 because of a Dutch invasion threat. Their duties also included suppressing non-conformist religious assemblies (of which there were many in the West Country) under the Conventicle Act 1664. Lieutenant Edward Phelips of the Somerset Militia Horse (later Colonel Sir Edward Phelips) gained a reputation for harshness in carrying out this duty.

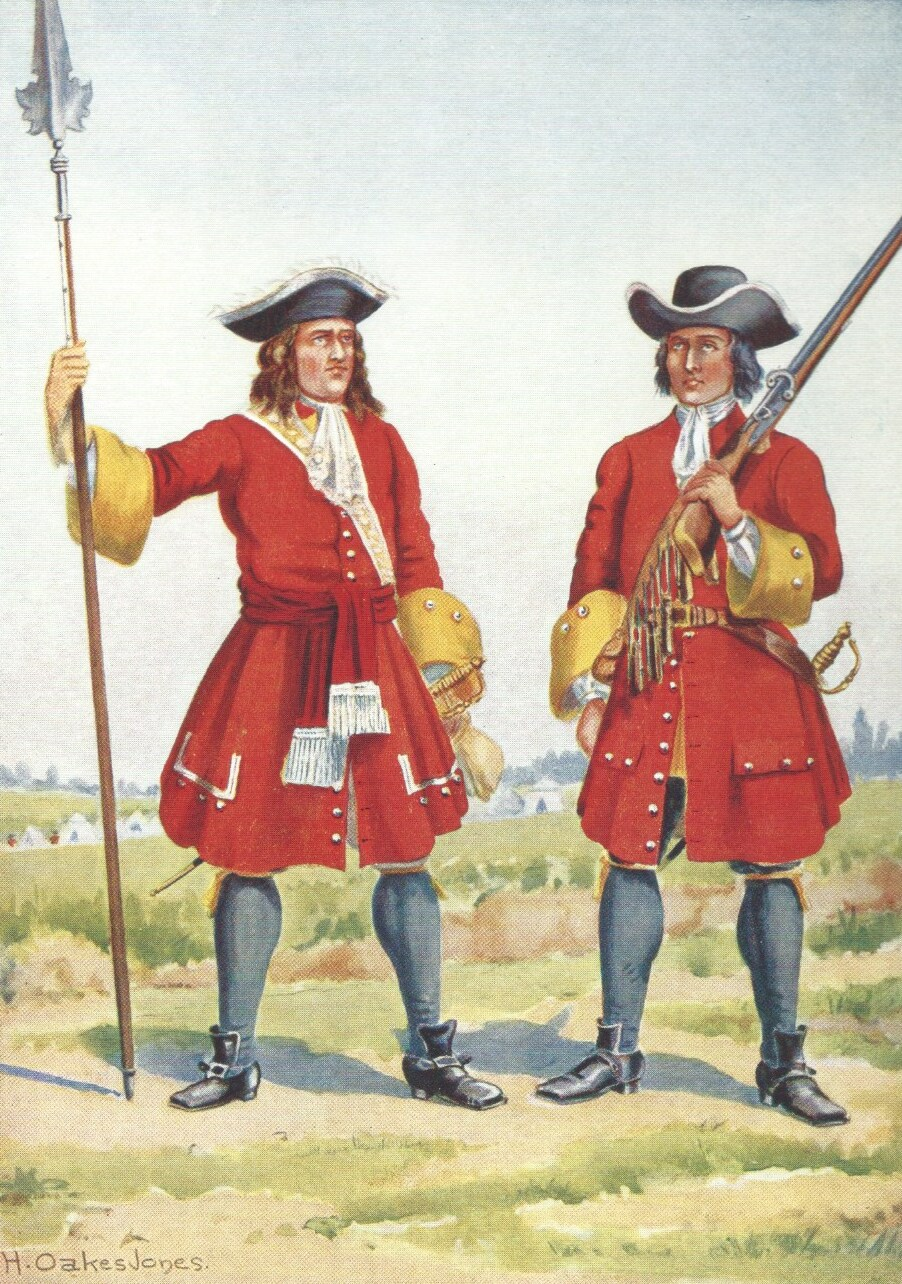
A sergeant and private of the Somerset Militia in 1685

By 1679 the Somerset Militia (4405 men) was organised in five regiments of foot, each of eight companies, and one regiment of horse in five troops, all the regiments being commanded by Members of Parliament:

- The Lord Lieutenant's, The Earl of Winchilsea's Regiment (792 men)
- Sir Edward Phelips' Regiment (903 men)
- Col Ralph Stawell's Regiment (830 men) – the Bridgwater Regiment
- Col Edward Berkeley's Regiment (820 men)
- Sir Haswell Tynte's Regiment (800 men)
- Viscount Fitzhardinge's Regiment of Horse (260 men)

=== Monmouth Rebellion ===
In 1685 there was a rebellion against King James II. Its leader, the exiled Duke of Monmouth, landed with his supporters at Lyme Regis in Dorset on 11 June 1685. He chose to begin his campaign in the West Country because of the level of support he expected in that strongly Protestant region, where economic recession was hurting the weavers and clothiers. As his rebels mustered the government of James II responded by declaring him a traitor and calling out the militia while the regulars of the Royal army were assembled. The Somerset Militia's mustering towns were Bath, Bridgwater, Crewkerne, Taunton and Wells, and for this campaign the regiments were organised as follows:

- Sir William Portman's Regiment – the Yellow Regiment
- Sir Edward Phelips' Regiment
- Lord Stawell's Regiment – the Bridgwater Regiment
- Col Edward Berkeley's Regiment – the Wells Regiment?
- Col Francis Luttrell's Regiment – the Taunton Regiment
- The Somerset Militia mustered in the Yeovil and Crewkerne division, possibly including the horse, appear to have been commanded by Col William Helyar

The colonels of the Somerset Militia had been alerted by the royal officials fleeing from Lyme even before the orders arrived from London, and they mustered their men quickly, Phelips' and Luttrell's regiments marching out from Taunton on 14 June. However, the Lord Lieutenant of Somerset, the young Duke of Somerset, was uninterested in military matters and somewhat lax, and left the regiments without orders. Some of them had also had not been paid, leading to resentment. Sir Edward Phelips, on the other hand, had a reputation as a martinet and for training his men hard, leading to unpopularity. The morale of the Somerset Militia was consequently low.

On 15 June Luttrell was marching from Crewkerne with his own regiment, some of Phelips', and a troop of horse, to rendezvous with the Devon Militia at Axminster. But advancing from Lyme, Monmouth was able to seize Axminster before either militia force arrived, driving out the scouts of the Somerset Militia Horse. There was a brief fight around the town and the Devons withdrew westwards in accordance with their orders. The Somersets withdrew towards Taunton, but some of the men broke and ran, one writing that 'fear gripped our ranks and most were driven off backward'. The rebels picked up some discarded militia coats and weapons as they followed up, but 'nothing very much happened'. The historian Lord Macaulay inflated this hurried retreat into a fullscale rout, with the countryside being strewn with abandoned weapons and uniforms. Macaulay has been followed uncritically by many authors, but modern historians find no evidence for a rout: the militia retained their baggage and colours and remained a formed body. Nevertheless, some of the Somerset Militia did desert and join the rebel duke – Phelips, who was not present at the action at Axminster, told Col Berkeley that most of his and Luttrell's men went over to the rebels. Stawell's Regiment was at Taunton: when the retreating men of Phelips' and Luttrell's arrived, the whole force marched off hurriedly, leaving its ammunition. The rest of Phelips' regiment had already retired towards Chard. The Somersets were ordered to rendezvous at Bridgwater next day, but apparently did not do so.

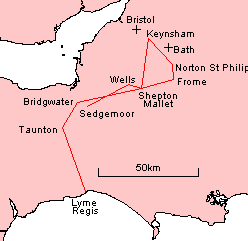
Monmouth's route.

Monmouth had been correct in the support he received from the West Country people, at least among skilled workers and tradesmen, and as he advanced he was welcomed into Chard, Ilminster, Taunton and Bridgwater, gaining numerous recruits. Numbers of the militiamen scattered after Axminster also rallied to him. He then marched towards his next objective, the port of Bristol.

The Duke of Somerset had panicked on receiving the news from Axminster, exaggerating the dispersion of his men. He was ordered to leave a garrison at Bath and fall back to Bristol with the remainder (presumably from Berkeley's and Portman's regiments), destroying the bridge at Keynsham, which he failed to do completely. This allowed the rebels to cross the Avon into Gloucestershire, though they were hindered by bad weather and retired in the face of the advancing Gloucestershire Militia and Royal forces.

In fact, after their retreat from Axminster the Somerset force had quickly reassembled ('they soon came to their arms and so we retreated', Phelips wrote), and fell back towards Bruton. They now barred the way for Monmouth to enter south-aast Somerset, while the detachment securing Bath, with its bridge over the Avon and control of the Great West Road from London, was reinforced by the Wiltshire and Oxfordshire Militia. To the south the Berkshire and Hampshire Militia prevented Monmouth from advancing against the Royal army's communications to London, Finally the Devon and Dorset Militia reoccupied Lyme and Taunton behind Monmouth, hemming him into north-west Somerset, and preventing potential recruits from joining him. A party of the Somerset Militia Horse was in action alongside the regulars in a skirmish at Ashill on 19 June and in patrol actions elsewhere.

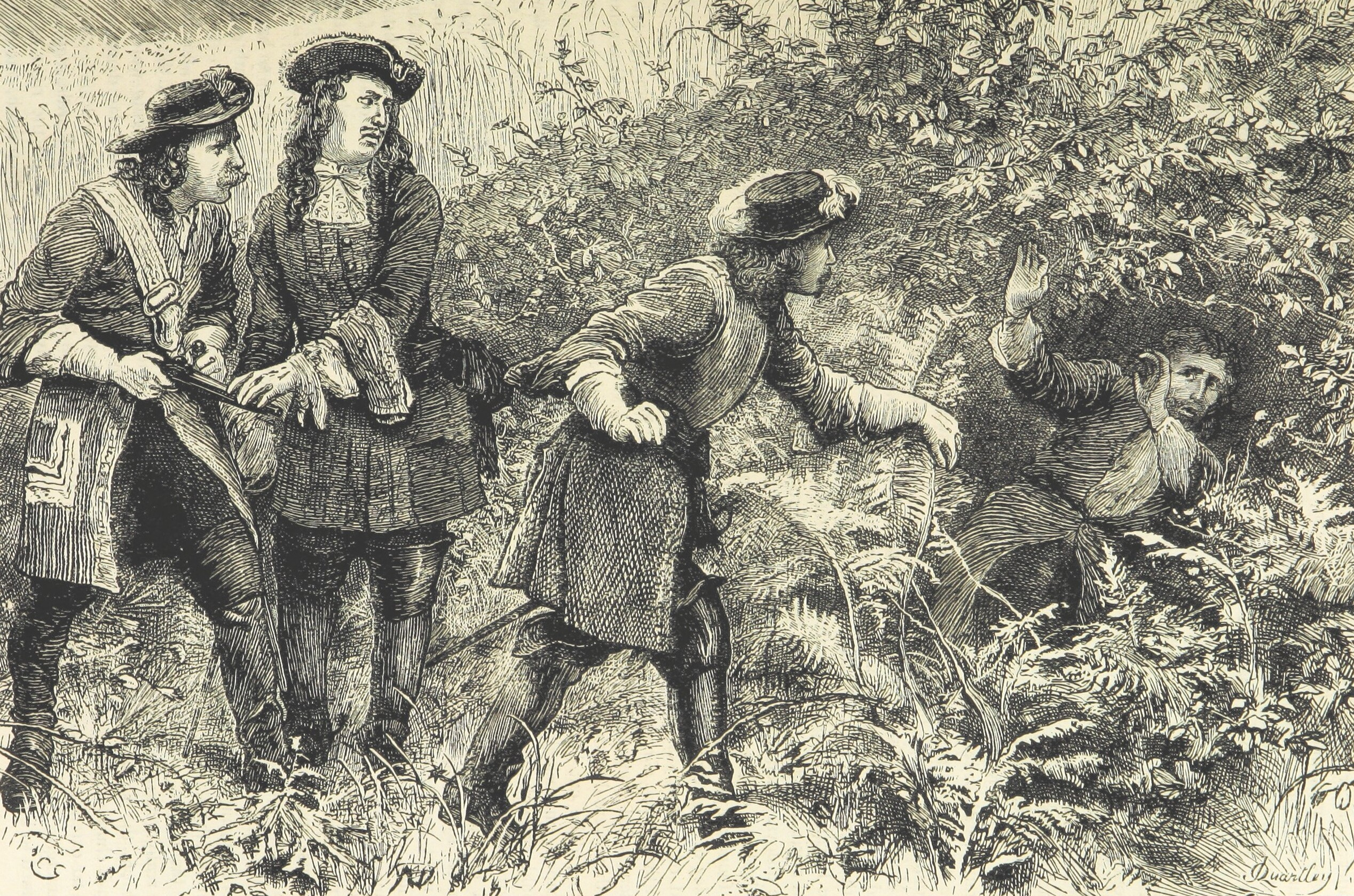
1873 illustration of Monmouth's capture

Monmouth withdrew to Bridgwater as the Royal forces closed in. On the night of 5/6 July he launched a desperate attack on their camp (the Battle of Sedgemoor), but his scratch forces were destroyed by the regulars. After Sedgemoor, Portman's Yellow Regiment formed a chain of outposts from north Dorset to the sea, and it claimed that it was a detachment of this regiment that captured Monmouth hiding in a ditch on the Dorset–Hampshire border. Afterwards the Yellow Regiment was allowed to use Monmouth's heraldic crest as a badge, a privilege that was later exercised by the 1st Somerset Militia. It was actually a patrol of the Sussex Militia that captured the Duke hiding near Blandford Forum, though Portman was present and ensured that the duke was taken alive.

Four days after Sedgemoor King James ordered the militia to be stood down across the country, but those of the West Country still had work to do in hunting down rebels and pacifying the countryside. The most detailed account of the militia in this campaign contends that James II deliberately belittled their performance to play down Monmouth's skill and to bolster his own plans for a large army under his own control. After the suppression of the rebellion he suspended militia musters and planned to use the counties' weapons and militia taxes to equip and pay his expanding Regular Army, which he felt he could rely upon, unlike the locally commanded militia.

=== After Sedgemoor ===
The West Country militia was not mustered for training in 1687, and was not embodied when William of Orange made his landing in the West Country in 1688 (the Glorious Revolution). However, Francis Luttrell and his family raised a regiment for William of Orange in three days – this later became the 19th Foot.

The militia was restored to its former position under William III. In August 1690 the Somerset Militia were ordered to send two regiments of foot and two troops of horse to defend Exeter against a threatened French attack. A full return of the English Militia was compiled for the 1697 muster. The Somerset Militia (3703 men) was organised as follows under the Duke of Ormond as Lord Lieutenant:

- Col Nathaniel Palmer's Regiment of Horse, 5 Troops (from Bridgwater, Wells, Bath, Crewkerne and Taunton) (269 men)
- Bridgwater Regiment, Col Sir John Trevelyan, 2nd Baronet (724 men)
- Wells Regiment, Col Edward Berkeley (726 men)
- Bath Regiment (547 men) – the Blue Regiment
- Crewkerne Regiment, Col Namy Henly (787 men)
- Taunton Regiment, Col Sir Francis Warre, 1st Baronet (650 men)

The regiments of foot were each of eight companies, raised from a 'Division' of eight or nine of the Hundreds.

However, the Militia passed into virtual abeyance during the long peace after the Treaty of Utrecht in 1712, and few were called out during the Jacobite Risings of 1715 and 1745.

== 1757 Reforms ==
Under threat of French invasion during the Seven Years' War a series of Militia Acts from 1757 reorganised the county militia regiments, the men being conscripted by means of parish ballots (paid substitutes were permitted) to serve for three years. In peacetime they assembled for 28 days' annual training. There was a property qualification for officers, who were commissioned by the lord lieutenant. An adjutant and drill sergeants were to be provided to each regiment from the Regular Army, and arms and accoutrements would be supplied when the county had secured 60 per cent of its quota of recruits.

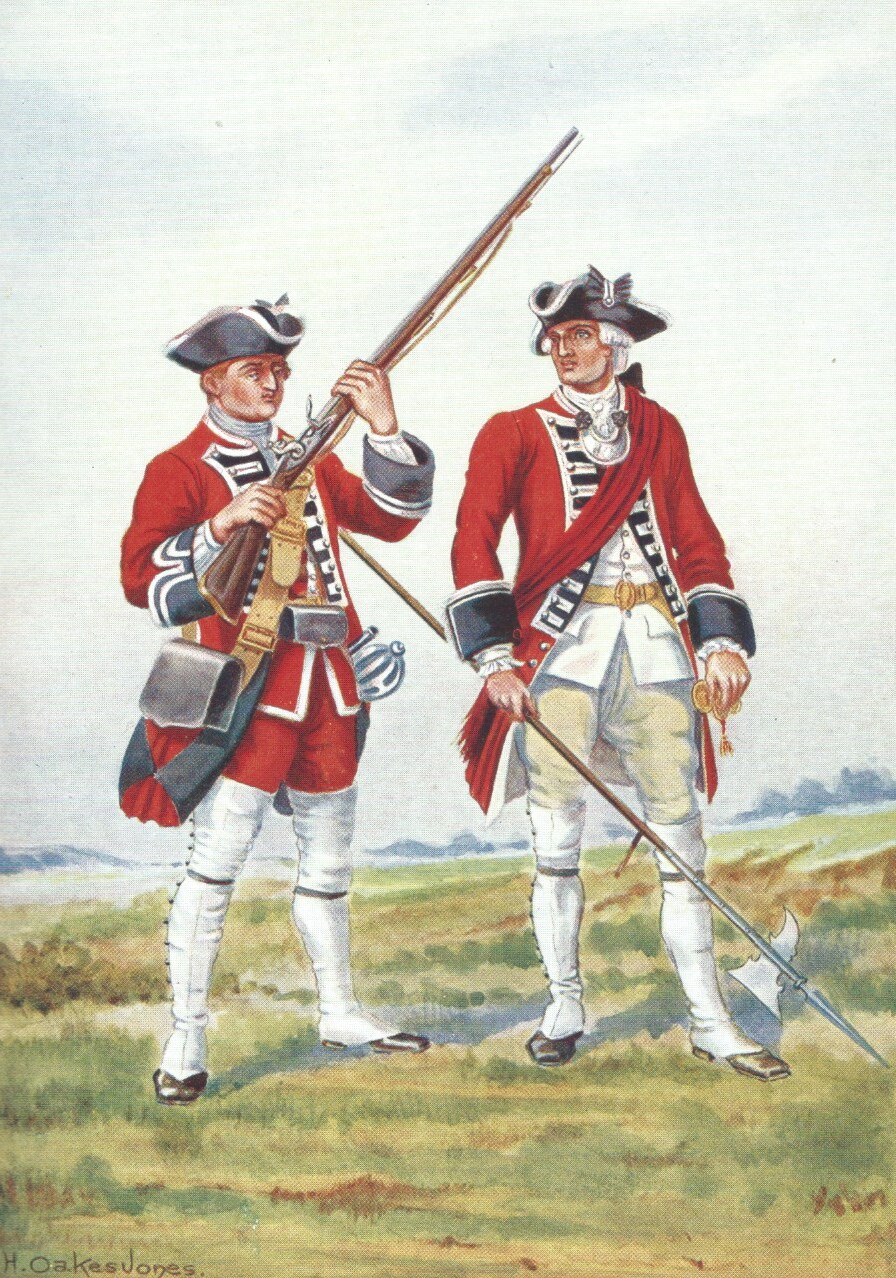
A private and sergeant of the Somerset Militia in 1759

Somerset's quota was set at 840 men in two regiments, each of seven companies. The Lord Lieutenant of Somerset, Earl Poulett, was an enthusiast for the militia, but even he was slow to act, finding the Somerset gentry averse, and the 'common people outrageously against it' for fear of being 'Digby'd abroad' (Lord Digby had recently raised a regular regiment in Somerset and Dorset for home service but the men had been forcibly sent overseas). In 1758 Poulett tried to recruit officers, but the first lieutenancy meeting was a failure with only eight persons putting themselves forward out of 40 required. Poulett then began a publicity campaign, giving a rousing speech and having copies of it circulated. He proposed taking the colonelcies of both regiments himself, and appointed senior officers from across the political spectrum. By January 1759 he had obtained almost all the officers and the balloting and enrolment of the other ranks began. The 1st Somerset Militia was formed at Taunton, the 2nd at Bath, and both received their arms on 22 March 1759. They were both embodied for fulltime service on 3 July 1759.

Over the following years the Somerset regiments saw service in the Plymouth garrison, in Surrey and elsewhere on home defence duties, and guarded prisoners-of-war at Exeter and Bristol. The regiments were ordered to disembody on 30 December 1762, shortly before hostilities were ended by the Treaty of Paris. The officers and men of the Somersets left so quickly that it was difficult to settle up the regimental accounts. In 1763 the disembodied Somerset militia regiments were reorganised into a single regiment of 12 companies, and the 2nd Somerset Militia ceased to exist for the next 35 years.

=== American War of Independence ===
The American War of Independence broke out in 1775, and by 1778 Britain was threatened with invasion by the Americans' allies, France and Spain. The militia were called out, and the Somerset regiment assembled on 13 April. In June the regiment left for duty at Plymouth, where among other duties it guarded American prisoners-of-war. During the summer of 1779 the Somerset Militia was at Coxheath Camp near Maidstone in Kent, which was the army's largest training camp, where the militia were exercised as part of a division alongside regular troops while providing a reserve in case of French invasion of South East England. After spending the winter quartered in Berkshire the Somersets returned to Plymouth in 1780, where they were embroiled in a serious riot with the Brecknockshire Militia. Despite this the regiment returned to the Plymouth garrison during the following two summers. The Somerset Militia was in winter quarters across its home county when the warrant for disembodying the militia was issued in February 1783, a draft peace treaty having been agreed the previous November. The regiment was disembodied at Taunton on 14 March.

From 1784 to 1792 the militia ballot was used to keep up the numbers of the disembodied militia, but to save money only two-thirds of the men were actually mustered for annual training. The Somersets were not actually assembled for training until 1787, when it was held at Wells and in each of the following years.

=== French Revolutionary Wars ===
The militia was already being embodied when Revolutionary France declared war on Britain on 1 February 1793. The warrant for calling out the Somerset Militia was received on 8 January and the regiment assembled at Wells on 29 January. The French Revolutionary Wars saw a new phase for the English militia: they were embodied for a whole generation, and became regiments of full-time professional soldiers (though restricted to service in the British Isles), which the regular army increasingly saw as a prime source of recruits. They served in coast defences, manning garrisons, guarding prisoners of war, and for internal security, while their traditional local defence duties were taken over by the Volunteers and mounted Yeomanry.

The Somerset Militia spent the summer of 1793 in Cornwall, helping to suppress riots among the tin miners, then wintered at Salisbury. In 1794–5 it was part of the garrison of Dover Castle then spent the summer of 1795 with a militia brigade camped on Barham Downs in Kent. After wintering in Canterbury it moved to Colchester, and from October 1796 was stationed at Yarmouth, including duty on the coastal guns.

=== Supplementary Militia ===
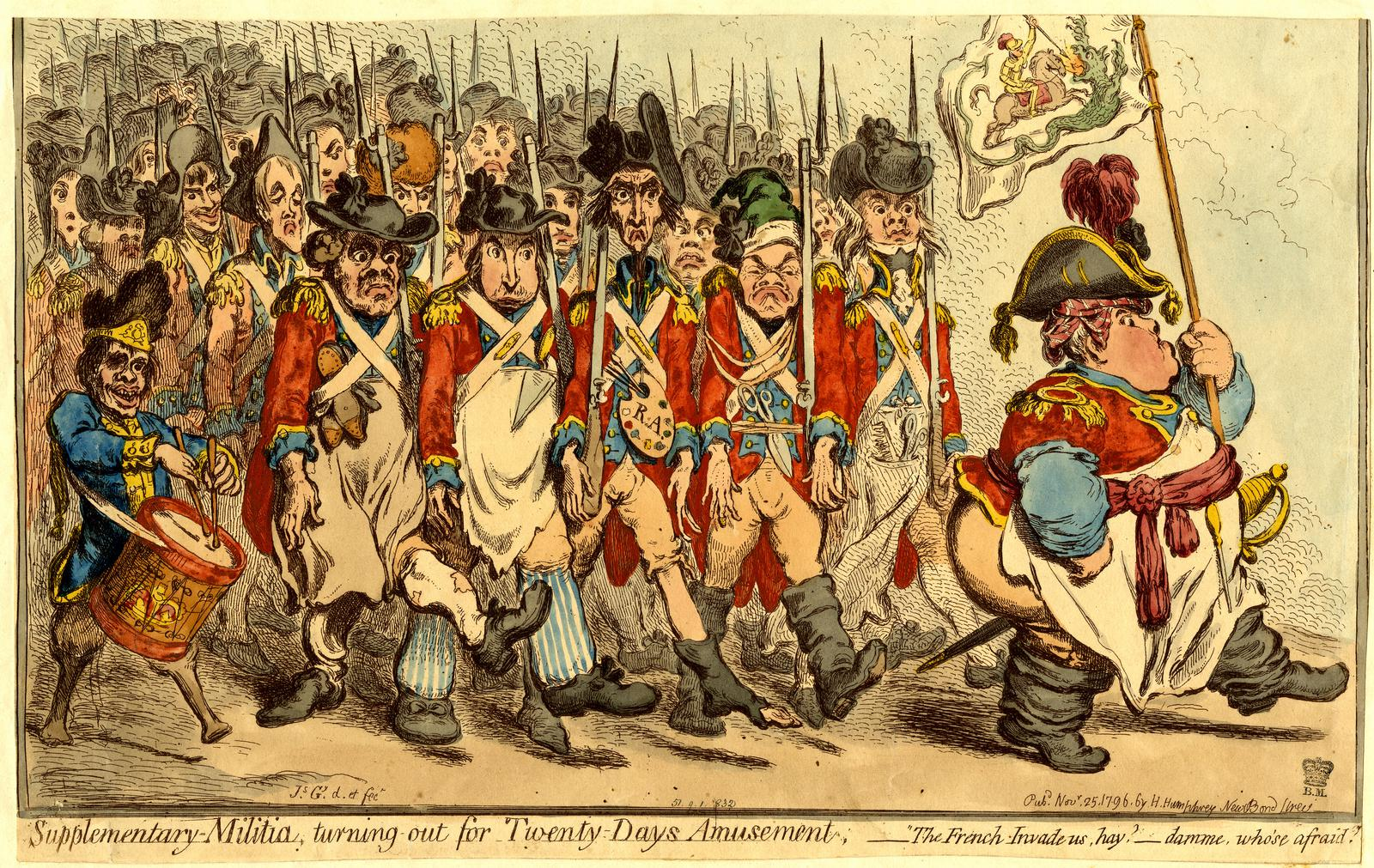
1796 caricature of the Supplementary Militia by James Gillray

In an attempt to have as many men as possible under arms for home defence in order to release regulars, in 1796 the Government created the Supplementary Militia, a compulsory levy of men to be trained for 20 days a year in their spare time, and to be incorporated in the Regular Militia in emergency. Somerset's new quota was fixed at 2960 men, and two additional battalions ('Eastern' and 'Western') were embodied from these men as well as bringing the 1st up to full strength. The supplementaries were trained by detachments from the 1st Somerset, and the two embodied battalions were later designated the 2nd and 3rd Somerset. The 3rd Somerset militia was short-lived, disappearing about 1799.

By the summer of 1798 both the 1st and 2nd Somerset Militia were serving in the coast defences of South West England, with their 'flank' companies detached to serve in composite Grenadier and Light Battalions. The invasion threat having receded, the militia was reduced in 1799, the surplus men being encouraged to volunteer for the Regular Army: the 1st Somerset provided for officers and 260 men who preferred army life to 'hard labour and poor living' as civilians.

The 1st Somerset spent the summers of 1799 and 1800 doing duty at Weymouth, where King George III was in residence. The following year some of the militiamen who had been stood down in 1799 were re-embodied to bring the regiments back to full strength. After being stationed in Hampshire the regiment was marched back to Somerset in November 1801. Hostilities ended with the Treaty of Amiens on 27 March 1802, and the militia were disembodied.

=== Napoleonic Wars ===
However, the Peace of Amiens was short-lived and Britain declared war on France once more in May 1803. The 1st and 2nd Somerset Militia had already been embodied in March and were brought up to a higher establishment by supplementaries in June. Both regiments did duty in South West England and both were at Weymouth for the summer of 1804 when the Royal Family was again in residence. In the autumn of 1805 the two regiments were part of a militia brigade at Silverhill, East Sussex.

=== Somerset Local Militia ===
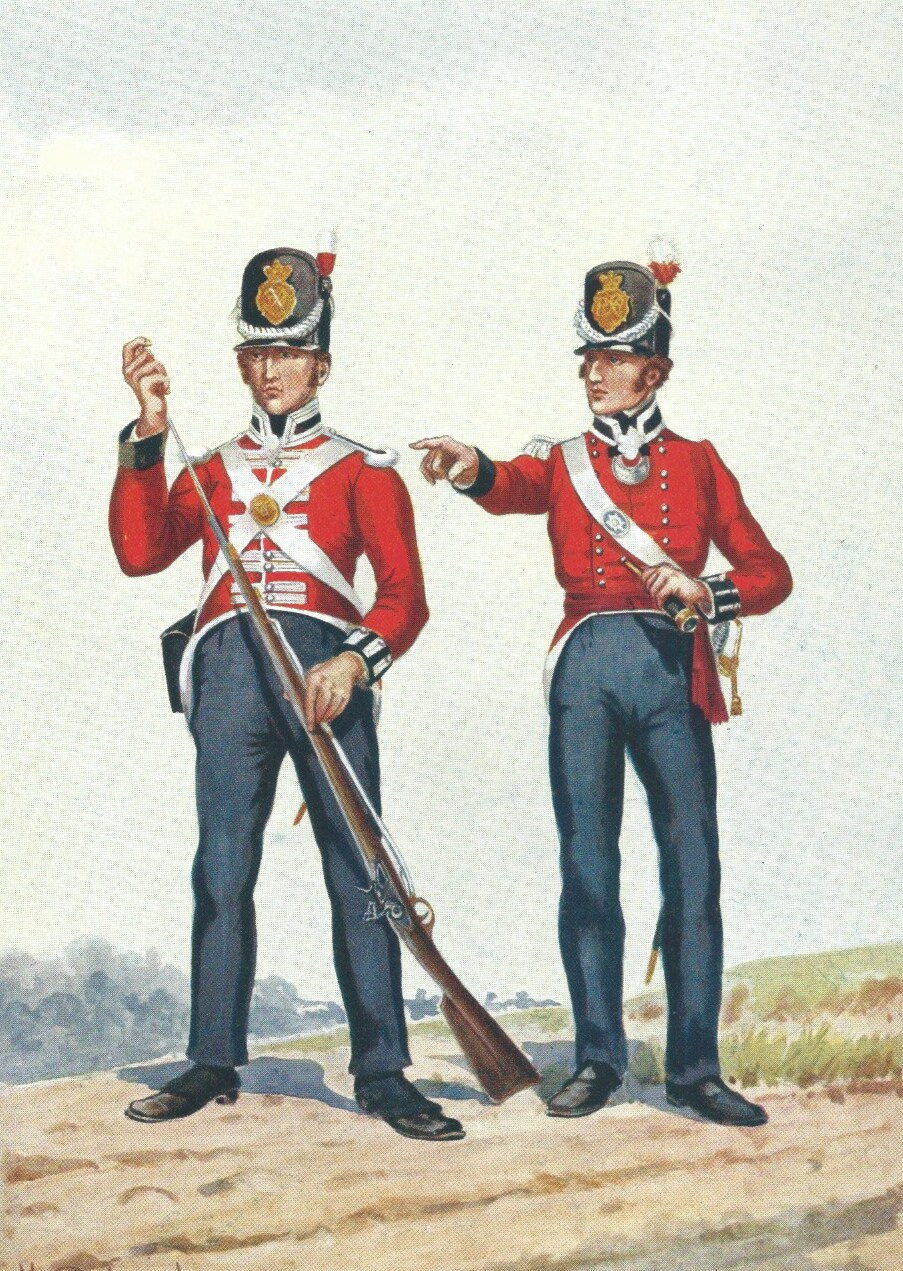
A Somerset Militia private and lieutenant between 1812–1816

While the Regular Militia were the mainstay of national defence during the Revolutionary and Napoleonic Wars, they were supplemented from 1808 by the Local Militia, which were part-time and only to be used within their own districts. These were raised to counter the declining numbers of Volunteers, and if their ranks could not be filled voluntarily the Militia Ballot was employed. Many of the remaining Volunteer units transferred en masse to the Local Militia, and the rest were disbanded. Instructors were provided by the Regular Militia. Somerset's Local Militia quota was assessed at over 6000 men, organised into seven regiments:

- Bridgwater Local Militia
- East Somerset Local Militia - including the Horsington Company of Volunteers
- West Somerset Local Militia, commanded by Lt-Col John Hulton, later lt-col of the 1st Somerset Militia
- Polden Hill Local Militia, commanded by Lt-Col Henry Bull Strangways, formerly of the Polden Hill Volunteers
- Highbridge Local Militia
- East Mendip Local Militia
- West Mendip Local Militia

The local militia suffered from disciplinary problems and at the annual training in 1810, there were serious disturbances in the West Mendip Local Militia at Bath.

The 1st Somerset Militia, which was stationed in Bristol and Exeter in 1808, and then in Plymouth until 1813, provided training teams for the Polden Hill Local Militia, and probably other units. The local Militia was stood down in 1815 and disbanded in 1816.

=== Ireland and Dartmoor ===
The Interchange Act 1811 allowed English militia regiments to serve in Ireland and vice versa for periods of two years. The 1st and 2nd Somerset both volunteered, the 2nd serving there from June 1813, the 1st from January 1814. Napoleon abdicated in April 1814 and in September the English militia regiments in Ireland were ordered back to their home counties to be disembodied. The 2nd did so, but on arrival at Taunton in October the 1st were told that the order to disembody had been countermanded. The War of 1812 had not yet ended and the regiment was sent back to Dartmoor to guard American prisoners-of-war. In April 1815 there was a serious riot, with the militia guards opening fire, leading to several deaths and numerous wounded. In the same month Napoleon returned from Elba, sparking off the short Waterloo campaign. The 1st Somerset continued in service until January 1816, but although some of the militia regiments that had been disembodied were called out again, the 2nd Somerset was not among them.

=== Long peace ===
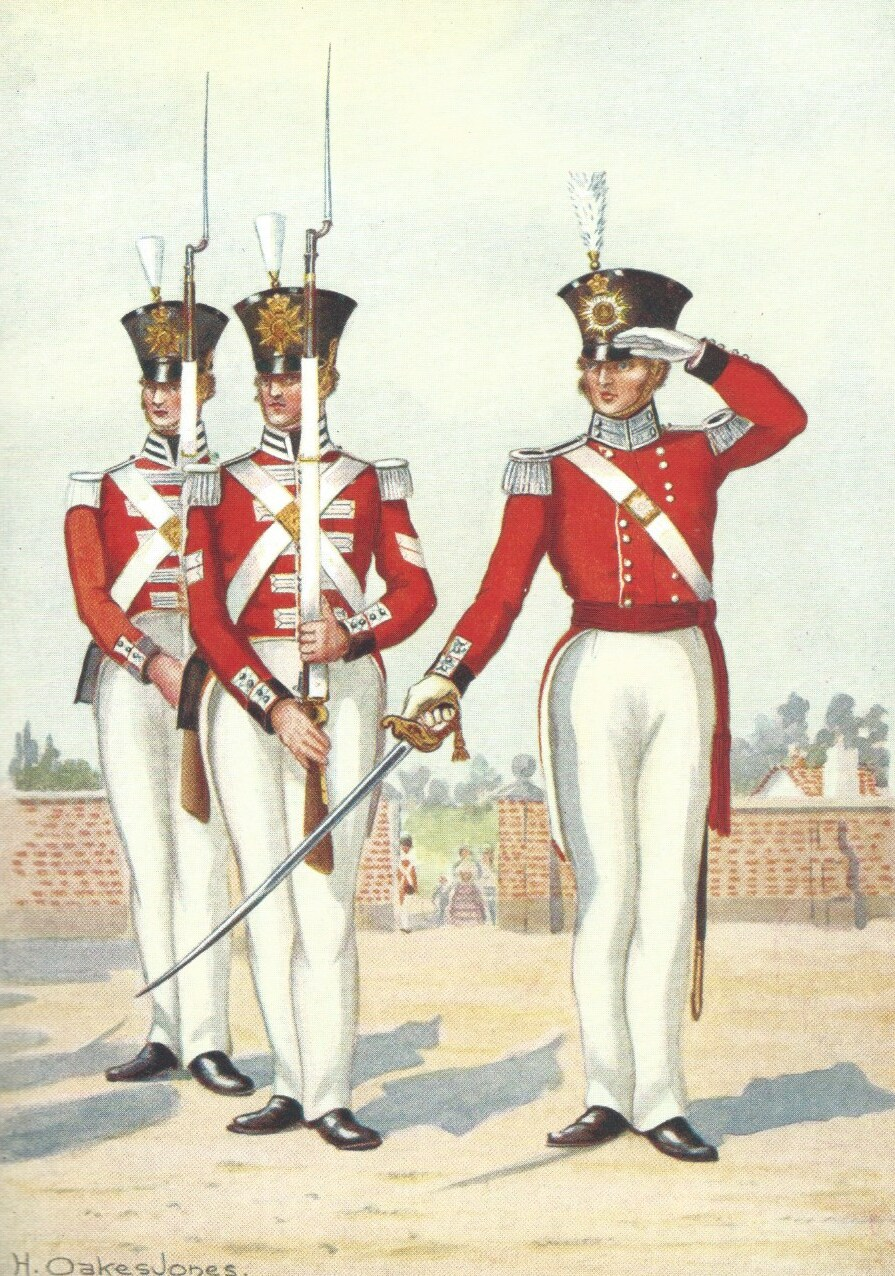
A private, corporal and captain of the Somerset Militia in 1831

After Waterloo there was another long peace. Although officers continued to be commissioned into the militia and ballots were still held until they were suspended by the Militia Act 1829, the regiments were rarely assembled for training (and not at all after 1831). The permanent staffs of sergeants and drummers (who were occasionally used to maintain public order) were progressively reduced.

== 1852 Reforms ==
The Militia of the United Kingdom was revived by the Militia Act 1852, enacted during a renewed period of international tension. As before, units were raised and administered on a county basis, and filled by voluntary enlistment (although conscription by means of the Militia Ballot might be used if the counties failed to meet their quotas). Training was for 56 days on enlistment, then for 21–28 days per year, during which the men received full army pay. Under the Act, militia units could be embodied by Royal Proclamation for full-time home defence service in three circumstances:

1. 'Whenever a state of war exists between Her Majesty and any foreign power'.
2. 'In all cases of invasion or upon imminent danger thereof'.
3. 'In all cases of rebellion or insurrection'.

The 1st and 2nd Somerset Militia were both revived in 1852, with younger officers promoted or appointed.

=== Crimean War and after ===
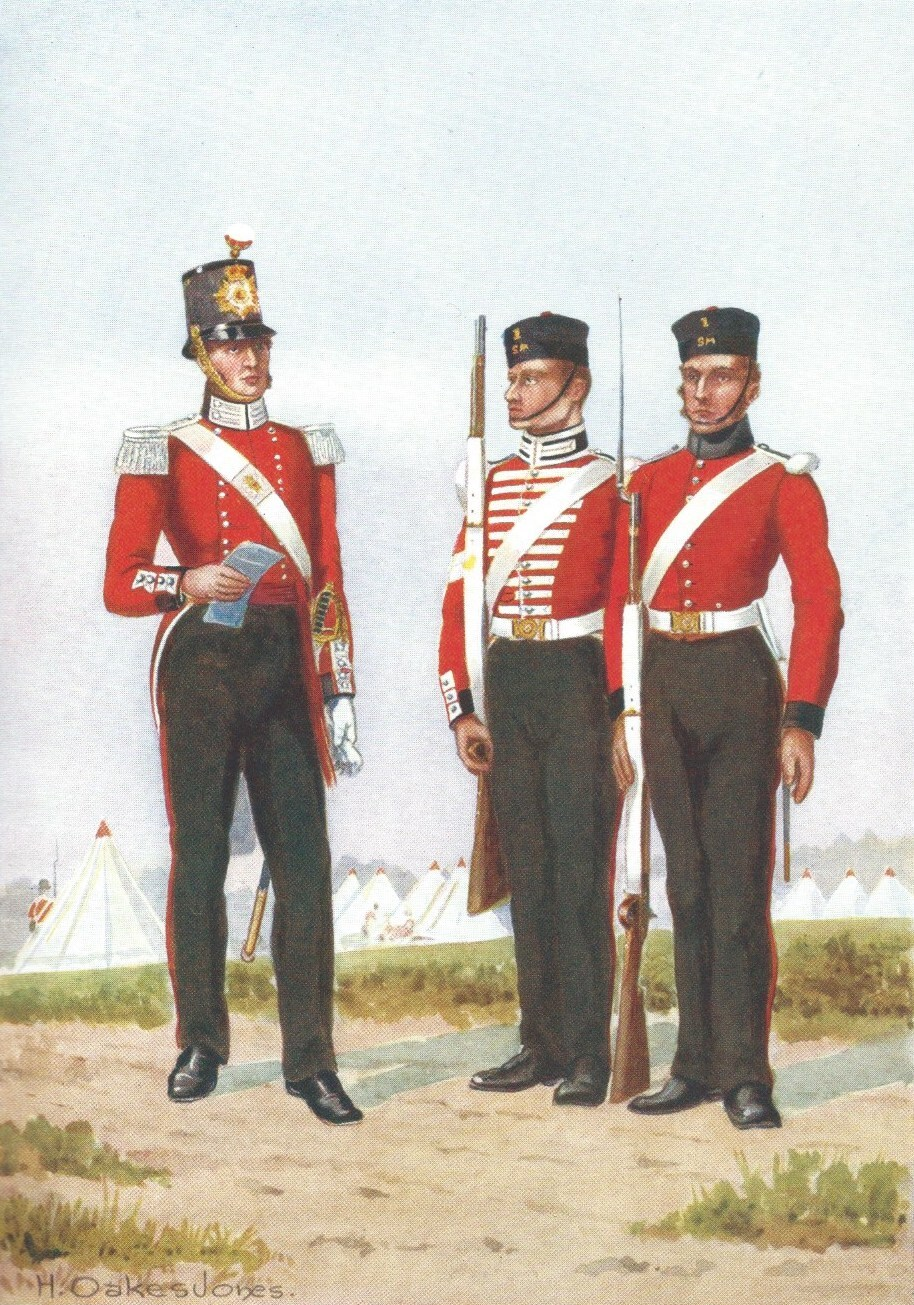
A captain, corporal and private of the Somerset Militia in 1854

War having broken out with Russia in 1854 and an expeditionary force sent to the Crimea, the militia began to be called out for home defence. The 1st Somersets were embodied on 2 May 1854 and served at Plymouth, Taunton, and Aldershot Camp. The 2nd Somersets were embodied on 25 September 1854 and sent to Ireland, serving at Cork and Dublin. The war ended in March 1856 with the Treaty of Paris and both regiments were disembodied later that year. Unlike some other militia units, neither Somerset regiment was embodied during the Indian Mutiny.

Thereafter, annual training (21 or 27 days) was carried out each year. The Militia Reserve introduced in 1867 consisted of present and former militiamen who undertook to serve overseas in case of war.

== Cardwell Reforms ==
Under the 'Localisation of the Forces' scheme introduced by the Cardwell Reforms of 1872, militia regiments were brigaded with their local regular and Volunteer battalions. Sub-District No 36 (Somersetshire) was formed at Taunton:

- 1st & 2nd Battalions, 13th (1st Somerset) (Prince Albert's Light Infantry) Regiment of Foot
- 1st Somerset Militia
- 2nd Somerset Militia
- 1st–3rd Administrative Battalions, Somerset Rifle Volunteers

The militia now came under the War Office rather than their county lords lieutenant. Around a third of the recruits and many young officers went on to join the regular army. The sub-districts were to establish a brigade depot for their linked battalions, but it was not until 1879–81 that Jellalabad Barracks was built as the depot at Taunton. The 1st and 2nd Somerset Militia had adopted Leigh Camp near Taunton as their training ground in 1873.

Following the Cardwell Reforms a mobilisation scheme began to appear in the Army List from December 1875. This assigned regular and militia units to places in an order of battle of corps, divisions and brigades for the 'Active Army', even though these formations were entirely theoretical, with no staff or services assigned. The 1st or 'West Somerset' and the 2nd Somerset Militia were both assigned to 1st Brigade of 3rd Division, IV Corps in Ireland. Both regiments were redesignated as light infantry, on 1 November 1875 (1st) and 12 February 1876 (2nd).

== Somerset Light Infantry ==
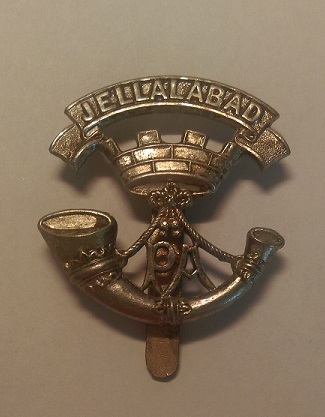
The Somerset Light Infantry's cap badge

The Childers Reforms took Cardwell's reforms further, with the linked battalions forming single regiments. From 1 July 1881 the 13th Foot became Prince Albert's (Somersetshire Light Infantry), or more familiarly the Somerset Light Infantry (SLI) with the 1st and 2nd Somerset Light Infantry Militia as its 3rd and 4th Battalions.

=== Second Boer War ===
At the start of the Second Boer War 1899, most of the regular battalions were sent to South Africa, the Militia Reserve was mobilised to reinforce them and many militia units were called out to replace them for home defence. The 4th SLI were embodied on 4 December 1899 and volunteered for overseas service. The battalion arrived in South Africa in April 1900, where its duties included garrisoning the lines of communication and later the blockhouse lines. The 3rd SLI were embodied on 15 May 1900 and served in the Plymouth defences. Although it did not go overseas, a number of officers volunteered to serve in South Africa, some with the 4th Bn. The 3rd Bn was disembodied on 4 December, but the 4th Bn remained in South Africa until April 1902, when peace negotiations were under way. It disembodied on 14 May, having suffered a number of men killed or died of disease. The 4th Bn was awarded the Battle honour South Africa 1900–02 and the men received the campaign medals.

== Special Reserve ==
After the Boer War, there were moves to reform the Auxiliary Forces (militia, yeomanry and volunteers) to take their place in the six army corps proposed by St John Brodrick as Secretary of State for War. However, little of Brodrick's scheme was carried out. Under the sweeping Haldane Reforms of 1908, the militia was replaced by the Special Reserve (SR), a semi-professional force similar to the previous militia reserve, whose role was to provide reinforcement drafts for regular units serving overseas in wartime. While the 3rd (1st Somerset Militia) Bn became the 3rd (Reserve) Bn, SLI, the 4th (2nd Somerset Militia) Bn was disbanded, though many members transferred to the 3rd Bn. (Note: The 1st Volunteer Bn became the new 4th Bn (Territorial Force).)

=== World War I and after ===
The 3rd Battalion was embodied on the outbreak of World War I and went to the Plymouth Garrison where it trained and prepared reinforcement drafts for the SLI battalions serving overseas. In 1917 it moved to Northern Ireland for the rest of the war. It was disembodied in September 1919.

The 3rd Battalion also formed the 9th (Reserve) Battalion at Plymouth to train reinforcements for the 'Kitchener's Army' battalions of the SLI.

The SR resumed its old title of Militia in 1921 but like most militia units the 3rd SLI remained in abeyance after World War I. By the outbreak of World War II in 1939, no officers remained listed for the 3rd Bn. The Militia was formally disbanded in April 1953.

== Heritage and ceremonial ==
=== Uniforms and insignia ===
The mounted 'petronels' of the Elizabethan Somerset Trained Bands wore coats of a uniform colour, and the footmen of the period usually wore blue cassocks and red caps. The Restoration Militia mainly wore red coats like the Regular Army: Portman's Regiment during the Sedgemoor campaign wore yellow facings, hence it was known as the Yellow Regiment. The Bath Regiment probably wore blue facings in 1697. When the militia was revived in 1759 the Somerset Militia wore red uniforms with black facings – black being the livery colour of Earl Poulett, the Lord Lieutenant of Somerset and colonel of the 1st Somersets. The Regimental Colour would also have been black, displaying the Poulett coat of arms. After the Earl of Cork became colonel in 1784, he changed the facing colour to lemon yellow. By about 1811 the 1st Somersets reverted to black velvet facings, but the 2nd retained yellow until the 1850s. When the Somerset Militia became part of the SLI they lost their familiar black facings and adopted the blue that had been awarded to the 13th Foot when they became 'Prince Albert's' and hence a Royal regiment in 1842.

The heraldic crest of the Duke of Monmouth (a chained dragon on a Cap of maintenance) was awarded to the Yellow Regiment of the Somerset Militia as a badge after his capture following the Battle of Sedgemoor. This was retained by the 1st Somerset Militia, which also adopted the motto of Taunton: Defendemus ('We will defend'). From 1881 the 3rd and 4th Bns of the SLI wore that regiment's cap badge of a light infantry bugle-horn beneath a Mural crown surmounted by a scroll bearing the battle honour 'JELLALABAD'.

Little is known about the Local Militia, but the East and West Mendip regiments wore distinctive crossbelt plates.

=== Precedence ===
In 1759 it was ordered that militia regiments on service were to take precedence from the date of their arrival in camp. In 1760 this was altered to a system of drawing lots where regiments did duty together. During the War of American Independence the counties were given an order of precedence determined by ballot each year. For the Somerset Militia the positions were:

- 3rd on 1 June 1778
- 20th on12 May 1779
- 29th on 6 May 1780
- 21st on 28 April 1781
- 21st on 7 May 1782

The militia order of precedence balloted for in 1793 (Somerset was 40th) remained in force throughout the French Revolutionary War: this covered all the regiments in the county. Another ballot for precedence took place in 1803 at the start of the Napoleonic War and remained in force until 1833: Somerset was 9th. In 1833 the King drew the lots for individual regiments and the resulting list continued in force with minor amendments until the end of the militia. The regiments raised before the peace of 1763 took the first 47 places: the 1st Somerset became 16th and the 2nd Somerset 47th. Most regiments took little notice of the numeral.

== See also ==
- Militia (English)
- Militia (Great Britain)
- Militia (United Kingdom)
- Special Reserve
- Somerset Trained Bands
- 1st Somerset Militia
- 2nd Somerset Militia
- Somerset Light Infantry
