= Nathaniel Wade =

English lawyer (1666–1718)

Nathaniel Wade (c. 1666? – 1718) was an English lawyer and conspirator implicated in the Rye House Plot and participant in the Monmouth Rebellion.

== Biography ==
=== Early life ===
Nathaniel Wade, born around 1666, was the third son of John Wade of the Wick-house, Arlingham, Gloucestershire. John Wade was a major in Oliver Cromwell's army and governor of the Isle of Man for a short period under the Protector. The maiden name of his mother, who was buried in St. Stephen's, Bristol, on 22 March 1678–79, was Lane. The John Wade who is claimed as the founder of the family was mayor of Bristol in 1576, and is described in the corporation records as a Lollard. The family resided at Filton, near Bristol since 1560.

=== Conspiracy ===
Nathaniel entered the New Inn on 11 June 1678, and the Middle Temple on 16 June 1681. As a young lawyer of the country party and a frequenter, it would appear, of the Green Ribbon Club, he had some dealings with Richard Rumbold and other insurgent "republicans" in the spring of 1683.

He was suspected of complicity in the Rye House Plot, and on 23 June a reward of £100 was offered for his apprehension, together with Rumbold, John Rumsey, Richard Goodenough, and other plotters. Three witnesses were found to give evidence against him, but he escaped to Holland, where he spent two years in an atmosphere of whig intrigue, and, according to his own account, acted as an emissary between the Duke of Monmouth and Archibald Campbell, 9th Earl of Argyll.

Wade took part in the Monmouth Rebellion, sailing with Monmouth at the end of May 1685, and landing at Lyme Regis on 11 June. Three days later he marched with Forde Grey, earl of Tankerville, in the direction of Bridport, at the head of about three hundred infantry, and took part in an indecisive and shambling encounter with the Dorset militia.

At Taunton he at first opposed Monmouth proclaiming himself king, but he subsequently overcame his republican scruples, fighting in the van at the Battle of Sedgemoor as colonel of "Monmouth's" regiment. After Sedgemoor he fled to the coast, but found a frigate cruising off the spot where he had hoped to embark. He was soon captured, taken to London, and committed to Newgate Prison on 5 October. In spite of his previous record, he was allowed to turn king's evidence (19 October), and he received a free pardon on 4 June 1686. In the meantime he had given evidence against Henry Booth, Lord Delamere, and doubtless aided the crown prosecutions in some other cases.

=== Later life ===
In January 1687 King James, anxious to win the good opinion of the dissenters, sent Wade to Bristol with the order of the council for the "remodelling" of the corporation, and he presented his special commission under the privy seal to the mayor on 4 February. In a second document, setting forth the new appointments, Wade himself by way of reward was nominated town clerk of the city. His tenure of the office did not survive the events of the following October, when John Romsey was reinstated (17 October); but he seems to have retained some position in Bristol, as in Queen Anne's charter to the city of 24 July 1710 he was confirmed in his office of steward of the sheriff's court. In 1714 he headed the militia at Bristol against the Kingswood colliers. He resigned his municipal post, after upwards of six years' service, early in 1712. During 1711 he took part in building a bridge over the River Frome at Wade Street, Bristol, long known as the "Traitor's Bridge". Wade died at Nailsea Court early in 1718, and was buried on 14 March 1717–18 "at the foot of Mrs. Noble's tombstone" in Redcross Street burial-ground. He was granted a commission as major by Monmouth "on ship-board", and he was spoken of in his later years as "Major Wade".
