= John Strangways (died 1666) =

English politician (1585–1666)

Arms of Strangways: Sable, two lions passant paly of six argent and gules

Sir John Strangways (27 September 1585 – 30 December 1666) of Melbury House, Melbury Sampford, Somerset, and of Abbotsbury in Dorset, was an English politician who sat in the House of Commons variously between 1614 and 1666. He supported the Royalist side in the English Civil War.

== Origins ==
He was born on 27 September 1585, the 3rd but 2nd surviving son of John Strangways (c.1548-1593) of Melbury Sampford, Sheriff of Dorset,(the son of Giles Strangways ) by his wife Dorothy Thynne, a daughter of Sir John Thynne (c.1515-1580) of Longleat in Wiltshire, steward to Edward Seymour, 1st Duke of Somerset, a Member of Parliament, the builder of Longleat House and ancestor of the Marquesses of Bath.

== Career ==
He was appointed Sheriff of Dorset for 1612 and in 1614 elected Member of Parliament for Dorset. He was re-elected MP for Dorset in 1621 and 1624. In 1625 he was elected MP for Weymouth and Melcombe Regis and was re-elected MP for Weymouth in 1626. He was elected MP for Dorset again in 1628 and sat until 1629 when King Charles decided to rule without parliament for eleven years.

In April 1640, Strangways was re-elected MP for Weymouth in the Short Parliament and was re-elected for the Long Parliament in November 1640. He supported the King's cause with great vigour and was disabled from sitting in parliament in September 1642. In 1645 he was captured at Sherborne Castle and was committed to the Tower of London. He was allowed to compound for his liberty, and offered £7000 which was refused. In 1648 he was released from imprisonment and his son Giles remained as a hostage until his fine was paid.

In 1661 Strangways was elected an MP for Weymouth for the Cavalier Parliament remaining until his death in 1666.

== Marriages and children ==
He married twice:

- Firstly at some time before 1607 to Grace Trenchard (d.1652), a daughter of Sir George Trenchard of Wolveton, Charminster, Dorset, by whom he had issue three sons (of whom two predeceased him) and three daughters, including:
  - Giles Strangways (1615-1675) of Melbury, eldest son and heir, MP. A Royalist during the Civil War.
  - Elizabeth Strangways
  - Howarda Strangways (daughter), probably named after Thomas Howard, 1st Earl of Suffolk, Lord Chamberlain, Lord-Lieutenant of Dorset. She married firstly Edward Rogers, a brother of Richard Rogers. She married secondly in 1624 Sir Lewis Dyve, MP for Bridport, Dorset, a step-son of John Digby, 1st Earl of Bristol.
- Secondly on 8 June 1653, he married Judith Throckmorton, a daughter of Francis Throckmorton of Wootton Wawen, Warwickshire, widow of Thomas Edwards, of the City of London and of Wadhurst, Sussex, a member of the Worshipful Company of Mercers. Without issue.

== Death ==
Strangways died at the age of 81.

== Sources ==
- Ferris, John. P., biography of "Strangways, Sir John (1585-1666), of Melbury Sampford, Dorset", published in History of Parliament: House of Commons 1660-1690, ed. B.D. Henning, 1983"
- John. P. Ferris & Paul Hunneyball, biography of "Strangways (Strangwish), Sir John (1585-1666), of Melbury Sampford and Abbotsbury, Dorset", published in History of Parliament: House of Commons 1604-1629, ed. Andrew Thrush and John P. Ferris, 2010

Parliament of England
Preceded by Sir Thomas Freke; John Williams	Member of Parliament for Dorset; 1614; With: Sir Mervyn Audley 1614; Thomas Trenchard 1621–1622; Sir George Hussey 1624	Succeeded by Sir Walter Erle; Sir Nathaniel Napier
Preceded by Arthur Pyne; Thomas Myddelton; John Freke; Henry Waltham	Member of Parliament for Weymouth and Melcombe Regis; 1625–1626; With: Arthur Pyne; Thomas Myddelton; Bernard Michell	Succeeded by Hugh Pyne; Sir Robert Napier; Lewis Dyve; Henry Waltham
Preceded by Sir Thomas Freke; Sir George Morton, 1st Baronet	Member of Parliament for Dorset; 1628–1629; With: Sir George Hussey	Parliament suspended until 1640
Vacant Parliament suspended since 1629	Member of Parliament for Weymouth and Melcombe Regis; 1640–1642; With: Giles Strangways 1640; Thomas Gyard 1640; Richard King 1640–1642; Sir Gerrard Napier, 1st Baronet 1640–1642; Sir Walter Erle 1640–1642	Succeeded by William Sydenham; John Bond; Matthew Allen; Sir Walter Erle
Preceded by Bullen Reymes; Sir William Penn; Peter Middleton; Henry Waltham	Member of Parliament for Weymouth and Melcombe Regis; 1661–1666; With: Bullen Reymes; Sir William Penn; Winston Churchill	Succeeded by Bullen Reymes; Sir William Penn; Winston Churchill; Sir John Coventry
