= Giles Strangways =

English politician

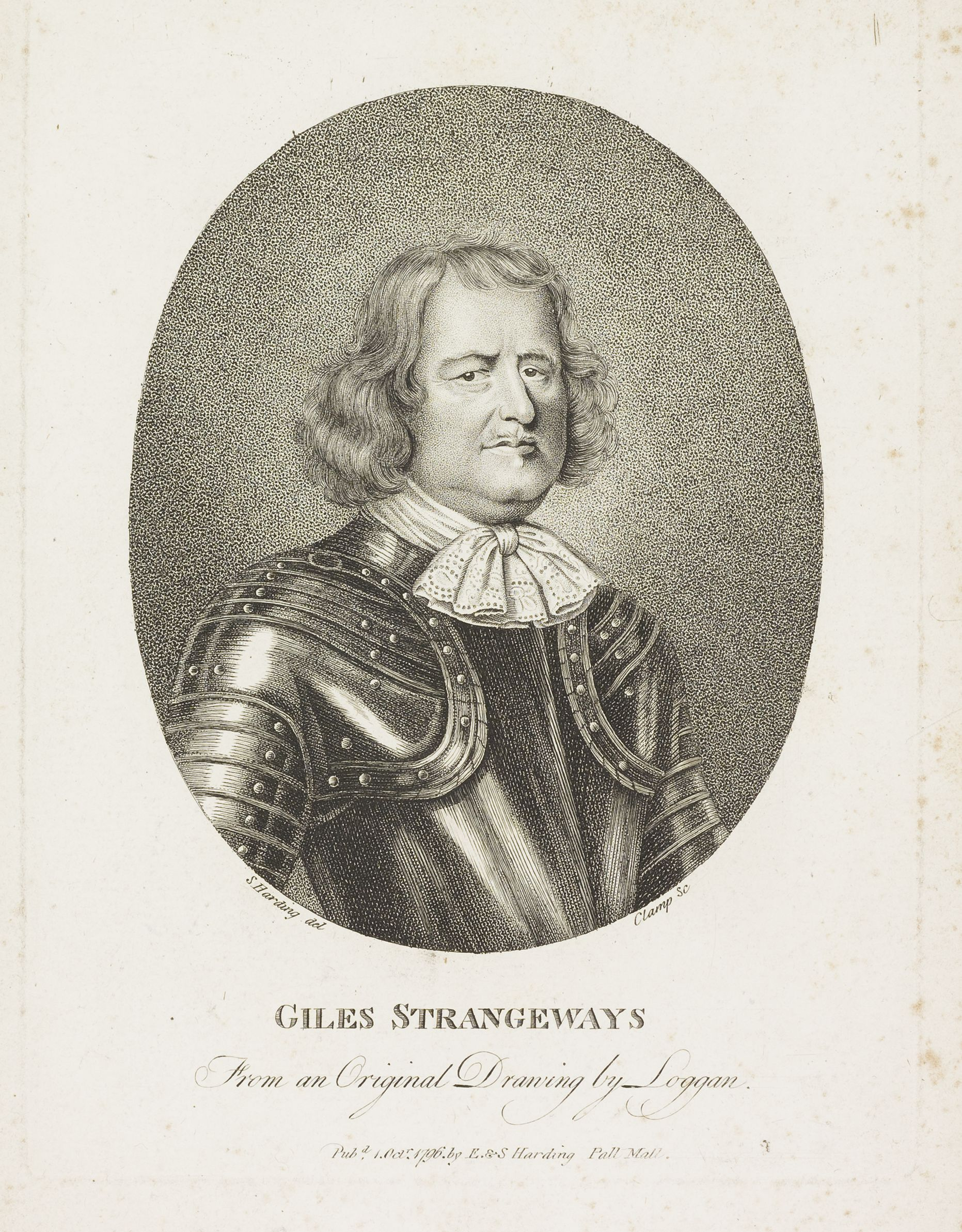
Giles Strangways

Arms of Strangways: Sable, two lions passant paly of six argent and gules

Giles Strangways (3 June 1615 – 20 July 1675) of Melbury House in Somerset, was an English politician who sat in the House of Commons variously between 1640 and 1675. He fought on the Royalist side during the Civil War

== Origins ==
He was the son of Sir John Strangways (1585-1666) of Melbury and his first wife Grace Trenchard, daughter of Sir George Trenchard of Wolveton.

== Career ==
In April 1640 he was elected a Member of Parliament for Weymouth and Melcombe Regis, Dorset, in the Short Parliament. He was elected MP for Bridport, Dorset, in the Long Parliament in November 1640. He supported the king and was a Colonel in a regiment of horse. He was disabled from sitting in Parliament in January 1644 and was fined £10,000 for the service of the navy in August 1644. He was imprisoned in the Tower of London for two and a half years, partly as a hostage for his father. When he was set free, he had a very large gold medal struck, to commemorate his imprisonment.

In 1651, as King Charles II was trying to escape from England after losing the Battle of Worcester, he stayed at Trent Manor, the home of Francis Wyndham, who consulted his cousin Strangways (both were descended from John Wadham (d.1578)) about finding a ship to carry the king to France. Strangways was unable to help find a ship, but was able to provide 300 gold pieces to Charles, and encouraged Wyndham to search further in the area around Lyme (now Lyme Regis.)

In 1661 Strangways was elected an MP for Dorset for the Cavalier Parliament remaining until his death in 1675.

== Marriage and children ==
Strangways married Susanna Edwards, a daughter of Thomas Edwards, of the City of London, a member of the Worshipful Company of Mercers, by whom he had issue including:

- Thomas Strangways (1643–1713), MP;
- John Strangways (died 1676), MP;
- Wadham Strangways, MP.
- Grace Strangways. m. Francis Dyves.
- Judith Strangways. m. (1665) George Ayliffe of Grittenham, Wilts.
- Susanna Strangways (1651-1686). m. (1672/3) James Long of Athelhampton, Dorset. He was the eldest son and heir of Sir James Long, 2nd Baronet

Parliament of England
Vacant Parliament suspended since 1629	Member of Parliament for Weymouth and Melcombe Regis; 1640; With: Sir John Strangways; Richard King; Thomas Gyard	Succeeded by Sir John Strangways; Sir Gerrard Napier, 1st Baronet; Sir Walter Erle
Preceded by Thomas Trenchard; Sir John Meller	Member of Parliament for Bridport; 1640–1644; With: Roger Hill	Succeeded by Roger Hill; Roger Ceeley
Preceded by John Fitzjames; Robert Coker	Member of Parliament for Dorset; 1661–1675; With: John Strode	Succeeded by John Strode; Lord Digby
