= Edmund Prideaux =

Edmund Prideaux may refer to:

- Sir Edmund Prideaux, 1st Baronet of Netherton (1554–1628), English lawyer
- Edmund Prideaux (Roundhead) (died 1659), English lawyer and member of Parliament
- Edmund Prideaux (MP for Taunton) (1632–1702), member of Parliament for Taunton
- Edmund Prideaux (artist) (1693–1745), English architectural artist
- Sir Edmund Prideaux, 4th Baronet (1647–1720), British lawyer and politician
