= Walter Erle =

English landowner and politician

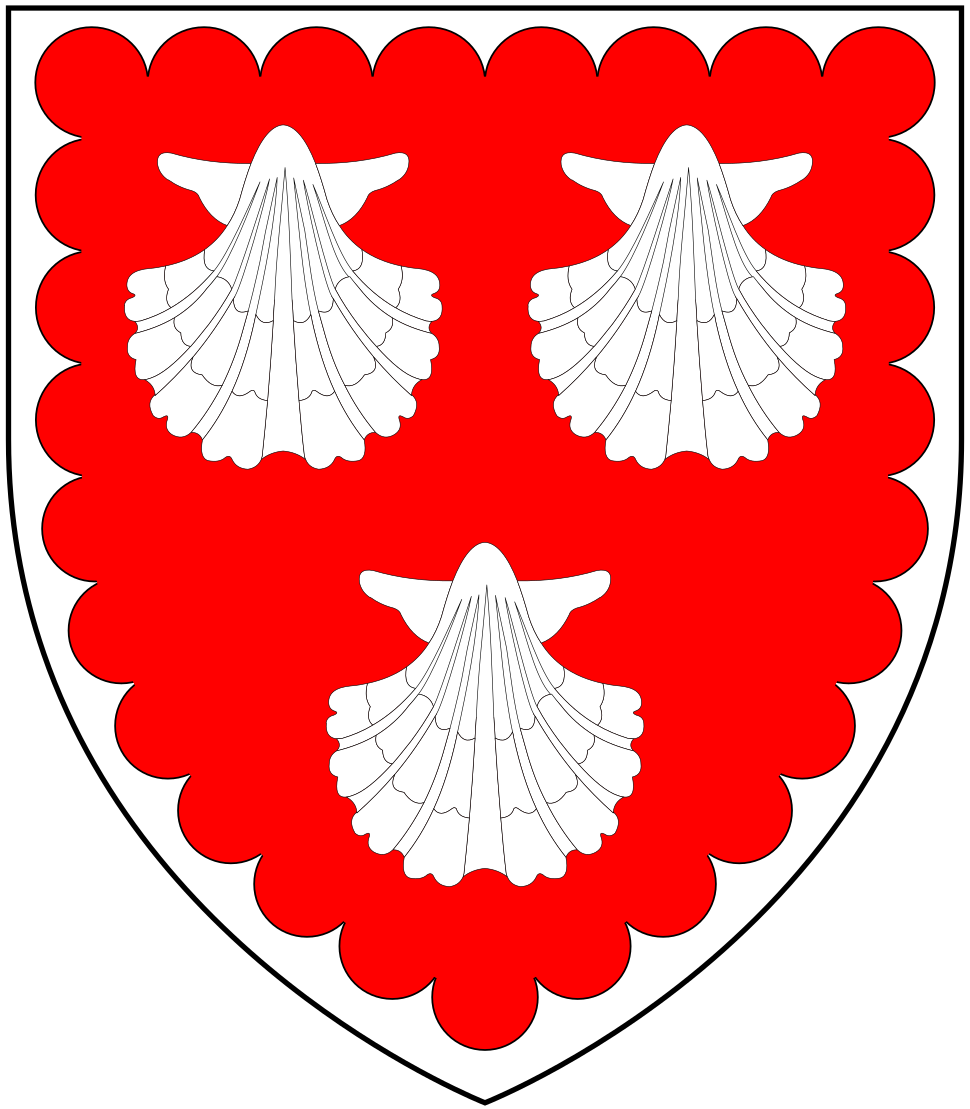
Arms of Erle: Gules, three escallops argent a bordure engrailed of the last

Sir Walter Erle (or Earle; 22 November 1586 – 1 September 1665) was an English landowner and politician who sat in the House of Commons at various times between 1614 and 1648. He was a vigorous opponent of King Charles I in the Parliamentary cause both before and during the English Civil War.

== Early life ==
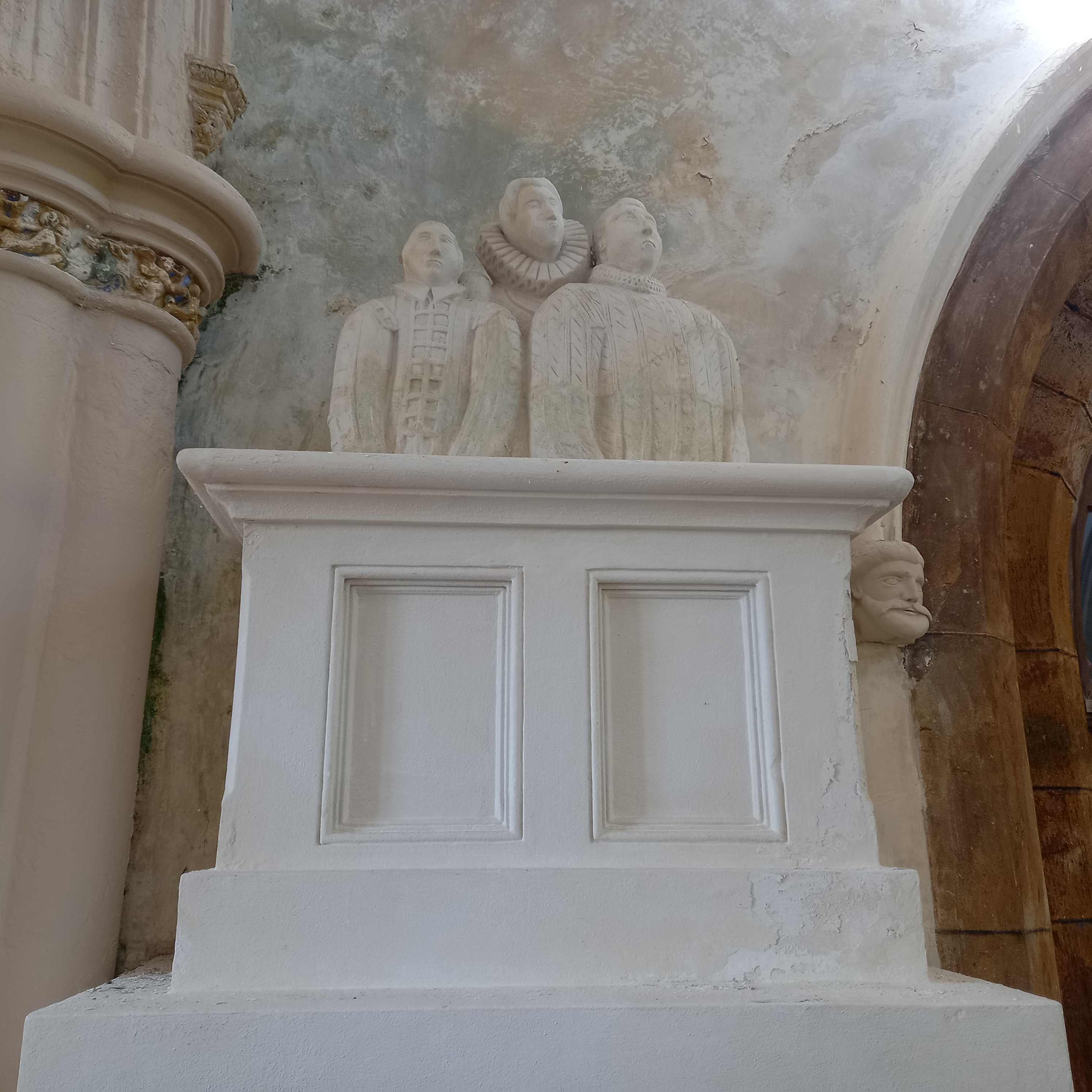
The three surviving children of Thomas Erle, Walter (right), Christopher and Elizabeth, depicted at St Mary's Church, Morden, Dorset.

Walter Erle was the son of Thomas Erle of Charborough Park in Dorset and his wife Dorothy Pole, daughter of William Pole of Columpton, Devon. On the death of his father in 1597, aged only ten, Walter inherited the Charborough estate and other holdings totalling some 11,000 acres (4,450 hectares); he was made a ward of the Crown, but was later under the guardianship of his stepfather, Sir Walter Vaughan He matriculated at Queen's College, Oxford on 22 January 1602 aged 15. In 1604 he became a student of Inner Temple.

In 1614, Erle was elected Member of Parliament for Poole. He was knighted on 4 May 1616, and in 1618 served as High Sheriff of Dorset. Like many of the other leading citizens of Dorset, he was an early investor in projects to colonise New England. He and his brother Christopher were both shareholders in the Virginia Company in 1620, and he attended the meeting of that company on 21 May 1621. He was a friend of John White and became a founder member of the Dorchester Company, being described as "Governor of the New England Plantation".

== Parliament and imprisonment ==
In 1621 Erle was re-elected MP for Poole and was elected again in 1624 and 1625. He was also one of the Justices of Peace for Dorset. In 1625, he was elected MP for Lyme Regis. Parliament was dissolved without voting subsidies to the Crown, and the King attempted to shore up the governmental finances by imposing forced loans on the gentry. Erle was one of the four men in Dorset who refused to pay and as a result he was summoned before the Council, and imprisoned for almost a year in the Fleet Prison before he was able to obtain a writ of habeas corpus. On hearing the case, the judges upheld the prisoners' right to be released, setting a major legal precedent in the restriction of the Crown's autocratic powers. His brother Christopher took his seat at Lyme Regis in 1628.

== Short and Long parliaments ==
After King Charles ruled without parliament for eleven years, Erle was elected MP for Lyme Regis in the Short Parliament in April 1640. On the day after the dissolution of Parliament, he was one of the six men arrested on the King's orders under suspicion of treasonable correspondence with the Scots, with whom England was by this time at war. In November 1640, Erle was returned as MP for Weymouth and Melcombe Regis for the Long Parliament, and was appointed one of the managers of the prosecution in the impeachment of Strafford, but entrusted with proving the charge that Strafford had plotted to bring over the Irish army to suppress unrest in England he bungled his case so that the hearing was at first adjourned on the grounds that the "evidence was not ready" and then the article was in effect dropped altogether. This failure may have contributed significantly to the decision to abandon legal process and proceed against Strafford by Act of Attainder.

== Civil War ==
On the outbreak of the Civil War, Erle became a Colonel in the Parliamentary army. He succeeded John Pym as Lieutenant of the Ordnance in 1643, and was also appointed military governor of Dorchester. However, when he led his forces to besiege Corfe Castle in 1643 he was repulsed after six weeks having lost a hundred men, and he fled Dorchester by sea at the approach of a superior Royal army under Lord Carnarvon. In 1645 he received the thanks of the Commons for deciphering some intercepted letters, and the following year was one of the four commissioners sent to negotiate peace with the King. He continued to sit in Parliament until 1648, when he was excluded in Pride's Purge.

== Later parliamentary career ==
Erle was returned as MP for Dorset in 1654 for the First Protectorate Parliament and in 1659 for the Second Protectorate Parliament. In April 1660, he was elected again as MP for Poole in the Convention Parliament.

Erle died at the age of 78.

== Family ==
Erle married Ann Dymoke daughter of Francis Dymoke, and sister of Sir Henry Dymoke, and through her acquired the manors of Erckington and Pipe, Warwickshire, which he sold to Sir Walter Devereux, Bt. Their son Thomas was also an MP in the Long Parliament with his father, and the latter's son, also called Thomas was a distinguished general.

Parliament of England
Preceded by Thomas Robarts; Edward Mann	Member of Parliament for Poole; 1614–1624; With: Sir Thomas Walsingham, junior 1614; Sir George Hussey 1621–1622; Edward Pitt 1624	Succeeded by John Pyne; Sir John Cooper, 1st Baronet
Preceded by Sir George Hussey; John Strangways	Member of Parliament for Dorset; 1625; With: Sir Nathaniel Napier	Succeeded by Sir George Morton, 1st Baronet; Sir Thomas Freke
Preceded by John Drake; Thomas Paramour	Member of Parliament for Lyme Regis; 1626; With: Thomas Paramour	Succeeded by Thomas Paramour; Christopher Erle
Parliament suspended since 1629	Member of Parliament for Lyme Regis; 1640; With: Richard Rose	Succeeded by Richard Rose; Edmund Prideaux
Preceded by John Strangways; Giles Strangways; Richard King; Thomas Gyard	Member of Parliament for Weymouth and Melcombe Regis; 1640–1648; With: John Strangways 1640–1642; Richard King 1640–1643; Sir Gerrard Napier, 1st Baronet 1640–1644; William Sydenham 1645–1653; John Bond 1645–1648; Matthew Allen 1645–1648	Succeeded by William Sydenham
Preceded by William Sydenham	Member of Parliament for Dorset; 1654; With: John Bingham; John Bingham; John Fitzjames; John Trenchard; Henry Henley	Succeeded by William Sydenham; John Bingham; Robert Coker; John Fitzjames; John Trenchard
Preceded by William Sydenham; John Bingham; Robert Coker; John Fitzjames; John Trenchard; James Dewey	Member of Parliament for Dorset; 1659; With: John Bingham	Not represented in Restored Rump
