= Thomas Freke (died 1633) =

English merchant and politician

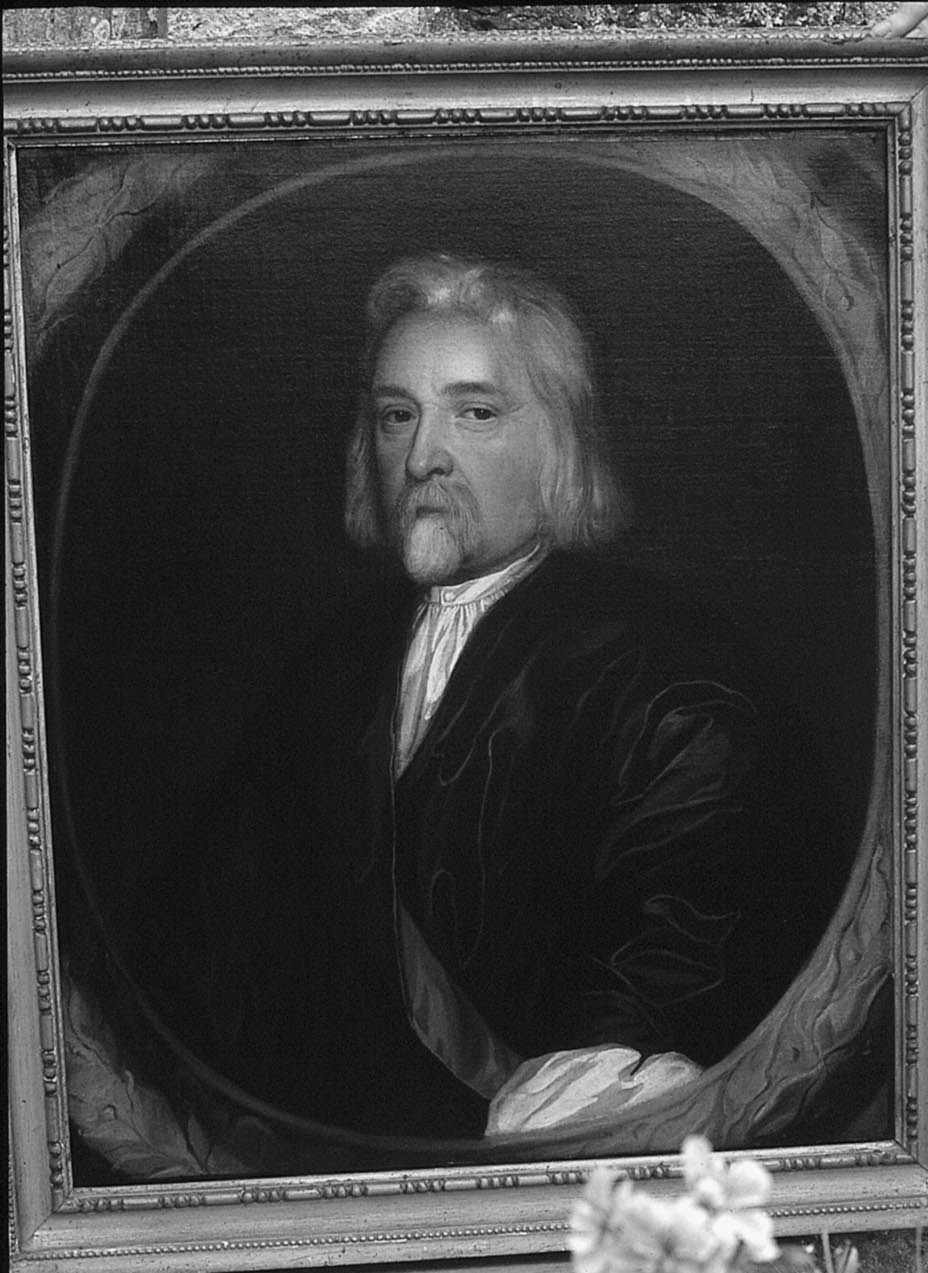

Member of the English Parliament for Dorchester
- In office 1584

High Sheriff of Dorset
- In office 1597–1598, 1611–1612

Member of the English Parliament for Dorset
- In office 1604–1611

Member of the King's Council for Virginia
- In office 1607 – at least 1612

Member of the English Parliament for Dorset
- In office 1626

Personal details
- Born: 27 September 1563
- Died: 5 May 1633 (aged 69)
- Spouse: Elizabeth Taylor
- Children: 12, including John Freke
- Parents: Robert Freke (father); Alice Swayne (mother)
- Occupation: merchant and politician

Sir Thomas Freke (27 September 1563 – 5 May 1633) was an English merchant adventurer and politician who sat in the House of Commons at various times between 1584 and 1626.

Freke was the eldest son of Robert Freke of Iwerne Courtney, and his wife Alice Swayne, daughter of Robert Swayne of Blandford. His father was teller of the Exchequer and surveyor for Dorset. In 1584, Freke was elected Member of Parliament for Dorchester. He succeeded his father in 1592 and became a J.P. for Dorset. He was High Sheriff of Dorset from 1597 to 1598.

Freke was knighted in 1603. He was Deputy Lieutenant of Dorset for about 30 years, and was a respected figure in the county. He and his son were owners of the ship 'Leopold' of Weymouth, which was one of the largest Dorset privateers. In 1604 he was elected MP for Dorset. He became a member of the King's council for Virginia in 1607. He was High Sheriff of Dorset again from 1611 to 1612. In 1612 he was on the council for the Virginia Company. He was elected MP for Dorset again in 1626.

Freke married Elizabeth Taylor daughter of John Taylor of Burton Bradstock and had seven sons and five daughters. She died in 1640. His son John Freke was also an MP. His daughter Alice married Sir George Hastings.

Parliament of England
Preceded by George Carleton; George Trenchard	Member of Parliament for Dorchester; 1584; With: Robert Beale	Succeeded by Robert Beale; Robert Napier
Preceded by George Trenchard; Sir Edmund Uvedall	Member of Parliament for Dorset; 1604; With: John Williams	Succeeded by Sir Mervyn Audley; Sir John Strangways
Preceded by Sir Walter Erle; Sir Nathaniel Napier	Member of Parliament for Dorset; 1626; With: Sir George Morton	Succeeded by Sir George Hussey; Sir John Strangways
