= Sir Gerrard Napier, 1st Baronet =

English Member of Parliament

Sir Gerrard Napier, 1st Baronet or Napper (19 October 1606 – 14 May 1673), of Middle Marsh and Moor Crichel in Dorset, was an English Member of Parliament (MP) who supported the Royalists during the English Civil War.

Napier was born in 1606 and baptised on 19 October at Steeple, Dorset. He was the eldest son of Sir Nathaniel Napier, also an MP, and the grandson of Sir Robert Napier, a judge who had been Chief Baron of the Irish Exchequer. His mother was Elizabeth Gerrard, daughter of John Gerrard, who brought the Steeple estate into the Napier family. The marriage of his parents gave rise to a good deal of unfavourable comment as they were aged eleven and nine, which was considered to be exceptionally young even in an age of early marriage. He was a commoner of Trinity College, Oxford in 1623–4. He entered Parliament in 1628 as member for Wareham, and was elected for Weymouth and Melcombe Regis in the Long Parliament.

Napier seemed frequently somewhat equivocal in his loyalties. In 1640, as Deputy Lieutenant of Dorset, he was accused of being insufficiently enthusiastic in pressing men for the King's service, and was summoned for questioning by the House of Lords and Attorney General, but apparently was able to explain himself sufficiently that in the following year, on 25 June 1641, he was created a baronet. On the outbreak of the Civil War, he remained loyal to the Crown, and stopped attending the Commons, yet made a £500 loan to Parliament when ordered to do so.

He joined the Royalist army, being one of the commissioners who demanded the surrender of Dorchester, and in January 1644 was disabled from sitting in the Commons for adhering to the King, and subsequently sat in the King's Oxford Parliament. But in September 1644 he submitted to Parliament, and advanced £500 for the relief of Parliamentary garrisons. He was fined a comparatively small amount,£3,514, although his estates in Dorset and Kent were sequestered and in total is said to have lost more than £10,000. Nevertheless, he managed to gather together a further £500 to contribute to the court in exile of the young Charles II, but the man entrusted with secretly transmitting the money to the King, Sir Gilbert Taylor, kept it for himself. However, the facts were uncovered after the Restoration, and Taylor was arrested. Napier was appointed High Sheriff of Dorset for 1650–51.

In token of his loyalty, the King ordered that Sir Gerrard should be annually sent a number of deer from the New Forest, and in 1662 he was also appointed Commissioner for Crown Lands in Dorset. In 1665, when the court had moved temporarily to Salisbury because of the plague in London, Sir Gerrard had the honour of entertaining the King and Queen at his house at Moor Crichel.

Napier married Margaret Colles, daughter of John Colles of Barton Grange, Pitminster, Somersett, and they had one son and two daughters who survived to adulthood. Margaret died in 1660 and he died on 14 May 1673 and was buried at Minterne Church. He was succeeded by his son, Sir Nathaniel.

Parliament of England
Preceded by Sir Nathaniel Napier; Edward Laurence	Member of Parliament for Wareham; 1628–1629; With: Sir John Meller	Succeeded by John Trenchard; Gilbert Jones
Preceded by Sir John Strangways; Giles Strangways; Thomas Gyard; Richard King	Member of Parliament for Weymouth and Melcombe Regis; 1640–1644; With: Sir John Strangways 1640–1642; Sir Walter Erle 1640–1644; Richard King 1640–1643	Succeeded by Sir Walter Erle; Matthew Allen; John Bond; William Sydenham
Baronetage of England
New creation	Baronet (of Middle Marsh); 1641–1673	Succeeded by Nathaniel Napier
