= Sir George Morton, 1st Baronet =

English landowner and politician

Sir George Morton, 1st Baronet (died 1662), was an English landowner and politician who sat in the House of Commons in 1626.

Morton was the son of Sir George Morton of Milborne St Andrew, Dorset, and his wife Joan Holloway of Walton. He succeeded to the estate of Milborne on the death of his father in 1611, and was created baronet "of Milbourne St Andrew in the County of Dorset" on 1 March 1619. In 1626, he was elected Member of Parliament for Dorset. He was a faithful Royalist during the English Civil War.

Morton married firstly Catharine Hopton, daughter of Sir Arthur Hopton, of Witham. He married secondly Anne Willoughby, widow of Sir Rotherham Willoughby who had died by July 1634, and daughter of Sir Richard Wortley, of Wortley, Yorkshire. He was succeeded by his son John.

Parliament of England
Preceded by Sir Walter Erle; Sir Nathaniel Napier	Member of Parliament for Dorset; 30 January 1626 – 17 February 1626; 27 February 1626 – 15 June 1626; With: Sir Thomas Freke	Succeeded by Sir Walter Erle; Sir John Strangways
Baronetage of England
New creation	Baronet (of Milbourne St Andrew); 1619–1662	Succeeded by John Morton
