= Henry Henley =

English politician (1612–1696)

Henry Henley (c. 1612–1696) was an English politician who sat in the House of Commons at various times between 1653 and 1681. He supported the Parliamentary cause in the English Civil War.

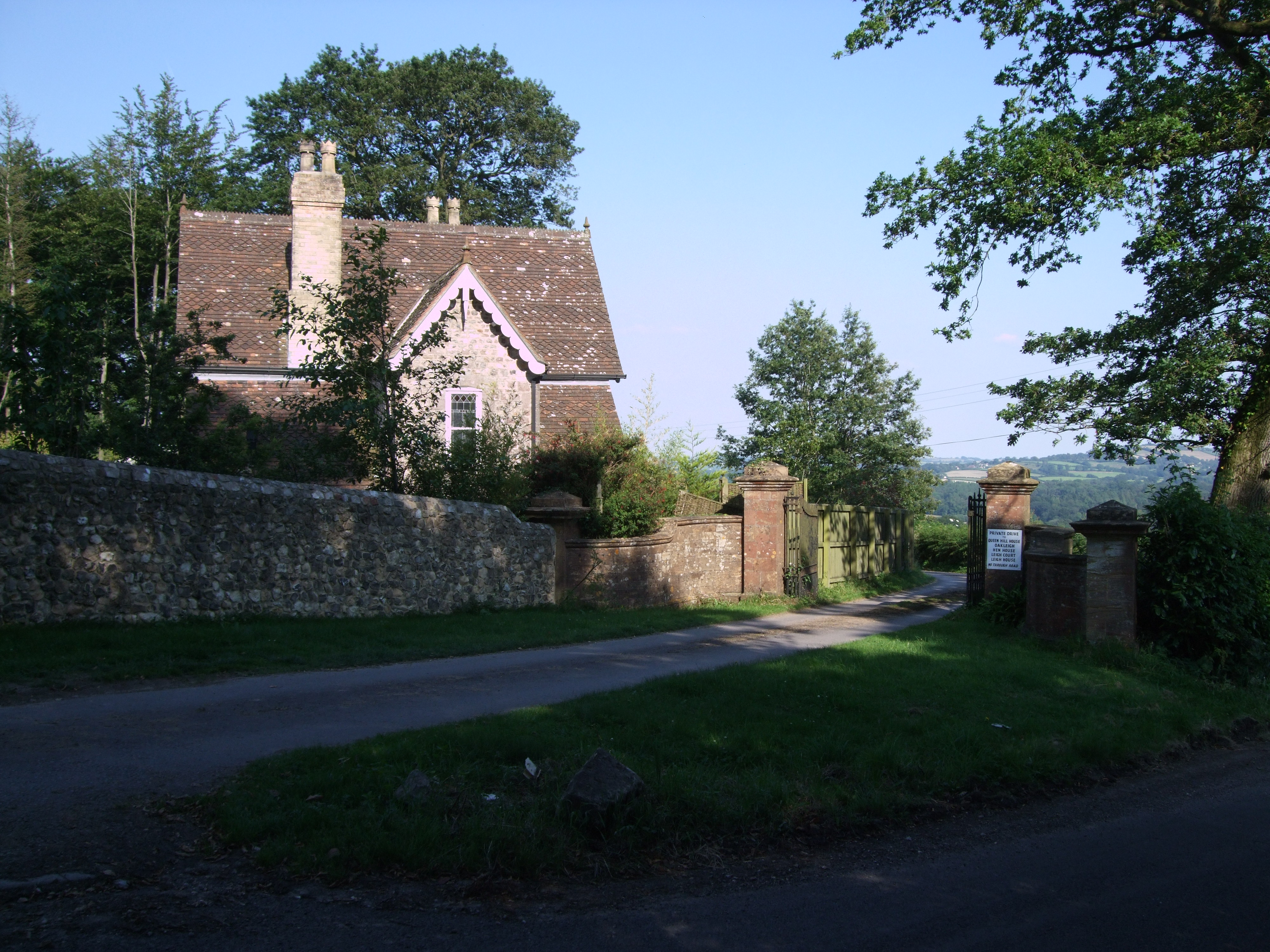
Leigh House, Winsham, Somerset

Henley was the eldest surviving son of Henry Henley of Leigh and his wife Susan Bragge, daughter of William Bragge of Sadborow, Thorncombe, Devon. On his father's death in 1639 he inherited estates at Leigh, Winsham, Somerset and Colway, Lyme Regis, Dorset.

He became a colonel in the Parliamentary army in around 1643 and was a commissioner for sequestrations, assessment and levying of money for Somerset in 1643. In 1644 he was assessment commissioner for Somerset and Dorset and in 1646 became J.P. for Somerset until 1654. He was commissioner for rebuilding at Beaminster in 1647 and was JP for Devon from 1647 to 1657. He became High Sheriff of Dorset in 1648.

In 1653, Henley was nominated Member of Parliament for Somerset in the Barebones Parliament. He was commissioner for execution of ordinances for Somerset and Dorset and commissioner for scandalous ministers for Somerset in 1654 and also was elected MP for Dorset for the First Protectorate Parliament. In 1659 he was elected MP for Lyme Regis in the Third Protectorate Parliament.

Henley was commissioner for assessment for Dorset from January 1660 to 1680 and a JP for Dorset from March to -July 1660. He was commissioner for militia for Dorset in March 1660. In April 1660 he was elected MP for Bridport for the Convention Parliament. In 1661 he was elected MP for Lyme Regis for the Cavalier Parliament where he sat until 1679. He was commissioner for assessment for Somerset from 1664 to 1680. He was commissioner for recusants for Dorset in 1675. In 1679 he became a freeman of Lyme Regis. He was elected MP for Lyme Regis in two parliament in 1679 and again in 1681. In 1688 he became a JP for Somerset in February, a commissioner for inquiry into recusancy fines for Somerset in March and a JP for Dorset in June.

Henley died at the age of 83 and was buried at Winsham on 10 June 1696.

Henley married firstly Susan Moggridge, daughter of Thomas Moggridge, merchant, of Exeter on 28 September 1636. They had two sons. He married secondly to Bridget Bampfield, daughter of John Bampfield of Poltimore, Devon and had two daughters. His son Henry predeceased him in 1683, but Henry jnr's son, another Henry, was also an MP for Lyme Regis. Henry snr's second son, Robert, was likewise an MP for Lyme Regis.

Parliament of England
Preceded by Not represented in Rump Parliament	Member of Parliament for Somerset; 1653; With: General-at-sea Robert Blake; John Pine; Dennis Hollister,	Succeeded by Sir John Horner; John Buckland; General John Desborough; John Preston; John Harrington; John Ashe; Charles Steynings; Robert Long; Richard Jones; Thomas Hippisley; Samuel Perry
Preceded by William Sydenham; John Bingham	Member of Parliament for Dorset; 1654; With: William Sydenham; John Bingham; Sir Walter Earle; John Fitzjames; John Trenchard,	Succeeded by William Sydenham; John Bingham; Robert Coker; John Fitzjames; John Trenchard; James Dewey
Preceded by Sir Edmund Prideaux	Member of Parliament for Lyme Regis; 1659; With: Sir Edmund Prideaux	Succeeded by Sir Edmund Prideaux
