= John Trenchard (of Warmwell) =

English politician

John Trenchard (c. 1586 – 1662) of Warmwell, near Dorchester was an English politician who sat in the House of Commons at various times between 1621 and 1659.

Trenchard was born in Charminster, near Dorchester, the son of Sir George Trenchard of Warmwell and his wife Ann née Speke, daughter of Sir George Speke of White Lackington.

In 1621, Trenchard was elected Member of Parliament for Wareham and was re-elected MP for Wareham in 1624 and 1625.

In April 1640, Trenchard was re-elected MP for Wareham in the Short Parliament and elected again for the same constituency for the Long Parliament in November 1640, sitting until 1653. He was elected MP for Dorset in the First Protectorate Parliament of 1653 and the Second Protectorate Parliament in 1656. He sat again for Weymouth in 1659 in the Restored Rump Parliament.

Trenchard died in London and was buried at Warmwell. He had married Jane Rodney, daughter of Sir John Rodney of Stoke, Somerset. His daughter Jane married John Sadler, Master of Magdalene College, Cambridge, and his daughter Grace married William Sydenham.

Parliament of England
Preceded by John Freke; Sir William Pitt	Member of Parliament for Wareham; 1621–1625; With: Sir William Pitt	Succeeded by Nathaniel Napier; John Meller
Vacant Parliament suspended since 1629	Member of Parliament for Wareham; 1640; With: Gilbert Jones 1640; Thomas Erle 1640–1648	Not represented in Barebones Parliament
Preceded by William Sydenham; John Bingham	Member of Parliament for Dorset; 1654–1656; With: William Sydenham; John Bingham; John Fitzjames; Henry Henley 1654; Sir Walter Earle 1654; Robert Coker 1656; James Dewey 1656	Succeeded by Sir Walter Earle; John Bingham
