= John Meller =

English politician (c.1588–1650)

Sir John Meller (c.1588 – 1649/50) of Bridehead House, Little Bredy, Dorset, was an English politician who sat in the House of Commons in 1628 and 1640. He supported the Royalist cause in the English Civil War.

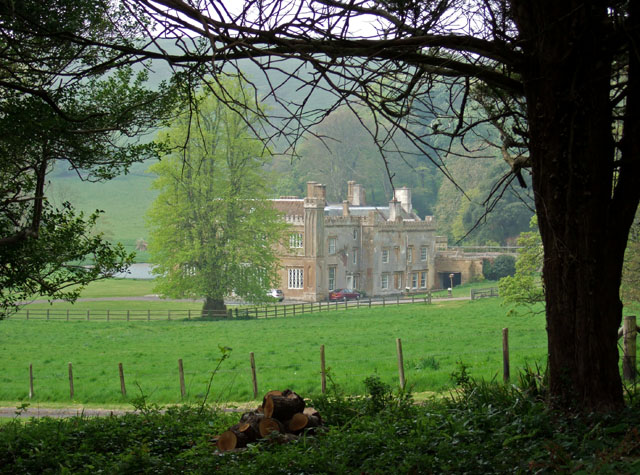
Bridehead House, Little Bredy

Meller was the eldest son of Sir Robert Meller of Little Bredy and his wife Dorothy Bailie, daughter of Harry Bailie of the Isle of Wight. He was educated at Dorchester Grammar School under Mr Harris and was admitted at Caius College, Cambridge, on 15 March 1603 aged 15. He was admitted to the Inner Temple on 15 May 1606. He was knighted on 6 May 1625.

In 1628 Meller was elected Member of Parliament for Wareham and sat until 1629 when King Charles decided to rule without parliament for eleven years. In April 1640, he was elected Member of Parliament for Bridport in the Short Parliament. He supported the King in the Civil War and compounded for £693. He was appointed High Sheriff of Dorset for 1630–31 and High Sheriff of Oxfordshire for 1633–34.

Meller married Mary Swinnerton, daughter of John Swinnerton, Lord Mayor of London in 1612, with whom he had 3 sons and at least 5 daughters.

Parliament of England
Preceded by Sir Nathaniel Napier; Edward Laurence	Member of Parliament for Wareham; 1628–1629; With: Sir Gerrard Napier, 1st Baronet	Parliament suspended until 1640
Vacant Parliament suspended since 1629	Member of Parliament for Bridport; 1640 (April); With: Thomas Trenchard	Succeeded by Roger Hill; Giles Strangways
