= John Trenchard =

John Trenchard is the name of:

- John Trenchard (politician) (1640–1695), English politician
- John Trenchard (writer) (1662–1723), English writer
- John Trenchard (of Warmwell) (c.1596–1662), MP for Wareham and Dorset
