= John Bingham (Roundhead) =

English politician

John Bingham (1613 – 1673) was an English politician who sat in the House of Commons between 1645 and 1659. He served in the Parliamentary army in the English Civil War.

Bingham was the son of Richard Bingham, of Bingham's Melcombe, Dorset, and his wife Jane Hopton, daughter of Sir Arthur Hopton. He matriculated at Brasenose College, Oxford, on 9 December 1631, aged 18. He was a student of the Middle Temple in 1632.

In the Civil War, Bingham was colonel of a regiment of the parliamentary army and Bingham's Melcombe was used as the headquarters of the local parliamentary forces. He was governor of Poole, and took part in the siege of Corfe Castle. He was elected Member of Parliament for Shaftesbury in 1645 in the Long Parliament and survived Pride's Purge to serve in the Rump Parliament. He was nominated MP for Dorset in 1653 for the Barebones Parliament and elected MP for Dorset in 1654, 1656 and 1658 for the First, Second and Third Protectorate Parliaments.

He was Governor of Guernsey from 1651 to 1660.

Bingham married firstly Frances Trenchard, daughter of John Trenchard, and secondly Jane Norwood of Gloucestershire. He had no male heir and was succeeded by his nephew Richard.

Parliament of England
Preceded by William Whitaker; Samuel Turner	Member of Parliament for Shaftesbury; 1645–1652; With: William Whitaker 1645–1646; George Starre 1646; John Fry 1647–1648	Succeeded by Not represented in Barebones Parliament
Preceded by John Browne	Member of Parliament for Dorset; 1653–1659; With: William Sydenham 1653–1656; John Trenchard 1654–1656; John Fitzjames 1654–1656; Henry Henley 1654; Sir Walter Earle 1654; Robert Coker 1656; James Dewey 1656; Sir Walter Earle 1659	Succeeded by Not represented in Restored Rump
