= James Dewey =

English lawyer and politician

James Dewey was an English lawyer and politician who sat in the House of Commons from 1656 to 1659.

Dewey was the son and heir of James Dewey of Christchurch, Hampshire. He matriculated at Exeter College, Oxford on 20 November 1651 and was called to the bar at Middle Temple in 1656. In 1656, he was elected Member of Parliament for Dorset in the Second Protectorate Parliament. He was elected MP for Wareham in 1659 for the Third Protectorate Parliament.

Parliament of England
Preceded by William Sydenham; John Bingham; Sir Walter Earle; John Fitzjames; John Trenchard; Henry Henley	Member of Parliament for Dorset; 1656; With: William Sydenham; John Bingham; Robert Coker, John Fitzjames; John Trenchard	Succeeded by Sir Walter Earle; John Bingham
Preceded by Not represented in Second Protectorate Parliament	Member of Parliament for Wareham; 1659; With: Elias Bond	Succeeded by John Trenchard
