= Thomas Trenchard (Dorset MP) =

English politician

Sir Thomas Trenchard (1582 – 1657) was an English politician who sat in the House of Commons at various times between 1621 and 1648.

Trenchard was the son of Sir George Trenchard of Warmwell and his wife Ann Speke daughter of Sir George Speke of Whitelackington. He was knighted at Theobalds on 15 December 1613. He was appointed High Sheriff of Dorset in 1634.

In 1621, Trenchard was elected Member of Parliament for Dorset. In April 1640, he was elected MP for Bridport in the Short Parliament. In 1645, he was re-elected MP for Dorset for the Long Parliament and sat until 1648 when he was excluded under Pride's Purge.

He commanded a regiment of the Dorset Trained Bands at the Siege of Sherborne at the beginning of the First English Civil War.

Trenchard married Elizabeth Morgan. He had a son Thomas who was the father of John Trenchard Secretary of State.

Parliament of England
Preceded by Sir Mervyn Audley; Sir John Strangways	Member of Parliament for Dorset; 1621; With: Sir John Strangways	Succeeded by Sir John Strangways; Sir George Hussey
Parliament suspended since 1629	Member of Parliament for Bridport; 1640; With: Sir John Meller 1640	Succeeded by Roger Hill; Giles Strangways
Preceded by John Browne; Richard Rogers	Member of Parliament for Dorset; 1645–1648; With: John Browne	Succeeded by John Browne
