= Morton baronets =

Extinct baronetcy in the Baronetage of England

Arms of Morton: Quarterly gules and ermine in the first and fourth quarters a goat's head erased argent armed or

The Morton Baronetcy, of Milbourne St Andrew in the County of Dorset, was a title in the Baronetage of England. It was created on 1 March 1619 for George Morton, subsequently Member of Parliament for Dorset. The second Baronet represented Poole and Weymouth and Melcombe Regis in the House of Commons. The title became extinct on his death in 1699.

== Morton baronets, of Milbourne St Andrew (1619) ==
- Sir George Morton, 1st Baronet (died 1662)
- Sir John Morton, 2nd Baronet (c. 1627–1699)
