= Richard Rose (MP) =

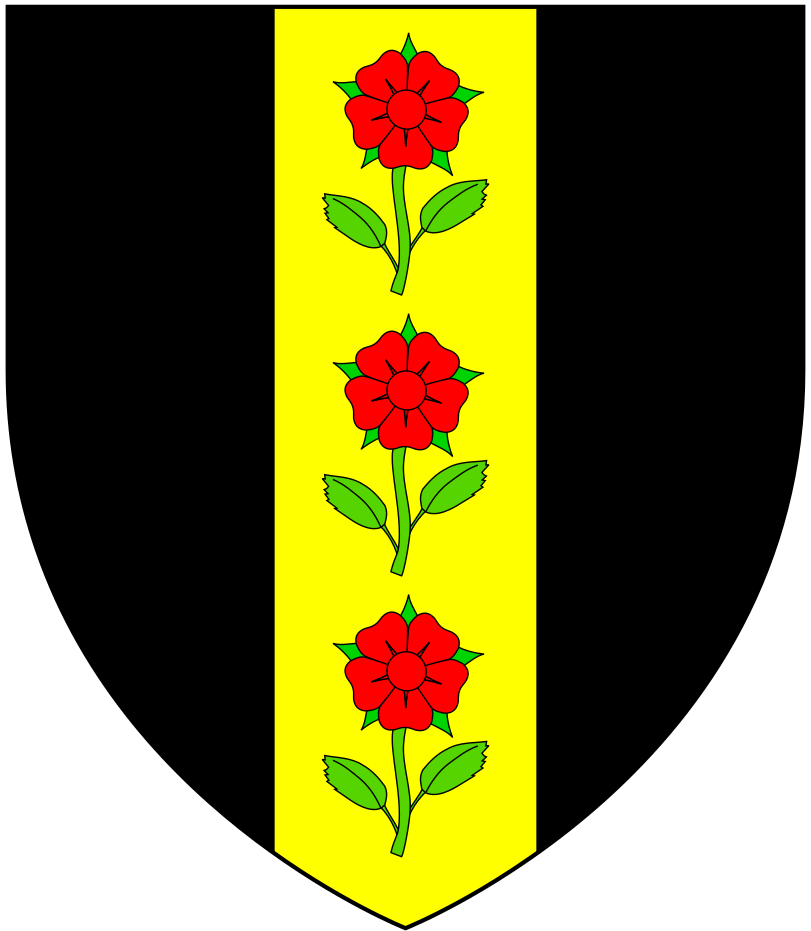
Canting arms of Rose of Wootton Fitzpaine in Dorset: Sable, on a pale or three roses gules slipt and leaved proper

Richard Rose (died ca. 1658) was an English merchant and politician who sat in the House of Commons from 1640 to 1648.

He was the son of John Rose of Lyme Regis, Dorset and his wife Faith Ellesdon. He was a draper and became Lord of the Manor of Wootton Fitzpaine.

In April 1640, Rose was elected Member of Parliament for Lyme Regis in the Short Parliament. He was re-elected MP for Lyme Regis for the Long Parliament in November 1640. Rose was not excluded from parliament in Pride's Purge in 1648, but was not recorded as sitting after it.

The will of Richard Rose of Wootton Fitzpaine was proved at the Probate Court of Canterbury on 19 February 1658.

Parliament of England
Vacant Parliament suspended since 1629	Member of Parliament for Lyme Regis; 1640–1648; With: Sir Walter Erle 1640; Edmund Prideaux 1640–1648	Succeeded by Edmund Prideaux
