= Lewis Dyve =

English Member of Parliament

Sir Lewis Dyve
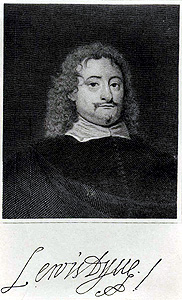
- Lewis Dyve Frontispiece to the Bedfordshire Historical Record.

Member of Parliament for Weymouth & Melcombe Regis
- In office 1628–1629

Member of Parliament for Bridport
- In office 1625–1626

Personal details
- Born: 3 November 1599
- Died: 1669 (aged 69–70)
- Spouse: Howarda Strangways (m. 1624)
- Children: 4
- Relatives: George Digby (half-brother)
- Military career
- Allegiance: Royalists
- Wars: English Civil War

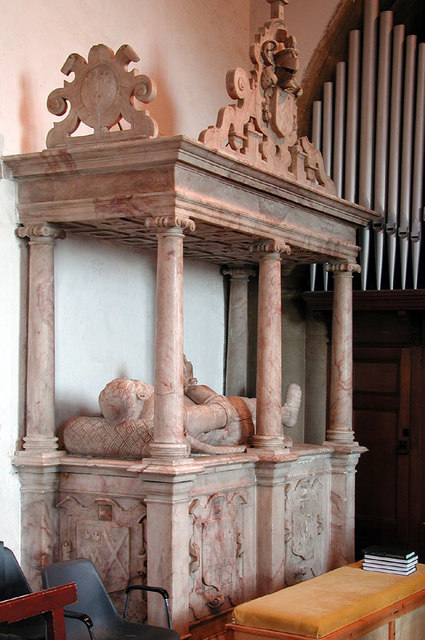
Monument to Sir Lewis Dyve, St Owen's Church, Bromham, Bedfordshire

Arms of Dyve: Gules, a fesse dancettée or between three escallops ermine

Sir Lewis Dyve (3 November 1599 – 1669) was an English Member of Parliament and a Royalist adherent during the English Civil War. His surname is sometimes also spelt Dive or Dives.

== Life ==
Dyve was born on 3 November 1599. He was the son of Sir John Dyve and Beatrix Walcot, who married secondly John Digby, 1st Earl of Bristol.

Dyve, who had an estate at Bromham in Bedfordshire, was knighted in 1620 and was one of the attendants of Prince Charles during his time at Madrid. He was elected MP for Bridport in the Parliaments of 1625 and 1626, and Weymouth in 1628. Some sources record him as having been once more chosen to represent Bridport in December 1640, but in fact, he seems to have been the defeated candidate petitioning the House of Commons against the result of the election; as he was the first disputed election to be heard in the Long Parliament, the committee which subsequently heard other election petitions was referred to as The Committee on Sir Lewis Dive for several years.

Dyve was concerned about printing and publishing his half-brother Lord Digby's speech on the attainder of the Earl of Strafford, for which the House of Commons resolved on 13 July 1641 that the books should be burned and ordered that Dyve should be arrested. At the outbreak of the Civil War he was concerned with a plan to admit the Royal forces to Hull, for which the Parliamentary governor, Sir John Hotham, ordered his arrest. Escaping the troops sent to seize him, he fled to Holland, but returned to England later the same year and was wounded at the Battle of Powick Bridge near Worcester. In 1643, the House of Commons voted for his impeachment for High Treason for raising money for the King and for referring to Parliament as "The Pretended Parliament"; Roger Hill, the Bridport MP whom he had tried to unseat in 1640, brought in the motion.

He served with Prince Rupert at the relief of Newark in 1644, and was then appointed sergeant-major-general in Dorset. In 1645 he succeeded in storming Weymouth, but could not take neighbouring Melcombe Regis, and when the Parliamentary garrison in Melcombe succeeded in seizing the baggage train that Goring had sent to Dyve they were able to recapture Weymouth.

Dyve was captured at the siege of Sherborne, and imprisoned in the Tower of London from 1645 to 1647. Being moved to the King's Bench, he escaped, but was recaptured at Preston. Imprisoned in Whitehall he escaped once more, according to his own account on the very day he was to have been executed; John Evelyn records in his Diary on 6 September 1651 that Dyve dined with him and related the story of his "leaping down out of a jakes two stories high into the Thames at high water, in the coldest of winter, and at night; so as by swimming he got to a boat that attended for him, though six musketeers guarded him." Dyve then went to Ireland where he once more served with the Royal forces; in 1650 he published an account of events in that country during the previous two years. He lost much of his fortune through his loyalty to the Crown, but also in part due to heavy gambling: in 1668, the year before he died, Samuel Pepys called him disapprovingly "a great gamester".

He married in 1624 Howarda, daughter of Sir John Strangways of Melbury House, Melbury Sampford, Dorset, and his first wife Grace Trenchard, and widow of Edward Rogers, by whom he had three sons and a daughter. His youngest son migrated to the English colony of Virginia. His descendants included the artist Giles Hussey and the courtier Charlotte Clayton Sundon.

== Bibliography ==
- House of Commons Journals at British History Online
- T. H. B. Oldfield, The Representative History of Great Britain and Ireland (London: Baldwin, Cradock & Joy, 1816)

Parliament of England
Preceded by William Muschamp; Robert Browne	Member of Parliament for Bridport; 1625–1626; With: Sir John Strode 1625; Sir Richard Strode 1625–1626	Succeeded by Thomas Pawlet; Bampfield Chafin
Preceded by Arthur Pyne; Giles Green; Bernard Michell; Sir John Strangways	Member of Parliament for Weymouth & Melcombe Regis; 1628–1629; With: Hugh Pyne; Sir Robert Napier; Henry Waltham	Parliament suspended until 1640
