= Robert Coker =

English politician

Robert Coker (c. 1617 – 23 September 1698) was an English politician who sat in the House of Commons at various times between 1656 and 1660.

Coker was the son of William Coker, of Mappowder, Dorset. He matriculated at Magdalen Hall, Oxford on 23 October 1635, aged 18 and studied law at the Middle Temple in 1637.

He was a justice of the peace for Dorset by 1646 until July 1688 and from November 1688 until his death. He was appointed High Sheriff of Dorset for 1646–47. In 1656, Coker was elected member of parliament for Dorset in the Second Protectorate Parliament. In 1660, he was re-elected MP for Dorset in the Convention Parliament.

Coker died at the age of 80 and was buried at Mappowder. He had married twice: firstly Joan, the daughter of John Browne of Frampton, with whom he had a daughter and secondly Mary, the daughter of Edward Hooper of Boveridge and widow of John Brune of Athelhampton, with whom he had 5 sons and a daughter.

Parliament of England
Preceded by William Sydenham; John Bingham; Sir Walter Earle; John Fitzjames; John Trenchard; Henry Henley	Member of Parliament for Dorset; 1656; With: William Sydenham; John Fitzjames; John Trenchard; James Dewey	Succeeded by Sir Walter Earle; John Bingham
