= Winsham =

Village and civil parish in Somerset, England

Coordinates: 50.853560°N 2.889928°W

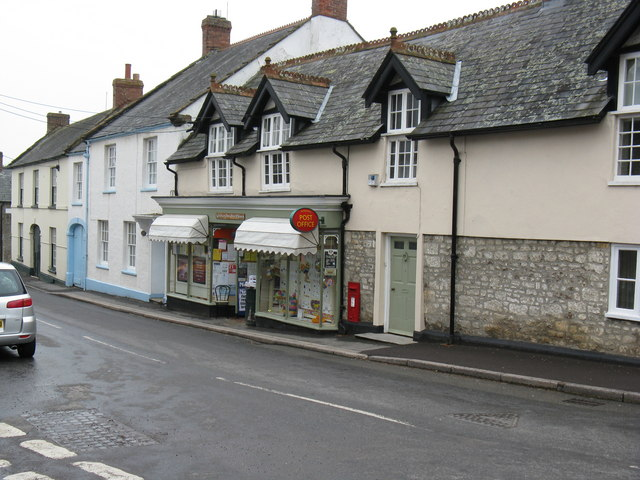
- Winsham Post Office and Store

- Location within Somerset
- Population: 748 (2011)
- OS grid reference: ST375062
- Unitary authority: Somerset Council
- Ceremonial county: Somerset
- Region: South West
- Country: England
- Sovereign state: United Kingdom
- Post town: CHARD
- Postcode district: TA20
- Dialling code: 01460
- Police: Avon and Somerset
- Fire: Devon and Somerset
- Ambulance: South Western
- UK Parliament: Yeovil

Winsham is a village and civil parish 4 miles (6 km) south-east of Chard and 6 miles (10 km) from Crewkerne, in Somerset, England. The parish, which has a population of approximately 750 residents living in some 335 households, includes the hamlets of Whatley, Bridge, Purtington and Ammerham, and covers an area of approximately 12 square miles (3,100 ha).

The village is on the southern border of Somerset, approximately 0.4 miles (0.64 km) from the Dorset border, which is marked by the River Axe. It has a Parish Council elected by residents, Winsham Parish Council was one of the first to be formed shortly after the passing of the Local Government Act 1894.

== History ==
The name Winsham means Wine's settlement.

In Saxon times the manor formed part of the estate of Wells Cathedral. The parish of Winsham was part of the Kingsbury Hundred.

With its roots in Saxon times, and its listing in the Domesday Book. Three estates had a major influence on Winsham's rural community Forde Abbey, Cricket St Thomas and Leigh House. The Fry family, the chocolate manufacturers from Bristol, who owned the Cricket St Thomas estate from 1897 until 1919, and the Hall family who followed them were particularly active in their support of the village.

The same is true of Leigh House where the Henley and Davies family also played an active part in village affairs. In the nineteenth century, the West of England Woollen Mill employed large numbers (said to be 600 at its peak). During that time it is believed that the population of Winsham increased to over a thousand. This boom was over by 1850, when the mill closed, having lost its business to the north of England. At a later date, it continued on reduced scale processing jute until the early twentieth century.

Both the village Pub, ’The Bell’, and the village run general store and Post Office have been in continuous business since at least 1850. Also in the centre of the village is the village hall, a gift to the village from Lord Bridport in 1887 to celebrate the Golden Jubilee of Queen Victoria. It is known as the Jubilee Hall.

The village school building dates back to 1818.

A more recent structure is the Sports and Social Club (with changing rooms), located on the larger of two recreation grounds near to the centre of the village. This building and the Upper Recreation Ground is managed by the Winsham Playing Fields Charity on a 99-year lease from Winsham Parish Council (dated 1968). The Charity is legally responsible for all the maintenance, upkeep and insurance of the Upper Rec and the Clubhouse. The 'Upper Rec' hosts various events such as the Annual Horticultural Show. It is also home to Winsham United Football Club which has been active since the late 19th Century.

== Governance ==
The parish council has responsibility for local issues, including setting an annual precept (local rate) to cover the council's operating costs and producing annual accounts for public scrutiny. The parish council evaluates local planning applications and works with the local police, district council officers, and neighbourhood watch groups on matters of crime, security, and traffic. The parish council's role also includes initiating projects for the maintenance and repair of parish facilities, as well as consulting with the district council on the maintenance, repair, and improvement of highways, drainage, footpaths, public transport, and street cleaning. Conservation matters (including trees and listed buildings) and environmental issues are also the responsibility of the council. In September 2017 the Parish Council was awarded Foundation status by the National Association of Local Councils for demonstrating excellent governance, development of councillors and employees, and good engagement. As of 2024 the Parish Council continues to hold this status, at least until the next elections.

For local government purposes, since 1 April 2023, the parish comes under the unitary authority of Somerset Council. Prior to this, it was part of the non-metropolitan district of South Somerset (established under the Local Government Act 1972). It was part of Chard Rural District before 1974.

The village is in the 'Windwhistle' electoral ward. Winsham is the most populous area in the ward but this stretches east to West Crewkerne and north to Dowlish Wake. The total population of the ward taken from the 2011 census was 2,293.

It is also part of the Yeovil county constituency represented in the House of Commons of the Parliament of the United Kingdom. It elects one Member of Parliament (MP) by the first past the post system of election.

== Religious sites ==
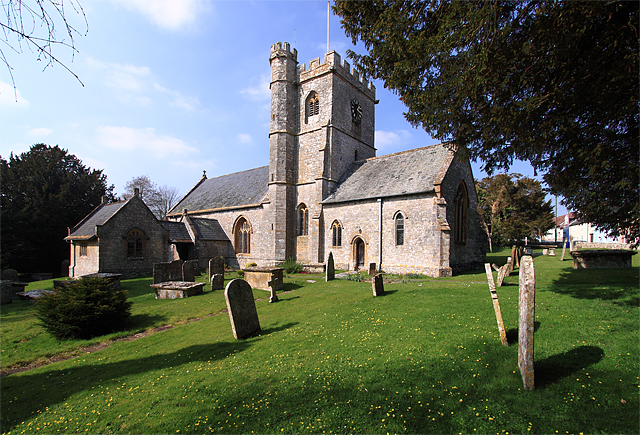
Church of St Stephen

The Church of St Stephen originates from the 13th century, though mostly 15th century with 19th century restoration. Designated by English Heritage as a Grade II* listed building. St. Stephen's is an historically important site which attracts many visitors from around the world - it contains a pre-Reformation tympanum (rood screen) of the Crucifixion, and is only one of two to survive anywhere. It also has a copy of Fox's Book of Martyrs, and other interesting features.

The United Reformed Church dates back to the early 19th Century. Non-conformism has had a substantial following in the parish since the 17th Century. A number of fascinating historical documents relating to the URC in Winsham can be found on the Winsham Web Museum.
