= John Fitzjames (MP) =

English politician

Sir John Fitzjames (31 December 1619 – 21 June 1670) was an English politician who sat in the House of Commons at various times between 1654 and 1670.

He was the son of Leweston Fitzjames of Leweston, Dorset and matriculated at Magdalen College, Oxford, on 4 March 1636, aged 16. He was the brother of Thomas Fitzjames and Henry Fitzjames. He succeeded his father to the Leweston estate in 1638.

He was a Parliamentarian Colonel of horse in 1644–46, during the Civil War. He was appointed High Sheriff of Dorset for 1645–46 and was a justice of the peace for Dorset from 1648 to 1652 and from 1656 to his death.

In 1654 he was elected member of parliament for Dorset in the First Protectorate Parliament and was re-elected MP for Dorset in 1656 for the Second Protectorate Parliament. In 1659, he was elected MP for Poole in the Third Protectorate Parliament until his election was declared void on 23 March. In April 1660 Fitzjames was elected MP for Dorset in the Convention Parliament. He was knighted on 9 July 1660. In 1661 he was re-elected MP for Poole in the Cavalier Parliament and sat until his death in 1670.

Fitzjames was buried at Long Burton on 23 June 1670. He had married Margaret, the daughter of Nathaniel Stephens of Eastington, Gloucestershire, with whom he had 2 sons (who both predeceased him) and 5 daughters. The Leweston estate was divided between his daughters, but reconsolidated by Sir George Strode, one of Fitzjames' sons-in-law.

Parliament of England
Preceded by William Sydenham; John Bingham	Member of Parliament for Dorset; 1654–1656; With: William Sydenham; John Bingham; John Trenchard; Sir Walter Earle 1654; Henry Henley 1654; Robert Coker 1656; James Dewey 1656	Succeeded by Sir Walter Earle; John Bingham
Preceded by Edward Boteler	Member of Parliament for Poole; 1659; With: Samuel Bond	Succeeded by John Pyne
