= Ernest Frederick Cambridge Lane =

British-South African official (1882 – 1958)

Ernest Frederick Cambridge Lane, CMG, JP (11 November 1882 – 6 January 1958) was a British-South African official who served as the private secretary of Jan Smuts. He was nicknamed 'Long Lane'.

The eldest son of Frederick George Alexander Lane, Ernest Lane went to South Africa, where he became private secretary to Jan Smuts in 1904, in addition to serving as his aide-de-camp during the South West Africa campaign. It was while he we was here that he met and married his wife, Jessie Heys. They married in St Alban the Martyr Anglican church, Pretoria now known as St Albans Cathedral, Pretoria, on the 17 May 1911

Lane then served with the South African Heavy Artillery, but was recalled to France to serve as principal private secretary to Smuts, who was then a member of the British war cabinet. Lane subsequently became head of the prime minister's department when Smuts became prime minister of the Union. He accompanied Smuts to the signature of the Paris Peace Treaty, and was appointed a CMG in 1920.

In 1929, Lane went to Northern Rhodesia as the local representative of the British South Africa Company.

He retired to Dorset, where his family had its roots, in 1934. He was a member of the Dorset County Council from 1936 to 1955. He served as Sheriff of Dorsetshire in 1943.
