= Thomas Erle (1621–1650) =

English lawyer and politician

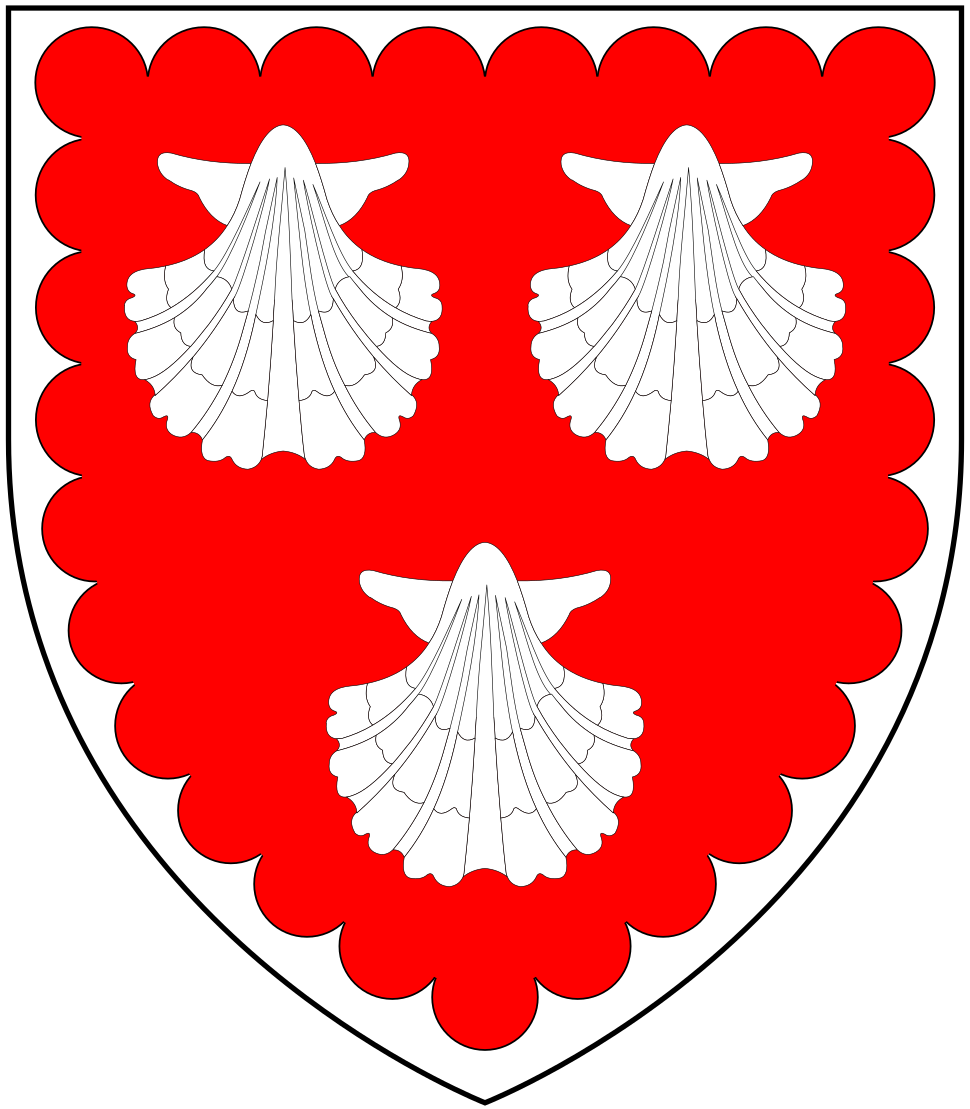
Arms of Erle: Gules, three escallops argent a bordure engrailed of the last

Thomas Erle (1621 – 1 June 1650) was an English lawyer and politician who sat in the House of Commons from 1640 to 1648. He supported the Parliamentarian cause in the English Civil War.

Erle was the son of Sir Walter Erle (1586–1665) of Charborough House, Dorset, and his wife Ann Dymoke, daughter of Francis Dymoke. He matriculated at Magdalen Hall, Oxford on 18 February 1636, aged 14.

In April 1640, Erle was elected Member of Parliament for Milborne Port in the Short Parliament. He was elected MP for Wareham for the Long Parliament in November 1640. He sat until 1648 when he was excluded in Pride's Purge.

Erle was called to the bar at Middle Temple in 1647 and was a friend of Anthony Ashley Cooper, the future Earl of Shaftesbury. He was chosen as a commissioner on the trial of the King in 1649 but did not sit.

Erle died in 1650, a number of years before his father.

Erle married Susanna Fiennes, daughter of William Fiennes, 3rd Viscount Saye and Sele. Their children included General Thomas Erle who was one of those who helped instigate the Glorious Revolution.

Parliament of England
Parliament suspended since 1629	Member of Parliament for Milborne Port; 1640; With: Edward Kyrton	Succeeded by Edward Kyrton; Lord Digby
Preceded by John Trenchard; Dr Gilbert Jones	Member of Parliament for Wareham; 1640–1648; With: John Trenchard	Succeeded by John Trenchard
