= Leigh House =

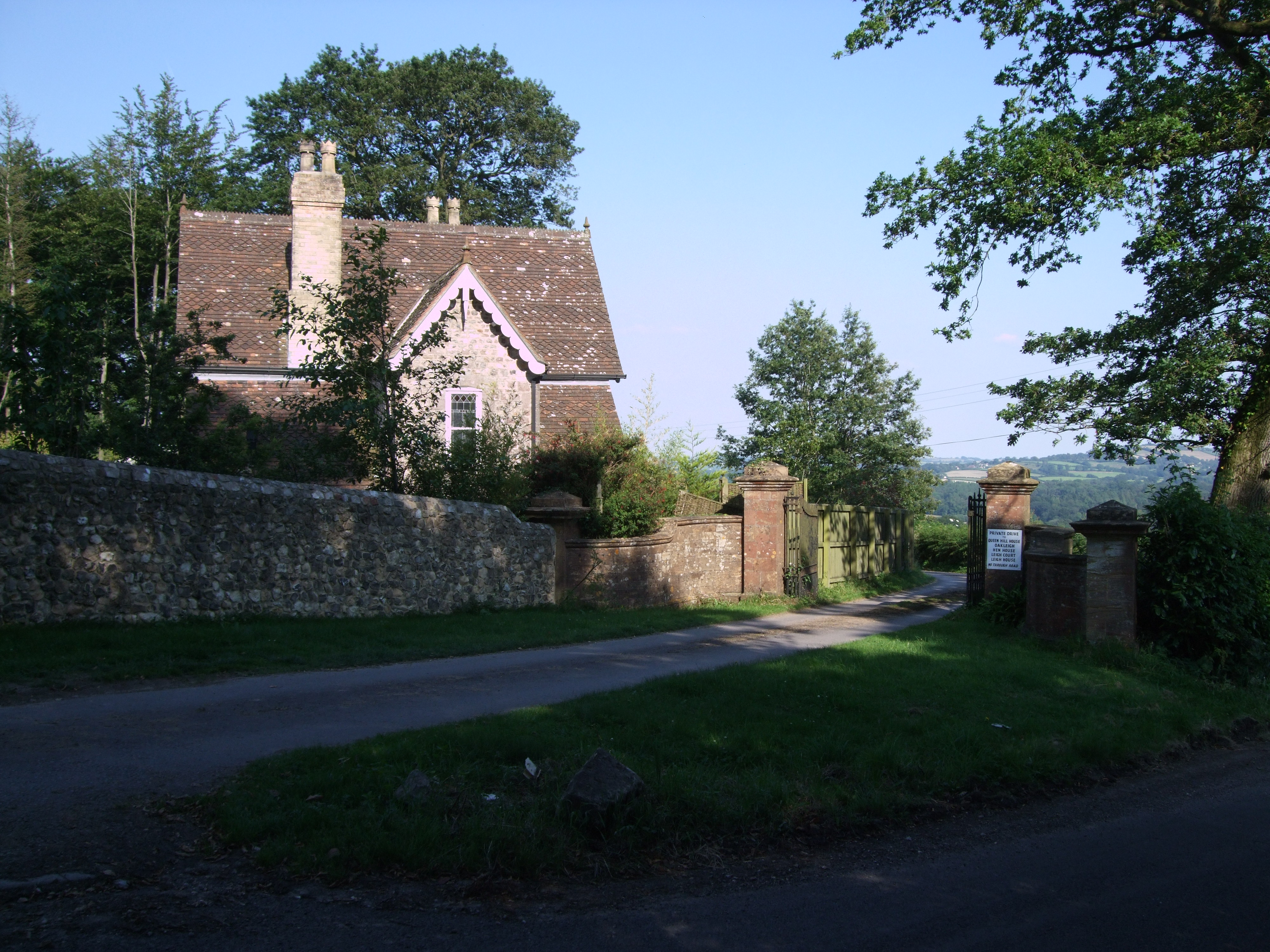
- Entrance to Leigh House

- Location within Somerset
- 50°51′06″N 2°54′59″W
- Location: Winsham, Somerset, England

History
- Built: 1617

Listed Building – Grade II*
- Official name: Leigh House
- Designated: 4 February 1958
- Reference no.: 1056141

Leigh House is a 16th- or 17th-century house in Winsham, Somerset, England. It is a Grade II* listed building.

The site was previously part of the Forde Abbey estate until the dissolution of the monasteries, and was then bought by the Henley family, who built the house at some point between 1590 and 1617. Henry Henley (1612–1696) was an English politician who sat in the House of Commons at various times between 1653 and 1681. He supported the Parliamentary cause in the English Civil War. In 1759, the house was let to Robert Hanning.

It is made of local lias stone with Hamstone dressings. It is E-shaped, with the five-bay east elevation having two storeys with attics above them. The north and south sides are of six bays. The main room on the ground floor is the Great Hall which, along with other rooms, still contains original large fireplaces.

The house was modified in 1893, and then sold by the descendants of the Henley family in 1919. Subsequent owners included the local MP George Davies. After his death, many of the furnishings of the house were sold at auction. The house has since been divided into four residences.
