= John Digby (1618–1664) =

English politician (1618-1664)

John Digby (1618 – 17 March 1664) was an English politician who sat in the House of Commons from 1640 to 1642. He fought on the Royalist side in the English Civil War and died as a priest at a convent in France.

Digby was born in London, the son of John Digby, 1st Earl of Bristol, and his wife Beatrix Walcot, daughter of Charles Walcot of Walcot Shropshire. He matriculated at Magdalen College, Oxford, on 12 May 1634, aged 16.

In November 1640, Digby was elected Member of Parliament for Milborne Port in the Long Parliament. In 1641 after his brother George Digby was accelerated to the House of Lords, John perched himself on a ladder at the door of the chamber which the speaker, William Lenthall took as an act of disrespect and insubordination and told him to take his place, and not to sit upon the ladder as if he were going to be hanged. Another MP Richard King complained that the Speaker had transgressed his duty in using so disgraceful a speech to so noble a gentleman and after some turmoil obtained a conditional apology.

During the civil war Digby supported the King and was disabled on 5 August 1642. He was a general of horse under Ralph, Lord Hopton.

In 1660, Digby "a most holy devout person" became a priest at a convent of English Benedictines at Pontoise which was built that year. In March 1666 members of the community including Digby planned a visit to England. It was noted that "Mr Digby was a severe man to himself, and fasted Lent most strictly and having a great weakness in his head by the many wounds he had received in the wars, was subject to pains in his head in those wounds; and fasting this Lent with nothing but a mess of peas porridge and bread, being a corpulant man became weak of his head by it. And some day or two before the designed journey, in the night fell into an apoplex, was annealed and died the next day." The convent at Pontoise contained his tomb which was inscribed "Hic jacet umbra, et pulvis, et nihil."

Parliament of England
Preceded by Edward Kyrton; Thomas Earl	Member of Parliament for Milborne Port; 1640–1642; With: Edward Kyrton	Succeeded by William Carent; Thomas Grove
