= High Sheriff of Dorset =

Official in an English county

The High Sheriff of Dorset is an ancient high sheriff title which has been in existence for over one thousand years. Until 1567 the Sheriff of Somerset was also the Sheriff of Dorset.

On 1 April 1974, under the provisions of the Local Government Act 1972, the title of Sheriff of Dorset was retitled High Sheriff of Dorset.

The position was once a powerful position responsible for collecting taxes and enforcing law and order in Dorset. In modern times the high sheriff has become a ceremonial role, presiding over public ceremonies.

== List of Sheriffs of Dorset ==
=== 1066–1226 ===
- Hugh fitz Grip
- 1086 Aiulf the Chamberlain
- From 1226 to 1567 – See Sheriffs of Somerset and Dorset

=== 1567–1599 ===
- 18 November 1567: Robert Coker
- 18 November 1568: Robert Williams
- 12 November 1569: John Young, of Melbury Sampford
- 13 November 1570: William Huddye
- 14 November 1571: Henry Uvdale
- 13 November 1572: John Strode, of Parnham
- 10 November 1573: Richard Rogers, of Bryanston
- 15 November 1574: Sir John Horsey, of Clifton
- 15 November 1575: Sir Matthew Arrundel, of Wiltshire
- 13 November 1576: William Webbe, of Motcombe
- 12 November 1577: Nicholas Turbervill, of Bere
- 17 November 1578: Thomas Mullins
- 23 November 1579: Thomas Chaffin, of Chettle
- 21 November 1580: George Trenchard, of Woolton
- 27 November 1581: Nicholas Martin, of Athelhampton
- 5 December 1582: John Williams, of Herringston House, Winterborne Herringston
- 25 November 1583: Thomas Strangeways
- 19 November 1584: Henry Coker, of Mappowder Court
- 22 November 1585: Sir John Horsey, of Clifton Maybank
- 14 November 1586: Christopher Percy
- 4 December 1587: Sir? Richard Rogers
- 25 November 1588: Robert Frampton
- 24 November 1589: John Brown, of Frampton
- 24 November 1590: Thomas Chaffin
- 25 November 1591: Sir Ralph Horsey, of Clifton Maybank
- 16 November 1592: John Williams
- 26 November 1593: George Morton
- 21 November 1594: Robert Strode
- 27 November 1595: Thomas Hussey, of Shapwick
- 22 November 1596: Sir George Trenchard
- 25 November 1597: Thomas Freke, of Iwerne Courtnay (alias Shroton)
- 28 November 1598: George Morton
- 2 December 1599: Robert Miller, of Little Bredy

=== 1600–1699 ===
- 24 November 1600: Thomas Uvedale
- 2 December 1601: John Stocker
- 7 December 1602: John Rogers
- 1 December 1603: John Fitzjames, of Leweston
- 5 November 1604: John Tregonwell, of Milton
- 2 February 1606: John Ryves, of Blandford
- 17 November 1606: Sir Robert Napier, of Middlemarsh Hall, Minterne Magna
- 9 November 1607: Sir William Webb
- 12 November 1608: Christopher Anketil
- 1609: Sir Edmund Uvedale, of Little Crichel
- 6 November 1610: John Henning, of Pokeswell
- 1611: Sir Thomas Freke, of Iwerne Courtnay (alias Shroton)
- 1612: Sir John Strangeways, of Melbury Sampford and Abbotsbury
- 1613: Robert Coker
- 1614: Sir John Hanham, of Wimborne Minster
- 6 November 1615: John Brewyne, of Adlamstone
- 11 November 1616: John Tregonwel
- 6 November 1617: Sir John Browne
- 9 November 1618: Sir Walter Erle, of Charborough
- 1619: Sir Anthony Ashley
- 6 November 1620: Sir Nathaniel Napier, of More Crichel
- 1621: Sir Edward Lawrence
- 7 November 1622: John Harbin
- 1623: Arthur Radford
- 1623: William Francis
- 1624: Bampfield Chafin, of Folke
- 1625: Francis Caldecot
- 1626: Sir William Uvedell
- 7 November 1627: Leweston Fitzjames, of Leweston
- 1628: Thomas Still, of Redlinch
- 1629: Angell Grey, of Stinsford
- 7 November 1630: Sir John Meller, of Little Bredy
- 1631: Brian Williams
- 1632: John Browne, of Dorchester and Frampton
- 10 November 1633: William Colyer, of Pidle
- 5 November 1634: Sir Thomas Trenchard, of Wolveton, Charminster
- 1635: John Freke, of Cerne Abbey and Westbrooke House, Upwey
- 3 October 1636: Richard Rogers
- 30 September 1637: Sir John Croke, of Payne's Place, Motcombe
- 4 November 1638: Richard Bingham, of Melcomb
- 1639: William Churchill
- 1640: Sir William Uvedale
- 1641: Edward Lawrence, of Creech Grange, Steeple
- 1642: Anthony Ashley Cooper, of Wimborne St Giles
- 1642–1644: Sir Francis Fulford, of Toller Fratrum
- 1645: Hubert Hussey, of Sydling
- 1645: John Fitzjames, of Leweston
- 1 December 1646: Edward Hooper
- 28 December 1646: Robert Coker, of Mappowder Court
- 17 November 1647: William Savadge
- 28 November 1648: Henry Henley, of Leigh, Winsham, Somerset and Colway, Lyme Regis
- 7 November 1649: John Still
- 7 November 1650: Sir Gerrard Napier, 1st Baronet, of Middlemarsh Grange, Minterne Magna
- 4 November 1651: Sir Hugh Wyndham, 1st Baronet
- 12 November 1652: John Turbervile, of Beere
- 10 November 1653: Arthur Radford
- 1654: Edmund Okeden
- 1655: James Gould, of Dorchester
- 1656: John Michell
- 1657: John Strode, of Parnham
- 5 November 1660: Thomas Fownes
- 1661: Sir John Rogers
- 1662: Woolley Meller
- 1663 Thomas Freke, of Shroton and Melcombe Horsey
- 1664: Robert Swayne
- 12 November 1665: Roger Clavel
- 7 November 1666: John Brown
- 6 November 1667: John Tregonell, of Milton
- late 1667: John Jeffery
- 6 November 1668: John Tregonell, of Milton
- 11 November 1669: Robert Barber
- 4 November 1670: Robert Seymour
- 9 November 1671: Thomas Moore, of Hawkchurch
- 11 November 1672: Michael Harvey, of Clifton Maybank
- 12 November 1673: William Frampton
- 5 November 1674: John Bingham
- June 1675: John Michel, of Kingston Russell
- 15 November 1675: Thomas Gollop
- 10 November 1676: John Every, of Wootton Glanville
- 15 November 1677: Robert Pelham
- 14 November 1678: William Weston, of Weston
- 23 November 1678: John Hardy
- 27 November 1678: William Laurence
- late 1678: Robert Larder
- 13 November 1679: William Weston, of Weston
- 4 November 1680: George Pitt
- late 1680: Sir Robert Napier, 1st Baronet, of Punknoll
- 10 November 1681: George Ryves, of Ranston
- 13 November 1682: Robert Browne
- 12 November 1683: Charles Bruine
- late 1683: George Fulford, of Toller Fratrum
- 20 November 1684: William Lewis, of Houke or Stoake
- 30 November 1685: Charles Bruine
- 25 November 1686: Thomas Turberville
- 5 December 1687: James Gould, of Dorchester
- 8 November 1688: Sir Nathaniel Napier, 2nd Baronet
- 29 November 1688: John Estman, of Sherbourne
- 4 Apr 1689: ? Napier
- 11 April 1689: Sir Andrew Henley, 1st Baronet
- 18 November 1689: John Still, of Shaston St James
- 27 November 1690: Andrew Tucker
- 14 December 1691: John Hoskyns
- 21 December 1691: Richard Rose
- 17 November 1692: John Hoskyns
- 28 November 1692: John Strode, of Netherbury
- 16 November 1693: Thomas Skinner
- 30 November 1693: Thomas Cooper, of Sherborne
- 6 December 1694: William Bennet
- 5 December 1695: Sir Thomas Hardy
- 17 December 1696: Thomas Bower
- 23 December 1696: William Whitaker
- 30 December 1697: William Cox, of Brockhampton
- 17 January 1698: Nicholas Romayne, of Lidlinch
- 22 December 1698: John Richards
- 6 January 1699: William Okeden, of Little Crichel
- 20 November 1699: Robert Swayne

=== 1701–1799 ===
- 28 November 1700: William Fitz
- 1 January 1702: John Richards
- 2 February 1702: Nicholas Hardy, of Woolcomb
- 3 December 1702: John Richards
- 14 December 1702: Edward Clavell
- 2 December 1703: John Richards, of Walworth
- 20 December 1703: Thomas Skinner
- 21 December 1704: Thomas Turberville
- 15 February 1705: John Gould, of Milburn
- early 1705: Harry Chafyn
- 3 December 1705: William Whitaker
- 14 November 1706: William Hull
- 20 November 1707: Nicholas Brown
- 29 November 1708: Charles Brinn
- 1 December 1709: Richard Swain
- 24 November 1710: Edward Hooper
- 30 November 1710: George Richards, of Long Bredy
- 13 December 1711: John Tregonwell
- 12 January 1712: Anthony Larder
- 11 December 1712: George Reeves
- 5 January 1713: John Clutterbuck, of Punknole
- 30 November 1713: Richard White
- 16 November 1714: Thomas Rose, of Wootton Fitzpaine
- 5 December 1715: Nicolas Cary
- 12 November 1716: Fitzwalter Foy, of Bewley
- 21 December 1717: Samuel Whetcombe
- 21 December 1718: John Gollop jnr
- 6 January 1719: Alexander Thistlethwaite
- 3 December 1719: Edmund Seymour
- 7 January 1720: Edward Seymour
- 3 January 1721: John Meech
- 14 January 1721: Henry Henly
- 20 January 1721: John Meech
- 14 December 1721: William Richards, of Warmell
- 11 December 1722: Richard Henvill
- 7 January 1724: Robert Henley
- 10 December 1724: Richard Churchill, of Compton
- 22 December 1724: Richard Churchill jnr, of Compton
- 13 January 1726 Thomas Gundry, of Dewlish
- 29 November 1726: John Hawles Johnson
- 16 December 1727: Richard Perry, of Busses, died in office
- 18 December 1728: George Dawbenny, of Bishops Candle
- 22 January 1730: Sydenham Williams, of Herringston
- 14 December 1730: Charles Brune
- 8 December 1731: William Mills, of Mearehay
- 14 December 1732: Sir William Napier, 4th Baronet
- 20 December 1733: William Clapcott
- 19 December 1734: Edmund Hayter, of East Creech
- 18 December 1735: Samuel Serrell, of the Isle of Purbeck
- 19 January 1737: Henry Whitaker, of Motcombe
- 12 January 1738: Henry Bower
- 21 December 1738: William Smith, of Sidling
- 27 December 1739: Thomas Dibben, of Powerstock
- 24 December 1740: Sydenham Williams
- 31 December 1741: Robert Barber, of Ashmore
- 16 December 1742: James Forster, of Blandford St Mary
- 5 January 1744: James Frampton, of Moreton
- 10 January 1745: George Gollop, of Swyre
- 16 January 1746: Benjamin Adney, of Loders
- 15 January 1747: Robert Goodden, of Over Compton
- 14 January 1748: Samuel Whitcomb, of Lilington
- 11 January 1749: Julines Beckford, of Steepleton Iwerne
- 17 January 1750: Azariah Pinney, of Bettiscombe
- 6 December 1750: Swayne Harbin, of Gunville
- 14 January 1752: Thomas Ryves, of Ranston
- 7 February 1753: Humphrey Sturt, of Horton
- 31 January 1754: Awnsham Churchill, of Henbury
- 29 January 1755: Thomas Strode, of Beaminster
- 27 January 1756: Harry Meggs, of Bradford Peveril
- 4 February 1757: John Gannett jnr, of Blandford
- 27 January 1758: Nicholas Gould, of West Stafford
- 2 February 1759: John Damer, of Carne
- 1 February 1760: Ralph Willett, of Merley
- 28 January 1761: William Pitt, of Kingston
- 15 February 1762: Edmund Morton Pleydell, of Milburn
- 4 February 1763: William Richards jnr, of Warmwell
- 10 February 1764: John Pretor Pinney, of Dorchester
- 1 February 1765: John Pinney, of Blackdown
- 17 February 1766: Thomas Robinson, of Coombe Keynes
- 13 February 1767: William Churchill, of Dorchester
- 15 January 1768: James Gollop, of Barwick
- 27 January 1769: William Thorpe Holder, of Langton Long Blandford
- 9 February 1770: James Dale, of Blandford
- 6 February 1771: John Newton, of Spetisbury
- 17 February 1772: John Smith, of Sydling St Nicholas
- 8 February 1773: Henry Cornish Henley, of Colway
- 7 February 1774: Harvey Ekins, of Bere Regis
- 6 February 1775: George Gould, of Upway
- 5 February 1776: John Meech, of Dorchester
- 21 February 1776: William Taunton, of Stratton
- 31 January 1777: Richard Bingham, of Melcomb Horsey
- 10 February 1777: George Snow, of Langton Long Blandford
- 28 January 1778: William Trenchard, of Bloxworth
- 1 February 1779: Robert Goodden, of Over Compton
- 2 February 1780: Peter Beckford, of Steepleton
- 5 February 1781: Lewis Dymock Grosvenor Tregonwell, of Dorchester
- 1 February 1782: William Churchill, of Henbury
- 10 February 1783: Francis John Browne, of Frampton, near Dorchester
- 9 February 1784: Isaac Sage, of Thornhill
- 7 February 1785: Lionel Damer, of Warmwell
- 13 February 1786: Henry William Portman, of Bryanstone
- 12 February 1787: Peter William Baker, of Ranston House, near Blandford
- 8 February 1788: Anthony Chapman, of Holnest
- 29 April 1789: Frederick Thomas Wentworth, of Henbury
- 29 January 1790: Henry William Fitch, of High Hall
- 4 February 1791: John Calcraft, of Rempston
- 23 February 1791: Sir Stephen Nash, of Leweston
- 1 June 1792: Mark Davis, of Holnest
- 6 February 1793: James Frampton, of Moreton
- 5 February 1794: Edward Buckley Batson, of Sixpenny Handley
- 11 February 1795: Edward Greathed, of Uddings
- 5 February 1796: Thomas Bowyer Bower, of Iwern Minster
- 1 February 1797: William Richards jnr, later Clavell, of Smedmore
- 7 February 1798: Edward Berkeley Portman, of Bryanston
- 1 February 1799: John Calcraft, of Rempston
- 8 February 1799: Henry Seymour, of Handford

=== 1800–1899 ===
- 5 February 1800: Richard Erle-Drax-Grosvenor, of Charborough Park
- 11 February 1801: Thomas Rose Drew, of Wootton Fitzpaine
- 3 February 1802: Edmund Morton Pleydell, of Whatcombe
- 3 February 1803: John Arbuthnot, of Weymouth
- 10 February 1803: Josiah Wedgwood, of Tarrant Gunville
- 1 February 1804: Robert Williams of Bridehead, Littlebredy
- 6 February 1805: John Gould, of Upway
- 1 February 1806: Edward Williams, of Herringstone
- 4 February 1807: Arthur Cozens, of Yetminster
- 3 February 1808: Nicholas Charles Daniel, of Upway
- 6 February 1809: James John Farquharson, of Langton
- 31 January 1810: Henry Seymer, of Hanford
- 8 February 1811: Edward Greathed, of Udden
- 24 January 1812: Thomas Horlock Bastard, of Charlton Marshall
- 10 February 1813: Robert Radclyffe, of Winterborne Zelston
- 4 February 1814: Sir John Wyldbore Smith, 2nd Baronet, of Sydling St Nicholas
- 13 February 1815: George Smith, of Spettisbury
- 12 February 1816: John Herbert Browne, of Weymouth
- 12 February 1817: Sir William Oglander, 6th Baronet, of Parnham
- 24 January 1818: John Disney, of Corscombe
- 10 February 1819: George Purling, of Bradford
- 12 February 1820: Thomas Billett, of Warmwell
- 6 February 1821: John White, of Up Cerne
- 4 February 1822: Sir Evan Nepean, 1st Baronet, of Loders
- 15 November 1822: Andrew Bain, of Heffleton
- 31 January 1823: Henry Charles Sturt, of Crichel House, Wimborne
- 31 January 1824: George Garland, of Stone
- 2 February 1825: Christopher Spurrier, of Upton
- 30 January 1826: Charles Buxton, of Wyke Regis
- 5 February 1827: John Bingley Garland, of Stone Cottage, Wimborne
- 13 February 1828: William Gill Paxton, of Coombe Almer
- 11 February 1829: William Boucher, of The Close, Salisbury
- 2 February 1830: John Bond, of Creech Grange
- 31 January 1831: Henry Dawson-Damer, of Milton Abbey
- 6 February 1832: Sir Edward Baker, 2nd Baronet, of Ranston
- 1833: Richard Brouncker, of Boveridge
- 1834: Edward Doughty, of Upton
- 1835: Sir Henry Digby, of Minterne Magna
- 1836: John Stein, of Chalmington
- 1837: James Chamness Fyler, of Heffleton Lodge
- 1838: Richard Brinsley Sheridan, of Frampton House
- 1839: Joseph Weld of East Lulworth
- 1840: John Samuel Wanley Sawbridge-Erle-Drax, of Charborough Park
- 1841: Sir Richard Glyn, 2nd Baronet, of Gaunt's House
- 1842: Henry Ker Seymer, of Hanford
- 1843: James Charles Dale, of Glanvilles Wootton
- 1844: John Floyer, of West Stafford
- 1845: Edward Balston of Corfe Hill, Radipole
- 1846: Charles Porcher, of Cliffe House
- 1847: Thomas Bowyer Bower, of Iwerne Minster
- 1848: John Gooden, of Over Compton
- 1849: William Parry Okeden, of Turnworth
- 1850: Henry Ralph Willett, of Merley House, Wimborne Minster
- 1851: Francis Pitney Brouncker Martin, of Kingston House, Dorchester
- 1852: Augustus Foster, of Warmwell
- 1853: William Bragge, of Sadborow
- 1854: Sir Henry Oglander, 7th Baronet, of Parham
- 1855: Robert Williams, of Bridehead
- 1856: Charles James Radclyffe, of Hyde, Bere Regis
- 1857: Hastings Nathaniel Middleton, of Bradford Peverell, near Dorchester
- 1858: George Frederick William Miles, of Ford Abbey
- 1859: James Fellowes, of Kingston House
- 1860: George Digby Wingfield Digby, of Sherborne Castle
- 1861: Robert Hassall Swaffield, of West Down Lodge, Wyke Regis
- 1862: Joseph Gundry, of the Hyde, Bridport
- 1863: George Whieldon, of Wyke Hall, Gillingham
- 1864: Charles Wriothesly Digby, of Studland
- 1865: John Brymer, of Ilsington Hall
- 1866: St John Coventry of Knowle, Wimborne
- 1867: John Hales Calcraft, of Rempstone Hall
- 1868: Charles Joseph Parke, of Henbury
- 1869: Sir Richard George Glyn, 3rd Baronet, of Gaunts House.
- 1870: Hector Monro, of Edmondsham
- 1871: John Tregonwell, of Cranborne Lodge
- 1872: Edward Joseph Weld of Lulworth Castle
- 1873: Sir Molyneux Hyde Nepean, 2nd Baronet of Loder's Court
- 1874: John William Townsend Fyler, of Heffleton
- 1875: Sir William Henry Smith-Marriott, 5th Baronet of Sydling and Down House
- 1876: John Clavell Mansel-Pleydell, of Longthorns
- 1877: Ernest Clay Ker-Seymer, of Hanford
- 1878: Montague Williams, of Woolland
- 1879: James John Farquharson, of Langton
- 1880: Walter Ralph Bankes, of Kingston Lacy
- 1881: John Batten, of Upcerne, Dorchester
- 1882: Charles J. T. Hambro of Milton Abbey, Blandford
- 1883: Thomas Holford, of Castle Hill
- 1884: Lieutenant-General Augustus Henry Lane Fox Pitt Rivers, of Rushmore.
- 1885: Charles James Radclyffe, of Hyde, Bere Regis
- 1886: Thomas Merthyr Guest, of Inwood, Henstridge
- 1887: William Ernest Brymer, of Ilsington House
- 1888: George Troyte-Bullock, of North Coker House
- 1889: Sir Frederick John William Johnstone, of Arlington Street, London
- 1890: John Robert Phelips Goodden, of Compton House, Sherborne
- 1891: Marwood Shuttleworth Yeatman, of Holwell Manor House, Sherborne, Esq.
- 1892: James Herbert Fellowes, of Kingston Park, Dorchester
- 1893: Algernon Thomas Brinsley Sheridan, of Frampton Court
- 1894: Montague Scott Williams, of Woolland House, Blandford
- 1895: William Herbert Evans, of Forde Abbey, Thorncombe, near Chard
- 1896: Arthur Martin, of Manor House, Rampisham, Dorchester
- 1897: Sir Henry Peto, 2nd Baronet, of Cheddington Court, Crewkerne, Somerset
- 1898: William Montagu Calcraft, of Rempstone House, Wareham
- 1899: William Colfox, of Westmead, Bridport

=== 1900–1973 ===
- 1900: Captain Richard Baynton Foster, of Lambert House, Dorchester
- 1901 Captain Edward Wilmot Williams, of Herringstone House, Dorchester
- 1902 Colonel John Bullen Symes Bullen, of Catherston Leweston, Charmouth
- 1903 Colonel John Mount Batten of Upcerne House, Dorchester
- 1904 Hastings Burton Middleton, of Bradford Peverell, Dorchester
- 1905 Reginald Douglas Thornton, of Birkin House, Dorchester
- 1906 Henry Stilwell, of Steepleton Manor, Dorchester
- 1907 Humphrey Frederick Weld, of Chideock Manor, Bridport
- 1908 Charles Ethelston Parke, of Henbury House, Wimborne
- 1909 Alexander Edward Lane Fox Pitt-Rivers, of Hinton St. Mary, Sturminster Newton
- 1910 Hector Edmond Monro, of Edmondsham House, Cranborne, Salisbury
- 1911 George Hamilton Fletcher, of Leweston Manor, Slierborne
- 1912 James Hainsworth Ismay, of Iwerne Minster House, Blandford
- 1913 Henry Frank Ward Farquharson, of Eastbury Park, Tarrant Gunville, Blandford
- 1914 Frederick James Bosworth Wingfield-Digby, of Sherborne Castle, Sherborne
- 1915 Lieutenant-Colonel Philip Farrer, of Binnegar Hall, East Stoke, Wareham
- 1916 Frederick George Alexander Lane, of Bloxworth House, Wareham
- 1917 Freeman Roper, of Forde Abbey, Chard
- 1918 Alban James Woodroffe, of Ware House, Lyme Regis
- 1919 William Llewellin of Upton House, near Poole
- 1920 Lt.-Col. Thomas Alfred Colfox of Coneygar, Bridport
- 1921 Major Joseph Gundry, of The Hyde, Bridport
- 1922 Alfred Douglas Pass, of Wootton Fitzpaine, Charmouth
- 1923 Sir Reginald John Pinney of Racedown, Crewkerne
- 1924 Major Kenneth Robert Balfour, of Steepleton Manor, Dorchester.
- 1925 Major Charles Robert Eustace Radclyffe, of Hyde, Wareham.
- 1926 Major Hugh Blomfield Nicholson of Mappercombe Manor, Melplash
- 1927 Capt. Sir Richard Fitzgerald Glyn Bt. of Gaunt's House, Wimborne
- 1928 Carlton Cross, of Wyke Hall, Gillingham
- 1929 Harry Rupert Fetherstonhaugh-Frampton, of Moreton New House, Dorchester
- 1930 Lieut.-Col. Edward George Troyte–Bullock of Zeals House, Zeals
- 1931 Capt. Berkeley Cole Wilmot Williams, of Herringston, Dorchester
- 1932 Wilfred John Brymer, of Ilsington House, Piddletown, Dorchester
- 1933 Lieut.-Col. Edward Philip Le Breton, of Loders Court, Bridport
- 1934 Capt. Angus Valdemar Hambro, of Merly House, Wimborne
- 1935 Major Harry Denison Denison-Pender of Strangways, Marnhull
- 1936 Lieut.-Commander Hector Richard Monro, of Edmondesham, Cranborne, Salisbury
- 1937 Lieut.-Col. John Bernhard Harbin Goodden of Compton Hawy, Sherborne
- 1938 Major Rhys Clavell Mansel, of Smedmore, Kimmeridge, Corfe Castle
- 1939 Henry John Ralph Bankes, of Kingston Lacy, Wimborne
- 1940 Capt. Lewys Legge Yeatman, of Stock House, near Sturminster Newton
- 1941 Sir Claud Schuster of The Manor House, Piddletrenthide, Dorchester
- 1942 Major William John Bates Van de Weyer of Clyffe, Dorchester
- 1943 Ernest Frederick Cambridge Lane of Poxwell House, near Dorchester
- 1944 John Henry Lionel Glasbrook of Manor House, Child Okeford, Blandford
- 1945 William Ralph Garneys Bond of Tyneham, Corfe Castle.
- 1946 Lieutenant-Colonel Sir William Philip Colfox, Bt. of Symondsbury Manor, Bridport.
- 1947 Lieut.-Co. George Ambrose Pinney of Horn Park, Beaminster.
- 1948 Colonel George Harold Absell Ing of Jerards, Sandford Orcas, Sherborne.
- 1949 Sir Philip Francis Cunningham Williams, Bt., of Bridehead, Little Bredy, Dorchester.
- 1950 Lieut.-Colonel John Fitzherbert Symes Bullen, of Catherston, Charmouth, Dorset.
- 1951 Lieut.-Colonel Joseph William Weld of Lulworth Castle, Dorset.
- 1952 Commander Henry Kelsall Beckford Mitchell of Folke Manor, Sherborne.
- 1953 Sir Arthur Nugent Floyer-Acland
- 1954 Lieut-Colonel Sir Thomas Henry Salt, Bt, of Shillingstone House, Shillingstone, Blandford.
- 1955 Admiral Sir Victor Alexander Charles Crutchley of Mappercombe Manor, Powerstock, Bridport
- 1956 William Wigan Llewellin of Upton House, near Poole.
- 1957 Lieut-Colonel Edward William Seymour of Tarrant Albbey, Blandford.
- 1958 Major Etienne Henry Tudor Boileau, of Rampisham Manor, Dorchester.
- 1959 Lieut.-Colonel Kenneth Greville Williams of Stock Hill, Gillingham.
- 1960 Sir Thomas Edward Lees, Bt., of Post Green, Lytchett Minster, Poole.
- 1961 Lieut.-Colonel Robert Stanley Grosvenor Perry of Moor Lane House, Briantspuddle, Dorchester.
- 1962 Lieut.-Commander George Gosselin Marten of Crichel, Wimborne.
- 1963 Colonel Richard James Longfield, of Lower Silton, Gillingham
- 1964 Lieut.-Commander Robert Hugh Hodgkinson of Milton Abbey School, near Blandford Forum.
- 1965 Commander Roger Henry Charles Fetherstonhaugh-Frampton of Moreton House, Dorchester.
- 1966 Major William Harry Gibson Fleming, of Ranston, Blandford.
- 1967 Henry Rolf Gardiner of Springhead, Fontmell Magna, Shaftesbury.
- 1968 John Mansell of Smedmore, Wareham
- 1969 Sir William John Colfox of Symondsbury Manor, Bridport
- 1970 Major-General Edward Alexander Wilmot Williams of Herringston, Dorchester.
- 1971 Major Nigel Darner Martin, of Came House, Dorchester.
- 1972 Lieut-Colonel John Lewys Yeatman, of Stock Gaylard House, near Sturminster Newton.
- 1973 Peter Frank Tiarks of Melplash Court, Bridport.

== List of High Sheriffs of Dorset ==
=== 1974–2000 ===
- 1974 Brigadier Stafford Floyer-Acland
- 1975 Lieut.-Colonel James Thomas Amcotts Wilson
- 1976 George Edward Sealy Woodhouse of West Lodge, Blandford
- 1977 Major-General Henry Mark Garneys Bond
- 1978 Major Graham Neville Yeatman
- 1979 Lady Elizabeth Mary Garneys Williams, of Bridehead, Littlebredy, Dorchester.
- 1980 George Anthony Lane-Fox Pitt-Rivers of Manor House, Hinton St Mary, Sturminster Newton
- 1981 Sir Stephen George Hammick, 5th Baronet, of Badgers, Wraxall, Dorchester.
- 1982 Deric Sydney Scott of the Crest, Bournemouth
- 1983 Richard Greville Earle of Frankham Farm, Ryme Intrinseca, Sherborne
- 1984 Mark Roper of Forde Abbey, Chard
- 1985 Christopher John Rolph Pope of Wrackleford House, Dorchester
- 1986 Colonel Kenneth Dubois Ferguson, of Studland Bay House, Studland, Swanage.
- 1987 Lt-Cmdr William Victor Percy Crutchley, R.N. of Mappercombe Manor, Nettlecombe, Bridport
- 1988 Henry Walter Plunkett-Ernle-Erle-Drax of Charborough Park, Wareham
- 1989 Mary Anna Marten of Crichel, Wimborne
- 1990 Peter Winder Allsebrook, of Milton Mill, West Milton, Bridport
- 1991 Edwin William Ludlow, of Friar Waddon Farm House, Friar Waddon, Weymouth
- 1992 Giles Patrick Sturdy of Trigon House, Wareham
- 1993 Richard Guy Grosvenor de Pelet
- 1994 Capt. Michael Fulford-Dobson, R.N. of Cerne Abbey, Cerne Abbas, Dorchester
- 1995 John Derek Wrighton of Preston, Weymouth
- 1996 Wilfrid Joseph Weld
- 1997 Richard Walter Fielding
- 1998 Cmdr Peter Gelson Gregson RN
- 1999 Anthony Graham Yeatman
- 2000 Michael John Ashley Bond

=== 2001–present ===
- 2001 Charles Arnold Grosvenor Perry
- 2002 James Richard Boughey
- 2003 Eleanor Weld
- 2004 Allan Frank Simmons
- 2005 Charlotte Anne Townshend
- 2006 David Harold Woodhouse
- 2007 Adrian Eason Bailey Scott
- 2008 John Roland Raymond
- 2009: Victoria Mary McDonaugh of Wimborne
- 2010: Timothy John Palmer of West Woodyates
- 2011: Alan John Frost of Bournemouth
- 2012: Jeremy James Richard Pope, of Dorchester
- 2013: Catriona Janet Payne of Dorchester
- 2014: Jane Stichbury of Ashley Park, Ringwood
- 2015: Jennifer Sheila Coombs of Stepleton House, Iwerne Stepleton, Blandford Forum
- 2016: Sir Philip Williams, 4th Baronet of Bridehead, Littlebredy, Dorchester
- 2017: Simon John Young of Blandford
- 2018: Jacqueline Anne Swift of Poole
- 2019: Philip Henry Warr of Canford Magna, Wimborne
- 2020: George Henry Streatfeild of Bridport
- 2021: Michael Matthew Patrick Dooley of Dorchester
- 2022: Sibyl Fine King
- 2023: Colin William George Weston
- 2024: Anthony William Woodhouse, Dorchester
- 2025: Callum Bremner, Bridport
- 2026: Helena Margaret Conibear, Dorchester

== Bibliography ==
- Hughes, A. (1898). List of Sheriffs for England and Wales from the Earliest Times to A.D. 1831. London: Eyre & Spottiswoode. (with amendments of 1963, Public Record Office)
