= Robert Napier (judge) =

English-born judge

Sir Robert Napier (c.1542-1615), was an English-born judge who served in Ireland. He was later to become a long-serving member of Parliament.

== Biography ==
Napier was born at Swyre in Dorset, a younger son of James Napier of Puncknowle, a member of an old Scottish family, the Napiers of Merchiston Castle, Edinburgh, a branch of which had settled in Dorset. His mother was Anne Hillary or Hilliard, widow of Thomas Elyatt. His precise date of birth is uncertain: in his last will and testament dated 1614, he describes himself as being "about 72", suggesting 1542 as the most likely date. Robert always spelt his name Napper, as opposed to the more fashionable Napier. He was educated at Exeter College, Oxford, Fellow 1559, Bachelor of Arts 1562. He entered the Middle Temple in 1566, and was fined for failing to act as reader in 1588.

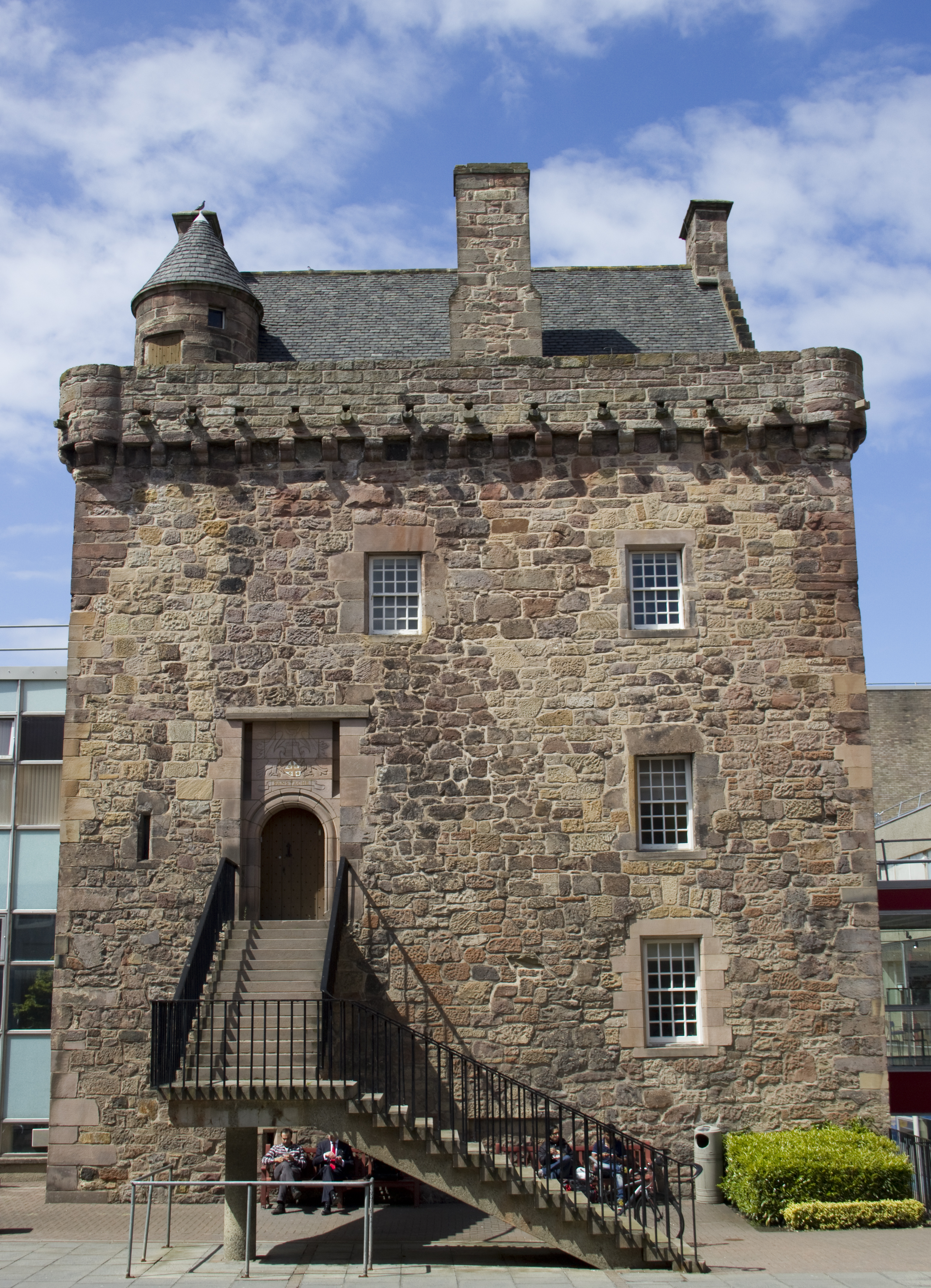
Merchiston Castle, Edinburgh, the original home of the Napier family

== Judge ==
In 1593, he was knighted and sent to Ireland as Chief Baron of the Irish Exchequer, against his own wish, as he considered it impossible for an honest man to live on the salary. Both senior and junior branches of the Napier family were inclined to the Roman Catholic faith, as were the families of both Robert's wives, the Warhams and the Dentons, but Robert was clearly never suspected of recusancy; his last will made provision for his burial, but contained no overt statement of his religious beliefs.

As a judge, Napier was universally agreed to be a failure, although the Crown initially commended him for his "good services". While some (though by no means all) other English judges found the damp Irish climate a burden which seriously affected their health, most of them made the effort to perform their duties conscientiously enough. Napier on the other hand sent back to England a stream of complaints about his poor health and inadequate salary.

He took a keen interest in espionage. He lobbied for a Chief Justiceship in England, and for further grants of land, and crossed regularly to England, on one occasion being nearly shipwrecked off Holyhead. In 1600, he went back to England for good and refused to return to Dublin; he was suspended from office in 1601 and replaced the following year by the elderly but respected barrister Edmund Pelham.

== Member of Parliament ==
Napier was Sheriff of Dorset in 1606 and Chief Baron of the Exchequer in Ireland. He was a member of parliament for Dorchester (1586–7), Bridport (1601), and Wareham (1604–6). Despite his poor reputation as a judge, which was apparently due to indolence rather than any lack of legal learning, he was a surprisingly effective and active MP: his legal expertise was much in demand, and he sat on several committees in the early sessions of the 1604-11 Parliament.

== Landowner ==
Napier, though he grumbled that an Irish judge could never be rich if he stayed on "an honest and upright course", nonetheless founded the fortunes of the Napier family in Dorset. Assisted by a number of grants from the Crown, he acquired extensive estates in the county, including Middlemarsh Grange, Minterne Magna, which became the family seat. The Napiers also acquired an estate at Loughcrew, near Oldcastle, County Meath, which remained in the family for several generations, and Crichel House, Moor Crichel, East Dorset, which later became the main family home. The senior male line died out in 1765, and the estates passed to the Sturt family, who were descendants of the female line.

He is buried at Minterne Magna Church. In his will he left money for the accommodation of ten poor men in Dorchester: his son Nathaniel used it to build the Napier Almshouses in that town.

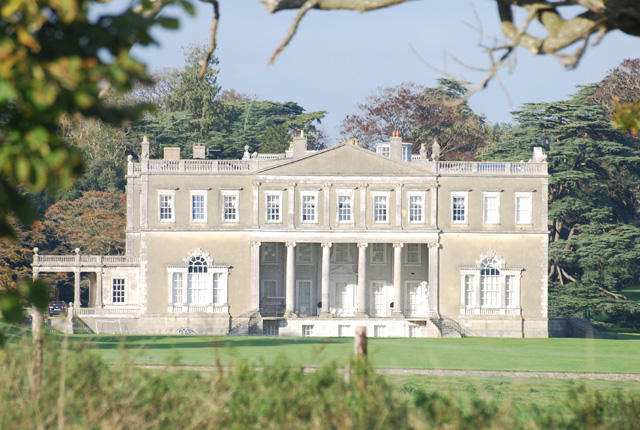
Crichel House, Moor Crichel, home to later generations of the Napier family

== Family ==
Napier married firstly Catherine, daughter of John Warham of Compton Valence and Catherine Soper, by whom he had a daughter, Anne (died before 1617), who married Sir John Ryves of Damory Court, Dorset (eldest brother of Sir William Ryves, later acting Lord Chancellor of Ireland and George Ryves, Warden of New College, Oxford). He married secondly Magdalen (died 1635), daughter of Sir Anthony Denton of Tonbridge, Kent. Magdalen was the mother of Napier's only son and heir Nathaniel.

By this marriage, the Napiers became a close connection of the noted antiquary Sir Simonds d'Ewes, whose stepmother was Sir Anthony's second wife Elizabeth Isham. The marriage of Nathaniel Napier to Elizabeth Gerrard, daughter of John Gerrard of Steeple, in about 1599 caused a good deal of adverse comment, since even for the time the couple, at eleven and nine, were considered to be exceptionally young for marriage.

Napier's son, Sir Nathaniel, was also a member of parliament, as was his grandson, Sir Gerrard, who was created a baronet in 1641. His great-grandson, Sir Robert Napier, 1st Baronet, of Punknoll, was also a baronet of a separate creation.
