= John Digby, 1st Earl of Bristol =

English diplomat (1580–1653)

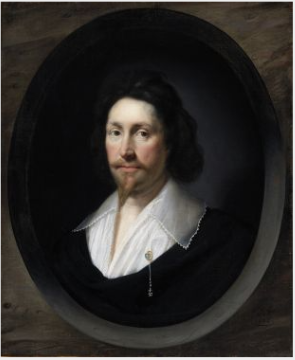

John Digby, 1st Earl of Bristol (February 1580 – 21 January 1653), was an English diplomat and a moderate royalist during the English Civil War.

== Early career ==
He was the son of Sir George Digby of Coleshill, Warwickshire, and Abigail, daughter of Sir Anthony (not Arthur) Heveningham and educated at Magdalene College, Cambridge and the Inner Temple. He was knighted in 1606. He was briefly the Member of Parliament for Hedon in 1610.

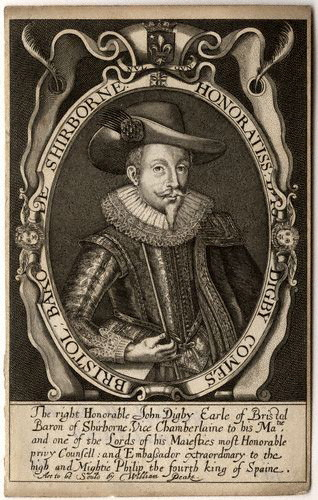
The Earl of Bristol.

On his arrival at Court, his charm, good looks and diplomatic ability quickly gained him the favour of King James I, who sent him to Madrid as his ambassador to Spain during the early 1610s. Digby uncovered details of Spanish pensions paid to the late Earl of Salisbury, the naval officer William Monson, Lady Jane Drummond, and the Countess of Suffolk. Digby was rewarded for his service as a diplomat by being created Baron Digby of Sherborne in 1618 and Earl of Bristol in 1622.

Digby was a leading figure in the unsuccessful Spanish Match, the effort to marry Prince Charles to the Infanta Maria Anna of Spain. Digby was made the scapegoat for the failure of the marriage plan, recalled and ordered to reside on his estates. Charles after his accession offered Digby a return to royal favour if he would admit his blame for the failure of the match; Digby, who was a stubborn and hot-tempered man, and could be terrifying in his anger, refused. Charles, infuriated, impeached him and sent him to the Tower of London; Digby, undaunted, made counter-charges against George Villiers, 1st Duke of Buckingham, the prime royal favourite. Ominously for the King's reputation, the House of Lords decided to hear Digby in his own defence first. His trial never proceeded, although he remained in the Tower until 1628, and the affair seriously damaged the King's reputation as a man of honour.

The murder of the Duke of Buckingham in August 1628 caused Digby to reconsider his opposition to the King; like Strafford and others among the Lords he was alarmed at Parliament's increasing radicalism. He offered his services to Charles and was formally reconciled with him. Charles, however, was slow to trust those who had ever opposed him and Digby had little influence at Court in the 1630s.

== Civil War ==
As the political crisis of the early 1640s mounted, Digby emerged as a trusted and moderate royal adviser, along with his son George, Lord Digby. At the Council of Peers held at York in September 1640, the King showed an unprecedented willingness to listen to Bristol's criticism of his policy, and agreed to his advice that a Parliament must be summoned. 1641 saw a complete reconciliation between the two men: Bristol with Lord Bedford became leader of the moderate Royalists in the House of Lords, working to achieve a compromise with John Pym, and save the Earl of Strafford's life. After the collapse of the attempt at compromise Bristol came increasingly to be seen as a "hardline" royalist: as such Parliament imprisoned him after the outbreak of the Civil War, although he was later allowed to join the King at Oxford. After the Battle of Edgehill he was one of the "moderate party" who persuaded the King not to attempt to take London, which might have brought the war to a swift conclusion. After the King's defeat, he moved to Paris and died there in 1653 aged 72.

== Character ==
Clarendon, who knew and liked Bristol, gave this sketch of him:

"Of a grave aspect, of a presence which drew respect, and a very handsome man who by the extraordinary favour of King James to his person was Ambassador to Spain before he was 30. Though he was a man of great parts and a wise man in Council he was passionate and supercilious and was too voluminous in discourse so that he was not considered there with much respect." John Philipps Kenyon praised him as "the greatest servant of the English Crown of his generation", but humorously called him "the terrible earl", on account of his hot temper and intimidating personality.

== Marriage and progeny ==
Lord Bristol lived at Sherborne Castle, Dorset. He married Beatrice Walcott (died 1658), widow of Sir John Dyve of Bromham, Bedfordshire, in 1609 and they had four surviving children:

- George Digby, 2nd Earl of Bristol (1612-1677)
- Mary Digby (1612–1648), who married as his 2nd wife Arthur Chichester, 1st Earl of Donegall (1606–1674). They had six sons and one daughter, all of whom died in infancy. She died on 5 November 1648 while giving birth to a second daughter stillborn. She was buried in Eggesford Church, Devon, where is situated her memorial effigy.
- John Digby (1618–1664)
- Abigail Digby (d 1640), married George Freke of Sherbourne, Dorset (son of John Freke) and bore one son, John.

Through her previous marriage, Lady Bristol was the mother of the prominent Royalist Sir Lewis Dyve.

Digby was the uncle of Sir Kenelm Digby, English courtier, diplomat and a highly reputed natural philosopher.

Diplomatic posts
Preceded by John Man	English Ambassador to Spain; 1610–1624	Succeeded by The Earl of Arlington
Political offices
Preceded by The Lord Cottington; Sir Denzil Holles	Custos Rotulorum of Dorset; 1642–1646; With: The Lord Cottington; Sir Denzil Holles	Interregnum
Peerage of England
New creation	Earl of Bristol; 1622–1653	Succeeded by George Digby
New creation	Baron Digby (descended by acceleration); 1618–1641	Succeeded by George Digby
