= Gilbert Jones =

English lawyer and politician

Gilbert Jones was an English lawyer and politician who sat in the House of Commons in 1640.

Jones was probably the son of Gilbert Jones of Poole, Montgomery and was a student of Gray's Inn in 1617. He attended All Souls' College, Oxford and was awarded BCL on 10 March 1623 and DCL on 14 January 1628. He lived at Dorchester.

In April 1640, Jones was elected Member of Parliament for Wareham in the Short Parliament. Jones was chancellor of the diocese of Bristol by 1661.

Parliament of England
Vacant Parliament suspended since 1629	Member of Parliament for Wareham; 1640; With: John Trenchard	Succeeded by John Trenchard; Thomas Erle
