= Edmund Prideaux (MP for Taunton) =

Edmund Prideaux (1634–1702) was a member of Parliament for the constituency of Taunton. He took part in Monmouth's rebellion, and bribed Judge Jeffreys heavily to save his life.

== Biography ==
Edmund Prideaux was the only surviving son and heir of Edmund Prideaux and his second wife Margaret (died 25 April 1683), daughter and coheir of William Iveey, of Cottey, Somerset. John Tillotson, afterwards archbishop, was tutor. He matriculated at Exeter College, Oxford on 12 November 1650, and said to be aged 18.

On his father's death on 19 August 1659, he inherited the baronetcy which the Lord Protector Oliver Cromwell had granted to his father on 31 May 1658. This dignity was held for a short time as it was sent into oblivion at the Restoration in May 1660 and not renewed. (Note: According to George Cokayne it is the only Protectorate baronetcy which was inherited, all the other passed into oblivion before an inheritance took place .)

Prideaux was M.P. for Taunton from December 1680 to 1681. He took part in the Duke of Monmouth's Rebellion and is said to have escaped the consequences thereof by a heavy bribe to the Lord Chief Justice Jeffreys. He died on 16 October 1702, and was buried in the Chapel at Ford Abbey.

== Family ==
Prideaux married, Amy, daughter and coheir of John Fraunceis, of Combe Flory on 19 March 1656, at Combe Flory, Somerset. She died January 1703 and was also buried in the Chapel at Ford Abbey.

Their only son Francis Prideaux, matriculated at Wadham College, Oxford on 11 May 1676, aged 17. He was admitted to the Inner Temple, 1677 and died unmarried before his father.
