= Edmund Prideaux (Roundhead) =

English lawyer and Member of Parliament

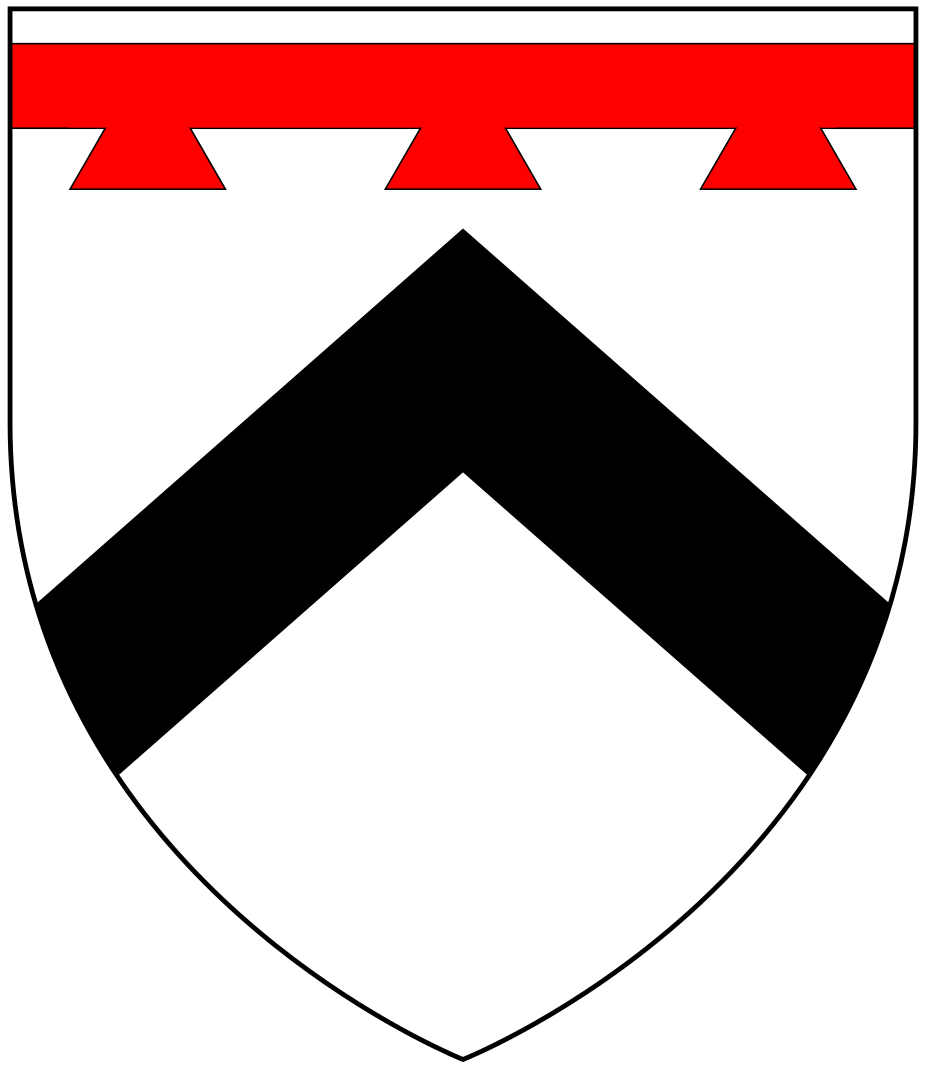
Arms of Prideaux

Edmund Prideaux (died 1659) of Forde Abbey, Thorncombe, Devon, was an English lawyer and Member of Parliament, who supported the Parliamentary cause during the Civil War. He was briefly solicitor-general but chose to resign rather than participate in the regicide of King Charles I. Afterwards, he was attorney-general, a position he held until he died. During the Civil War and for most of the First Commonwealth he ran the postal service for Parliament.

== Origins ==
Prideaux was born at Netherton House in the parish of Farway, near Honiton, Devon, and was the second son of Sir Edmund Prideaux, 1st Baronet (d.1629), of Netherton, an eminent lawyer of the Inner Temple and member of an ancient family which originated at Prideaux Castle in Cornwall, by his second wife, Catherine Edgcumbe, daughter of Piers Edgcumbe of Mount Edgcumbe in Devon (now in Cornwall).

== Education ==
Prideaux was first educated at Truro Grammar School, graduated M.A. at Cambridge, and on 6 July 1625 was admitted ad eundem at Oxford. On 23 November 1623 he was called to the bar at the Inner Temple and subsequently practiced law chiefly in chancery. He was appointed to the honourable posts of Recorder of Exeter, and later in 1649 Recorder of Bristol.

== Long Parliament ==
Prideaux was elected to the Long Parliament for Lyme Regis in Dorset (which seat he held till his death), and forthwith took the side of the Parliamentarians against King Charles I. In 1642 his subscription for the defence of parliament was £100. By his own side he was regarded as one of the persons best informed as to the state of feeling in the West of England.

For three years, from 10 November 1643 until it was transferred to the custody of the speakers of the two houses, Prideaux was one of the commissioners in charge of the Great Seal of Parliament, an office worth £1,500 per annum, and as a mark of respect, by order of the House of Commons, he was called within the bar with precedence next after the solicitor-general. Prideaux was one of the Parliamentary commissioners appointed to negotiate with the king's commissioners at the Treaty of Uxbridge in January 1645. Edward Hyde in his History of the Rebellion would accuse Prideaux, along with Henry Vane and Oliver Saint-John, of being spies for a party within Parliament that had no intention of allowing any sort of compromise in the furtherance of a treaty.

== Resignation before the regicide ==
On 12 October 1648 he was appointed by parliament as Solicitor General for England and Wales. He resigned the office when the king's trial became imminent and John Cook was solicitor-general on that occasion and subsequently. Prideaux did not however lose favour with his party. On 9 April 1649 he was appointed attorney-general, and remained in that office for the rest of his life.

== Postal service ==
For many years Prideaux was intimately and profitably connected with the postal service. The question of the validity of patents for the conduct of posts was raised in both houses of Parliament in connection with the 1640 sequestration of the office of Thomas Witherings, granted in 1633. Prideaux served as chairman of the committee appointed in 1642 to enquire into the rates of inland letters. In 1644 he was appointed, by resolution of both houses, "Master of the Posts, Messengers, and Couriers"; and he continued at intervals, as directed by the House of Commons or otherwise, to manage the postal service. In 1644 he was ordered to arrange a post to Hull, York, and Lyme Regis, and in 1649 to Chester, Holyhead, and Ireland, and also to Bideford in Devon; likewise in 1650 to Kendal, and in 1651 to Carlisle. By 1649 he is said to have established a regular weekly service throughout the kingdom.

Rumour assigned to Prideaux's post office an annual income of £15,000. Blackstone states that his reforms saved the country £5,000 per annum and certainly it was so profitable as to excite rivalry. Prideaux soon met with competition and Oxenbridge, Thomson, and others, encouraged by the House of Lords judgement on 9 July 1646 in the case of Earl of Warwick v. Witherings, which declared as void the clause in Witherings's patent for restraint of carrying letters, endeavoured to carry on a cheap and speedy post of their own. Prideaux met them by a variety of devices, some in the way of ordinary competition, but others in the shape of abuses of power and breaches of the law. In 1650 the Common Council of London endeavoured itself to organise the carriage of letters, whereupon Prideaux brought the matter before Parliament, which on 21 March 1650 referred the question to the Council of State, which on the same day ordered that Attorney-General Prideaux should take care of the business of the inland post, and be accountable for the profits quarterly, and ordered the appointment of a committee to confer with him as to the management of the post.

After various claims had been considered, on 21 March 1652 Parliament resolved that the office of postmaster ought to be at the sole disposal of the House of Commons, and the Irish and the Scotch committee, to which the question was referred, reported in favour of letting contracts for the carriage of letters. Prideaux contended that the office of postmaster and the carrying of letters were two distinct things, and that the 1652 resolution of Parliament referred to the former only; but eventually all previous grants were held to be set aside by that resolution, and in 1653 contracts were let for the inland and foreign mails to John Manley.

== Private practice and death ==
The loss of the office of postmaster and the carrying of letters affected Prideaux little. His legal practice continued to be large and lucrative, being worth £5,000 a year. He purchased Forde Abbey in the parish of Thorncombe, then in Devonshire, now in Dorset, where he built a large mansion house. On 31 May 1658 he was made a baronet by the Lord Protector Oliver Cromwell, for "his voluntary offer for the mainteyning of thirty foot-souldiers in his highnes army in Ireland".

== Marriages and children ==
Prideaux married twice:

- Firstly, on 23 August 1627, to Jane Collins (1610–1629), daughter and heiress of Henry Collins of Salston in the parish of Ottery St Mary, Devon, by his wife Joan Pabant, daughter and heiress of Humphrey Pabant. She died and was buried on 16 November 1629 at Ottery.
- Secondly, shortly afterwards, he married Margaret Ivery (died 25 April 1683), a daughter and co-heiress of William Ivery of Cottey, Somerset, by whom he had one son and one daughter:
  - Edmund Prideaux, MP for Taunton. His childhood tutor was John Tillotson, later Archbishop of Canterbury. He took part in Monmouth's rebellion and bribed Judge Jeffreys heavily to save his life.
  - Margaret Prideaux (c.1627/37 - 1695) who on the 8th August 1657 married Thomas Chamberlayne 2nd Baronet Wickham at St Dionis Backchurch London.

== Death and succession ==
Prideaux died on 19 August 1659, at the age of 57, leaving a great fortune, and was buried in the Chapel at Forde Abbey. His estate and baronetcy were inherited by his only surviving son and heir Edmund Prideaux, MP for Taunton, but in 1660 the baronetcy passed into oblivion at the Restoration and unlike some others was not renewed.

== Assessment ==
According to Hamilton (1893) Prideaux "appears to have been a sound chancery lawyer and highly esteemed by his party as a man of religion as well as learning".

== Coat of Arms ==
The arms of Prideaux are blazoned Argent, a chevron sable in chief a label of three points gules.

== Notes ==
Parliament of England
Vacant Parliament suspended since 1629	Member of Parliament for Lyme Regis; 1640–1653; With: Sir Walter Erle 1640; Richard Rose 1640–1648	Not represented in the Barebones Parliament
Vacant Not represented in the Barebones Parliament	Member of Parliament for Lyme Regis; 1654–1659; With: Henry Henley 1659	Succeeded by Sir Walter Yonge, 2nd Baronet; Thomas Moore
Political offices
Preceded by Geoffrey Palmer	Solicitor General for England and Wales; 1648–1649	Succeeded by John Cooke
Preceded by William Steele	Attorney General for England and Wales; 1649–1659	Succeeded by Robert Reynolds
