= Richard King (MP) =

English lawyer and politician

Richard King was an English lawyer and politician who sat in the House of Commons between 1640 and 1643. He supported the Royalist side in the English Civil War.

King was elected recorder of Melcombe Regis on 4 February 1628.

In April 1640, King was elected Member of Parliament for Melcombe Regis in the Short Parliament. He was re-elected MP for Melcombe Regis in the Long Parliament in November 1640 King is recorded in an incident in 1641 after George Digby was accelerated to the House of Lords. Digby's younger brother John perched himself on a ladder at the door of the chamber which the speaker, William Lenthall took as an act of disrespect and insubordination and told him to take his place, and not to sit upon the ladder as if he were going to be hanged. King complained that the Speaker had transgressed his duty in using so disgraceful a speech to so noble a gentleman and after some turmoil obtained a conditional apology. King supported King Charles and was disabled from sitting in parliament on 27 February 1643.

King died between 1643 and 1645.

Parliament of England
Vacant Parliament suspended since 1629	Member of Parliament for Melcombe Regis; 1640–1643; With: Thomas Gyard 1640; Sir Walter Erle 1640–1643	Succeeded by Sir Walter Erle; Matthew Allen
