= Roger Hill (judge) =

English judge and Member of Parliament

Roger Hill (1 December 1605 – 21 April 1667), of Poundisford Park in Somerset, was an English judge and Member of Parliament.

Hill was born at Colyton in Devon, the eldest son of William Hill of Poundisford Park, member of a family of Somerset squires who could trace their ancestry back to a Sir John Hill in the reign of Edward III. He was admitted to the Inner Temple on 22 March 1624, and was called to the bar on 10 February 1632, becoming a bencher of the Inn in 1649. In March 1644, he was the junior of the five counsel employed against Archbishop Laud, and from 1646 headed a set of Chambers in the Temple. Though named in the commission for the trial of the King he never sat on it, but he subsequently served as assistant to the attorney-general during the Commonwealth. He also represented Taunton in the Short Parliament and Bridport in the Long Parliament, remaining an active member of the Rump, and served as Recorder of Bridport.

Hill was appointed a serjeant-at-law in 1655, judge of assize in 1656, a baron of the Exchequer in 1657. In that capacity, he assisted at the ceremony of investiture of the Lord Protector in June 1657; and as one of the judges attendant on Cromwell's House of Peers, he delivered a message from them to the Commons in the following January. In the summer of 1658 he went on the Oxford circuit with Chief Justice Glynne, an account of the proceedings of which, "writ in drolling verse", was published soon afterwards. On 17 January 1660, he was transferred from the Exchequer to the Upper Bench.

At the Restoration Hill escaped any serious sanction, but was not confirmed in his rank of serjeant, apparently in disapproval of his membership of the Rump, since most of the other serjeants made during the Commonwealth were allowed to keep their rank.

Hill married three times. His first marriage, in 1635, was to Katherine Green (d. 1638), daughter of Giles Green of Allington, by whom he had a son and a daughter. Then, in 1641, he married Abigail Gurdon (died 1658), daughter of Brampton Gurdon of Assington Hall in Suffolk, by whom he had one son, Sir Roger Hill, who was knighted by Charles II in 1668. His third marriage, in 1662, to Abigail Barnes, daughter and co-heir of Thomas Barnes, brought him an estate at Aldborough Hatch in Essex, where he died on 21 April 1667. He was buried in the Temple Church.
