= Nathaniel Napier (died 1635) =

English Member of Parliament

Sir Nathaniel Napier (c. 1587 – 6 September 1635), of Middlemarsh Hall and Moor Crichel in Dorset, was an English Member of Parliament (MP).

He was born c. 1587, the only son of Sir Robert Napier, a judge and MP who held the office of Lord Chief Baron of the Irish Exchequer, and his second wife Magdalen Denton, daughter of Sir Anthony Denton of Tonbridge. He was knighted in 1617.

He served a year as High Sheriff of Dorset in 1620 and represented Dorset (1625), Wareham (1625–26) and Milborne Port (1628–29) in the House of Commons.

Sir Nathaniel also built the family mansion of Crichel House at Moor Crichel. He is remembered in Dorchester for building the Napier Almshouses from money left by his father for that purpose: this was one of many charitable projects inspired by the Great Fire of 1613.

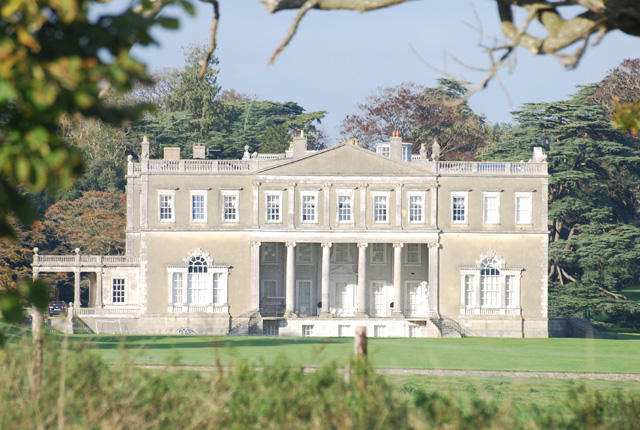
Crichel House, Moor Crichel, the Napiers' family home

He married c. 1599 Elizabeth Gerrard (died 1624), daughter of John Gerrard of Purbeck and Anne Daccombe: according to one historian he was not quite twelve at the time of the marriage and the bride two years younger. Elizabeth brought him a substantial property at Longhide, Steeple. They had six sons and two daughters. The eldest son, Gerrard, was also an MP from 1628 and was created first of the Napier Baronets of Middle Marsh in 1641. A younger son Robert was the father of Sir Robert Napier, 1st Baronet, of Punknoll (a separate creation from his uncle). A third son James founded the Irish branch of the family who were settled at Loughcrew.
