= William Sydenham =

Cromwellian soldier in England (1615–1661)

William Sydenham (1615 – July 1661) was a Cromwellian soldier in England. The eldest brother of Thomas Sydenham, he fought for Parliament and defeated the Royalists in various skirmishes in Dorset. He was member of the various parliaments of the Commonwealth, avowal conservative principles, and defended the liberties of Englishmen. In 1654 made councillor and commissioner of the treasury by Oliver Cromwell. Took the side of the army against Parliament. In 1660, after the Protectorate, and before the Restoration, he was expelled from the Long Parliament. After the Restoration, he was perpetually incapacitated from holding office by the Indemnity and Oblivion Act.

== Biography ==
Sydenham was a Cromwellian soldier, baptised 8 April 1615, was the eldest son of William Sydenham of Wynford Eagle, Dorset, by Mary, daughter of Sir John Jeffrey of Catherston. Thomas Sydenham was his brother. When the English Civil War broke out Sydenham and his three younger brothers took up arms for Parliament, and distinguished themselves by their activity in the local struggle. In April 1644 he had risen to the rank of colonel, and on 17 June 1644 Earl of Essex appointed him governor of Weymouth. In July Sydenham defeated a plundering party from the garrison of Wareham at Dorchester, and hanged six or eight of his prisoners as being "mere Irish rebels". This gave rise to equally cruel reprisals on the part of the royalists.

In conjunction with Sir Anthony Ashley Cooper, Sydenham captured Wareham on 10 August 1644, and Abbotsbury House. He also defeated Sir Lewis Dyve, the commander-in-chief of the Dorset Royalists, in various skirmishes, in one of which he killed, with his own hand, Major Williams, whom he accused of the murder of his mother. In February 1645 Sir Lewis Dyve surprised Weymouth, but Sydenham and the garrison of Melcombe Regis succeeded in regaining it a fortnight later.

In November 1645 Sydenham was elected to Parliament as member for Melcombe. On 1 March 1648 the House of Lords ordered Sydenham £1,000 towards his arrears of pay to be raised by discoveries of "delinquents' lands" (confiscate Royalist lands). On 14 August 1649 he and Colonel Fleetwood were appointed joint governors of the Isle of Wight.

The historian Charles Firth states Sydenham's political importance really begins with the expulsion of the Long Parliament in 1653. He was a member of the council of thirteen appointed by the officers of the army on 29 April 1653; was summoned to the Rump Parliament, and was re-elected by that assembly to the Council of State on 9 July and 1 November 1653. His views, however, were too conservative for him to sympathise with the policy of the Rump Parliament. On 6 February 1649 he had been one of the tellers for the minority in the Long Parliament who wished to retain the House of Lords, so on 10 December 1653 he performed the same duty for the minority of the Rump Parliament who voted for the retention of an established church. Two days later Sydenham took the lead in proposing that the assembly should dissolve itself, and may therefore be considered one of the founders of the protectorate. Oliver Cromwell appointed Sydenham a member of his council, and made him also one of the commissioners of the treasury on 2 August 1654. His salary as councillor was £1,000 a year, and he enjoyed a similar sum as commissioner.

Sydenham sat for Dorset in the parliaments of 1654 and 1656, distinguishing himself during the debates of the latter by his opposition to the exorbitant punishment the house wished to inflict on James Naylor. When the Protector's intervention on behalf of Naylor raised a complaint of breach of privilege, Sydenham recalled the house to the real question. "We live as parliament men but for a time, but we live as Englishmen always. I would not have us be so tender of the privilege of parliament as to forget the liberties of Englishmen". He also spoke against anti-quaker legislation, and during the discussion of the petition and advice against the imposition of oaths and engagements. When in December 1657 Sydenham was summoned to Cromwell's House of Lords, a republican pamphlet remarked that, though "he hath not been thorough-paced for tyranny in time of parliaments", it was hoped he might yet be "so redeemed as never to halt or stand off for the future against the Protector's interest".

After the death of Oliver Cromwell Sydenham became one of Richard Cromwell's council; but in April 1659 he acted with Fleetwood, Desborough, and what was termed the Wallingford House party to force him to dissolve the third Protectorate Parliament. According to Ludlow, he was one of the chief agents in the negotiation between the army leaders and the republicans which led to Richard's fall. On the restoration of the Rump Parliament Sydenham became a member of the Committee of Safety on 7 May 1659 and of the Council of State just over a week later on 16 May, though he had conscientious scruples against taking the oath required from members of the latter. He was also given the command of a regiment of foot.

When John Lambert turned out the Rump Parliament again, Sydenham took part with the army, and was made a member of their Committee of Safety. Sydenham attempted to justify the violence of the army to the Council of State, "undertaking to prove that they were necessitated to make use of this last remedy by a particular call of divine Providence". When the Rump Parliament was again restored, Sydenham was called to answer for his conduct, and, failing to give a satisfactory explanation, was expelled on 17 January 1660. His regiment also was taken from him and given to John Lenthall, the speaker's son. At the restoration the Act of Indemnity and Oblivion included him among the eighteen persons perpetually incapacitated from holding any office on 29 August 1660, and he was also obliged to enter into a bond not to disturb the peace of the kingdom. Sydenham died in July 1661.

== Family ==
In 1637 Sydenham was married to Grace (who died about a week after Sydenham in 1661), daughter of John Trenchard of Warmwell.
