= John Strode =

John Strode may refer to:

- John Strode (died 1581) (1524–1581), MP for Dorset 1572
- John Strode (c.1561-1642), MP for Bridport 1621 & 1625
- John Strode (died 1679) (1624–1679), MP for Dorset 1661
- John Strode (died 1686) (1627–1686), Captain, Earl of Bristol's Foot ?1656–1658; MP for Sandwich, Lieutenant-Governor of Dover Castle
