= John Strode (c. 1561 – 1642) =

English MP

Sir John Strode
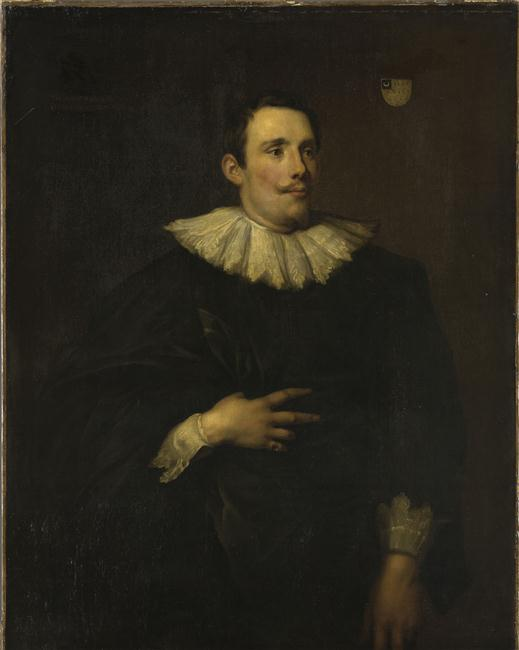
- Portrait of Sir John Strode; 17th century, after Anthony van Dyck
- Born: c. 1561; Parnham, Dorset
- Died: before 15 July 1642 (aged 81); Middle Temple, London
- Occupations: Lawyer; Politician
- Years active: 1590–1642
- Spouses: Anne Chaldecote (m. 1590; died 1621) Anne Wyndham (m. 1622)
- Children: Sir John Strode; George Strode; Hugh Strode; Thomas Strode
- Parents: John Strode; Katherine Cromwell

Arms of Strode of Parnham in Dorset: Ermine, on a canton sable a crescent argent.

Sir John Strode (c. 1561 – before 15 July 1642), of the Middle Temple, London and Chantmarle, Cattistock, Dorset, was an English MP for Bridport in 1621 and 1625.

== Early life ==
Born about 1561, Strode was the third son of John Strode of Parnham, Dorset and his first wife, Katherine, daughter of Gregory Cromwell, 1st Baron Cromwell and Elizabeth Seymour.

Strode was educated at New Inn, then Middle Temple, 1583. He was called to the bar in 1590.

== Career ==
Strode, a lawyer by profession, who gained a reputation as "an honest, trusty, learned, religious gentleman", served as a Justice of the Peace for Dorset by 1593–1642, commissioner sewers 1617, martial law 1626, knighthood compositions 1631, piracy 1631.

He was Autumn reader, Middle Temple in 1611, bencher from 1611 to 1642, treasurer from 1619 to 1620; recorder, Bridport, Dorset from 1618 to 1640. He was knighted at Theobalds 1 December 1623.

He died, aged 81, at the Middle Temple before 15 July in 1642. His widow was murdered defending Parnham House, near Beaminster in Dorset, in 1645 by a soldier under the command of Sir Thomas Fairfax during the Civil War.

== Marriages and issue ==
Strode married twice. He married firstly, Anne (d. 8 Aug. 1621), daughter of William Chaldecote of Quarleston, Dorset, and widow of Robert Bingham (d. 1587) of Bingham's Melcombe, Dorset, by whom he had no children.

Four months after his first wife's death, and two days after Margery Wyndham married Hugh Trevilian on 7 January 1622 at St Decumans (Watchet), Somerset, Strode married secondly on 9 January 1622 at St Decumans (Watchet), Somerset to Anne (d. 1645), daughter of Sir John Wyndham of Orchard Wyndham, Somerset, by whom he had four sons and two daughters, including:

- Sir John Strode (1624–1679)
- Sir George Strode, baptised at Cattistock on 28 November 1626. He died at the age of 75, on 24 October 1701, and was buried at Trinity Chapel, Lewston.
- Hugh Strode
- Thomas Strode

== Notes ==
Parliament of England
Preceded by William Bampfield; John Jeffrey	Member of Parliament for Bridport; 1621–1622; With: John Browne	Succeeded by William Muschamp; Robert Browne
Preceded by William Muschamp; Robert Browne	Member of Parliament for Bridport; 1625; With: Lewis Dyve	Succeeded by Lewis Dyve; Richard Strode
