= Henry Warburton =

English politician and amateur scientist

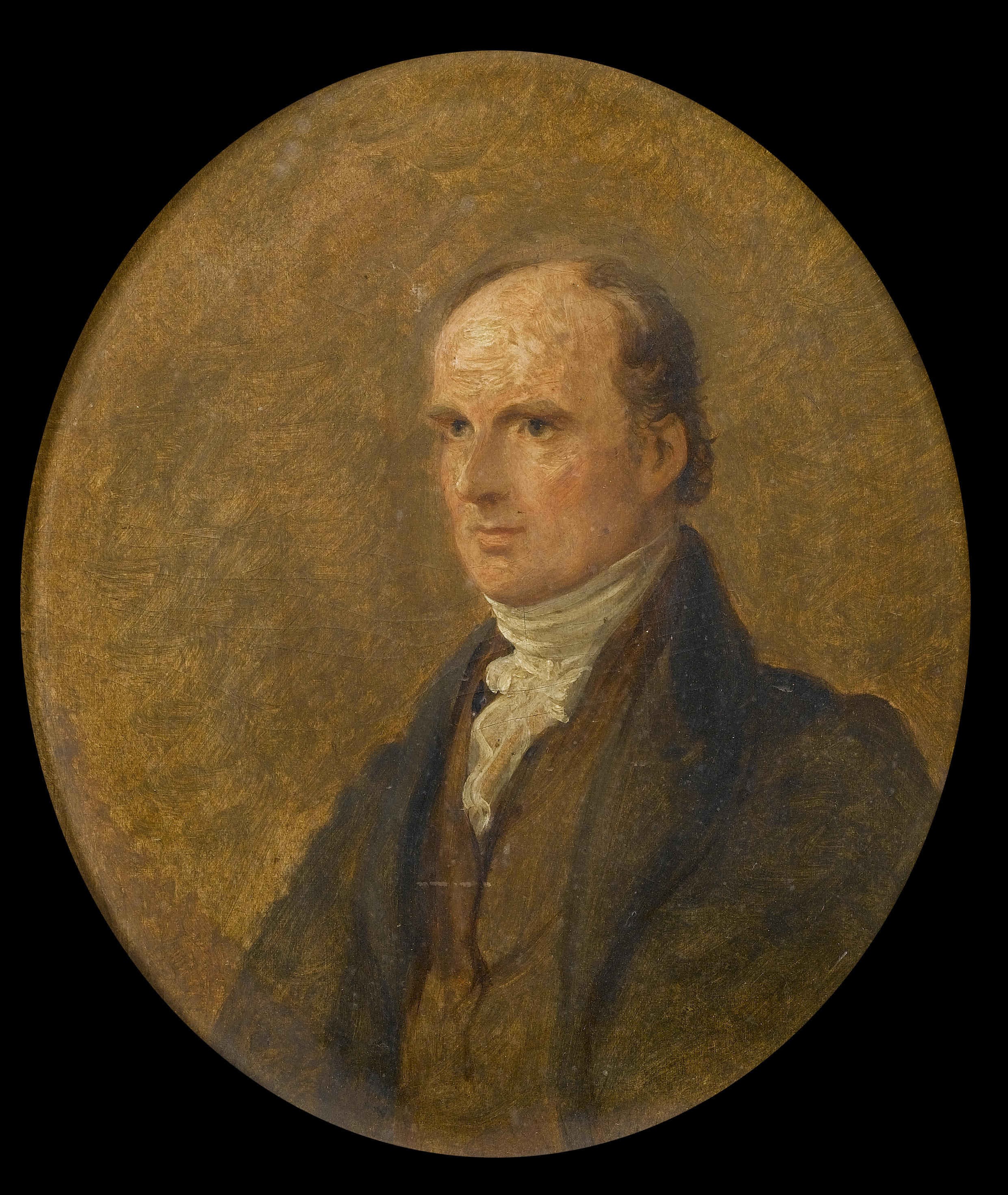
As painted by George Hayter in 1833.

Henry Warburton (12 November 1784 – 16 September 1858) was an English merchant and politician, and also an enthusiastic amateur scientist.

Elected as Member of Parliament for Bridport, Dorset, in the 1826 general election, he held the seat for 15 years until his resignation from the House of Commons in 1841. He was returned to the Commons at a by-election in November 1843, for Kendal, but did not seek re-election in 1847.

On Parliament he was active in the reform of bankruptcy, the repeal of stamp duty on newspapers, introduction of the penny post and in the campaigns of the Anti-Corn Law League.

== Early life ==
The son of John Warburton of Eltham, Kent, a timber merchant, he was educated at Eton College, and at Trinity College, Cambridge, where he was admitted 24 June 1802, aged 18. He was in the first class of the college examinations as freshman in 1803, and as junior soph in 1804. He was admitted scholar on 13 April 1804, graduated B.A. (being twelfth wrangler and placed next to Ralph Bernal) in 1806, and proceeded M.A. in 1812. George Pryme knew him in his undergraduate days, and both Bernal and Pryme were later his colleagues in politics.

For some years after leaving the university Warburton was engaged in the timber trade at Lambeth, but his taste for science and politics ultimately led to his abandoning commercial life.

His early interest was in mineralogy and geology and in 1808 he was elected as an early member of the Geological Society (founded 1807), serving as Secretary 1814–1816 and Vice-President 1816–1824. Warburton was one of the key contributors the Society's project for a geological map of England and Wales, published in 1820, providing facts from his field excursions and a significant share of the funding to underwrite the cost of its production. In 1824 Warburton was a key figure in the successful submission by the Geological Society for a Royal Charter, and, in 1825, was one the first to be nominated a Fellow of the Society.

He was elected Fellow of the Royal Society on 16 February 1809. William Hyde Wollaston was his closest friend, and in the autumn of 1818 they made a tour together on the continent. When Michael Faraday desired to become F.R.S., Warburton felt objections to his election, thinking that he had in one matter treated Wollaston unfairly. Correspondence ensued, and these objections were dispelled.

Warburton was also a member of the Political Economy Club from its foundation in 1821 to his death, bringing before it on 13 January 1823 the question 'how far rents and profits are affected by tithes'. David Ricardo was one of his friends, and often mentions Warburton in his Letters to Malthus. 'Philosopher Warburton,' as he was known, was one of the leading supporters of Henry Brougham in founding London University, and was a member of its first council in 1827.

== In politics ==
At the general election of 1826 Warburton was returned to parliament in the Radical interest for the borough of Bridport in Dorset, making his first long speech on 30 November on foreign goods, and was re-elected in 1830, 1831, 1833, 1835, 1837, and 1841, all of the elections after the Reform Bill being strongly contested. On 8 September 1841 he resigned his seat for that constituency on the ground that a petition would have 'proved gross bribery against his colleague' in which his own agent would have been implicated. It subsequently came out that before the passing of the Reform Bill he himself had paid large sums of money improperly to certain of the electors. The question whether bribery had been practised at Bridport was referred to a select committee, but nothing resulted from its investigations. Warburton was out of the house until 9 November 1843, when he was returned for the borough of Kendal.

In the House of Commons he worked with Joseph Hume, and after 1832 found fresh colleagues in Charles Buller, George Grote, and Sir William Molesworth. The medical reformers selected him as their advocate. He brought forward on 20 June 1827, and Robert Peel supported, a motion for an inquiry into the funds and regulations of the College of Surgeons. He was chairman of the parliamentary committee on the study of anatomy, which began its sittings on 28 April 1828, and after one failure, through the action of the House of Lords, succeeded in 1832 in carrying an anatomy bill. A committee on the medical profession was appointed on 11 February 1834, and Warburton became its chairman. He examined Sir Astley Cooper, Sir Charles Bell, and many others; but the conclusions of the committee were not submitted to parliament.

Warburton took an active part in 1831 in debates on bankruptcy. Early in 1833 he formed a project with Grote and John Arthur Roebuck for establishing a society for the diffusion of political and moral knowledge. He was intent in February 1835 on arranging a union of the Whigs under Lord John Russell with the followers of Daniel O'Connell; and it was he that sent to O'Connell a bundle of circulars from Russell, asking his friends to meet him at Lord Lichfield's house in St. James's Square, from which action resulted the Lichfield House compact. Warburton was for the repeal of the newspaper tax, and was active in the work of the Anti-Corn Law League. On the select committee of the House of Commons on postage in 1837 he strongly supported penny postage.

At the dissolution of 1847 he retired from political life, saying that the reforms which he had at heart had been made. He died at 45 Cadogan Place, London, on 16 September 1858, aged 73.

Parliament of the United Kingdom
Preceded by James Scott; Sir Horace St Paul, Bt	Member of Parliament for Bridport; 1826 – 1841; With: Sir Horace St Paul, Bt to 1832; John Romilly 1832–1835; Horace Twiss 1832–1837; Swynfen Jervis 1837–1841; Thomas Alexander Mitchell from June 1841	Succeeded by Alexander Baillie-Cochrane; Thomas Alexander Mitchell
Preceded by George William Wood	Member of Parliament for Kendal; 1843 – 1847	Succeeded by George Carr Glyn
