= Thomas Alexander Mitchell =

English politician

Thomas Alexander Mitchell (1812 – 16 March 1875) was an English Liberal politician who sat in the House of Commons from 1841 to 1875.

Mitchell was a merchant in the City of London. He was a partner in the firm of Mitchell, Yeames and Co, a member of the committee of management of Lloyds Shipping Register and chairman of the Chartered Bank of India, Australia and China.

At the 1841 general election, Mitchell was elected as one of the two Members of Parliament (MPs) for Bridport. He held the seat until his death 1875, aged 63.

Parliament of the United Kingdom
Preceded by Swynfen Jervis; Henry Warburton	Member of Parliament for Bridport; 1841 – 1875; With: Henry Warburton to Sept 1841; Alexander Baillie-Cochrane Sept 1841 – 1846; John Romilly 1846–47; Alexander Baillie-Cochrane 1847–52; John Patrick Murrough 1852–57; Kirkman Hodgson 1857–68 (only 1 seat from 1868)	Succeeded by Pandeli Ralli
