= Charles Sturt (1763–1812) =

British politician (1763–1812)

Member of Parliament for Bridport
- In office 1784–1802 Serving with Thomas Scott (1784); James Watson (1784-1790); George Barclay (1790-1802)
- Preceded by: Thomas Scott; Richard Beckford
- Succeeded by: George Barclay; Evan Nepean

Personal details
- Party: Whig
- Relations: Charles Sturt (nephew)
- Born: 20 March 1763
- Died: 12 May 1812 (aged 49)
- Children: Henry Sturt
- Father: Humphrey Sturt
- Relatives: Henry Sturt, 1st Baron Alington (grandson); Charles Napier Sturt (grandson)

Charles Sturt (20 March 1763 – 12 May 1812) was an English politician from the Whigs who was Member of Parliament for Bridport.

== See also ==
- List of MPs in the first United Kingdom Parliament
