= Sir Horace St Paul, 1st Baronet =

English soldier and Member of Parliament

Sir Horace David Cholwell St Paul, 1st Baronet (6 January 1775 – 8 October 1840) was an English soldier and Member of Parliament.

He was born in Paris, the eldest son of Horace St. Paul of Ewart Park, Northumberland. His younger brother was Henry St Paul, MP for Berwick-upon-Tweed from 1812 to 1820. It would be hard to describe St. Paul's background more clearly than R.G. Thorne does: 'St. Paul's father, a Northumbrian gentleman driven into exile after killing a man in a duel, was a soldier of fortune in the Seven Years' War, who returned to England with an Austrian title and a royal pardon, subsequently distinguishing himself in diplomacy, before retiring to his ancestral home.'

St Paul was educated at Houghton le Spring and Eton College (1783). He succeeded his father in 1812 as a count of the Austrian Empire.

He joined the British Army as an ensign in the 1st Foot regiment in 1793, and was promoted to lieutenant in 1794. He transferred to the 1st Dragoon Guards as a cornet in March 1794, became a lieutenant in July 1794 and a captain in 1798. He was then a major in the 5th Foot in 1802, rising to brevet lieutenant-colonel in 1811, and to colonel (on half-pay) in 1820.

He was elected MP for Bridport in 1812, sitting until 1820, when he was beaten by Christopher Spurrier. However he regained the seat on petition and sat again until 1832. He was created a baronet on 17 November 1813.

In 1832, he attempted to win the newly created seat of Dudley but was defeated by the Whig, Sir John Campbell.

He married, 14 May 1803, Anna Maria, the natural daughter and heiress of John Ward, 2nd Viscount Dudley and Ward and had a son and 5 daughters. He was succeeded by his son Horace (1812–91), MP for Worcestershire East, who succeeded him as count and baronet.

Parliament of the United Kingdom
Preceded by Sir Samuel Hood, Bt; Sir Evan Nepean, Bt	Member of Parliament for Bridport; 1812 – March 1820; With: William Best 1812–17; Henry Sturt 1817–20	Succeeded by Christopher Spurrier; James Scott
Preceded by Christopher Spurrier; James Scott	Member of Parliament for Bridport; June 1820 – 1832; With: James Scott to 1826; Henry Warburton from 1826	Succeeded by Henry Warburton; John Romilly
Baronetage of the United Kingdom
New creation	Baronet (of Ewart Park); 1813–1840	Succeeded by Horace St Paul
