= Battiscombe =

Battiscombe is a surname. Notable people with the surname include:

- Christopher Battiscombe (born 1940), British diplomat
- Georgina Battiscombe (1905–2006), British biographer
- Peter Battiscombe (died 1725), English politician
- Robert Battiscombe (1799–1881), English cricketer
