= John Romilly, 1st Baron Romilly =

English politician (1802–1874)

The Right Honourable The Lord Romilly PC
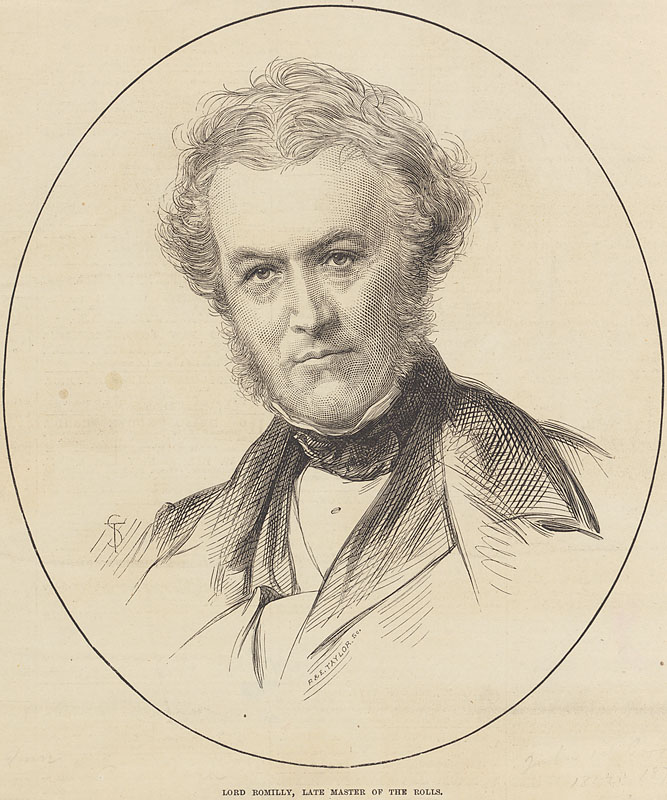

Master of the Rolls
- In office 1851–1873
- Monarch: Victoria
- Preceded by: The Lord Langdale
- Succeeded by: Sir George Jessel

Personal details
- Born: 20 January 1802 London, England
- Died: 23 December 1874 (aged 72) London, England
- Party: Whig
- Spouse: Caroline Charlotte Otter (m. 1833; died 1856)
- Children: 8
- Parent(s): Sir Samuel Romilly; Anne Garbett
- Education: Trinity College, Cambridge

John Romilly, 1st Baron Romilly PC (20 January 1802 – 23 December 1874), known as Sir John Romilly between 1848 and 1866, was an English Whig politician and judge. He served in Lord John Russell's first administration as Solicitor General from 1848 to 1850 and as Attorney General from 1850 and 1851. The latter year he was appointed Master of the Rolls, a post he held until 1873. Knighted in 1848, he was ennobled as Baron Romilly in 1866.

== Early life ==
Romilly was born in London, the second son of Sir Samuel Romilly and the former Anne Garbett, a daughter of Francis Garbett of Knill Court, Herefordshire. After serving as Solicitor General for England and Wales, his father became a Member of Parliament for Horsham, Wareham, Arundel, and Westminster. Among his siblings was sister Sophia Romilly (wife of Thomas Francis Kennedy, MP for Ayr Burghs), and younger brothers Charles Romilly (who married Lady Georgiana Russell, a daughter of John Russell, 6th Duke of Bedford), Frederick Romilly (who served as MP for Canterbury).

He was educated at Trinity College, Cambridge, and was called to the Bar at Gray's Inn, in 1827.

== Career ==
Romilly first entered Parliament in 1832 as member for Bridport in Dorset, holding the seat from 1832 to 1835 and again from 1846 to 1847. In 1843 he became a Queen's Counsel. He was elected Member of Parliament for Devonport in 1847, and was appointed Solicitor-General and knighted in 1848 in Lord John Russell's administration, being promoted to Attorney-General in 1850. In 1851 he was appointed Master of the Rolls, and continued to sit for Devonport until the general election in 1852, when he was defeated. He was the last Master of the Rolls to sit in Parliament.

Romilly was raised to the peerage as Baron Romilly, of Barry in the County of Glamorgan, in 1866, and retired from the mastership of the rolls in 1873. He did much to remove the restrictions which had long hampered research among the public records and state papers.

=== Notable judicial decisions ===
Notable judicial decisions of Romilly include: Norris v Chambres (1861) 29 Beav 246, 54 ER 621: whether an equitable lien could be claimed in immovable property overseas against a third party.

== Personal life ==
Lord Romilly married Caroline Charlotte, daughter of the Right Reverend William Otter, in 1833. They had several children, including:

- William Romilly, 2nd Baron Romilly (1835–1891), who married Emily Idonea Sophia Le Marchant, eldest daughter of Lieutenant-General Sir John Le Marchant, in 1865. After her death in 1866, he married Helen Denison, eldest daughter of Edward Hanson Denison, in 1872.
- Hon. Edward Romilly (1838–1886), a barrister who married Edith Mary Cowie (d. 1880), second daughter of Benjamin Morgan Cowie, Dean of Manchester, in 1871.
- Hon. Henry Romilly (1845–1886), who married Edith Rathbone, eldest daughter of Bernard Rathbone, in 1878. After his death in 1886, she married Thomas Northcote Toller of Lansdowne House in Didsbury in 1889.
- Hon. Arthur Romilly, barrister (1850–1884), who married Flora Schellbach (d. 1937), second daughter of Prof Schellbach of Berlin, in 1877.
- Hon. Anne Romilly (d. 1913), who married Clement Tudway Swanston QC (d. 1879) in 1861.
- Hon. Mary Romilly (d. 1921), who married Lieutenant-General Sir Lothian Nicholson KCB, Governor of Gibraltar (d. 1893) in 1864.
- Hon. Sophie Romilly (c. 1846–1895)
- Hon. Lucy Henrietta Romilly (d. 1923), who married Henry Crompton (d. 1904), second son of Charles John Crompton in 1870.

Lady Romilly died in December 1856. Lord Romilly died in London on 23 December 1874, aged 72, and was succeeded in the barony his eldest son, William. He is buried in Brompton Cemetery, London.

== Arms ==
Coat of arms of John Romilly, 1st Baron Romilly
Crest Upon a rock Proper a crescent Argent. Escutcheon Argent in base a rock with nine points issuant from each a lily all Proper on a chief Azure a crescent between two mullets of the first. Supporters On either side a greyhound Argent gorged with a collar fleury counterfleury Azure and charged on the shoulder with a lily slipped Proper. Motto Persevere

Parliament of the United Kingdom
Preceded by Sir Horace St Paul, Bt; Henry Warburton	Member of Parliament for Bridport; 1832–1835; With: Henry Warburton	Succeeded by Henry Warburton; Horace Twiss
Preceded by Thomas Alexander Mitchell; Alexander Baillie-Cochrane	Member of Parliament for Bridport; 1846–1847; With: Thomas Alexander Mitchell	Succeeded by Thomas Alexander Mitchell; Swynfen Jervis
Preceded by Henry Tufnell; Sir George Grey, Bt	Member of Parliament for Devonport; 1847 – 1852; With: Henry Tufnell	Succeeded by Henry Tufnell; Sir George Berkeley
Legal offices
Preceded by Sir David Dundas	Solicitor General for England and Wales; 1848–1850	Succeeded by Sir Alexander Cockburn, Bt
Preceded by Sir John Jervis	Attorney General for England and Wales; 1850–1851	Succeeded by Sir Alexander Cockburn, Bt
Preceded by The Lord Langdale	Master of the Rolls; 1851–1873	Succeeded by Sir George Jessel
Peerage of the United Kingdom
New creation	Baron Romilly; 1866–1874	Succeeded by William Romilly
