= Quintin Twiss =

English cricketer and actor

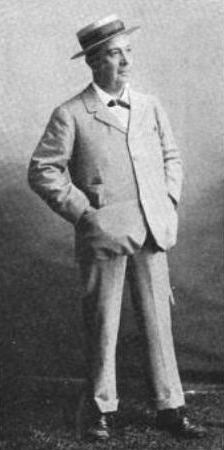

Personal information
- Full name: Quintin William Francis Twiss
- Born: 13 March 1835; Westminster, Middlesex, England
- Died: 7 August 1900 (aged 65); Westminster, London, England
- Batting: Unknown

Career statistics
Competition	First-class
Matches	1
Runs scored	4
Batting average	2.00
100s/50s	–/–
Top score	4
Catches/stumpings	1/–
- Source: Cricinfo, 4 August 2019

Quintin William Francis Twiss (13 March 1835 – 7 August 1900) was an English first-class cricketer and actor.

== Biography ==
The son of the politician Horace Twiss, he was born at Westminster in March 1835. Twiss was educated at Westminster School, before going up to Christ Church, Oxford. While at Oxford he developed an interest in acting and was known to Lewis Carroll, three years his senior. After graduating from Oxford, he became a clerk at the Treasury, though he maintained his status as a well known amateur actor by performing in numerous stage productions.

He appeared in first-class cricket for the Gentlemen of England against the Gentlemen of Kent and Sussex at Canterbury in 1857. Batting twice in the match, he was dismissed in the Gentlemen of England's first-innings without scoring by South Norton, while in their second-innings he was dismissed for 4 runs by the same bowler.

Twiss died at Westminster on 7 August 1900, and was buried at Brompton Cemetery. His extended family included his grandmother, the actress Frances Kemble, and his grandfather Francis Twiss.
