= Kirkman Hodgson =

Kirkman Daniel Hodgson, JP (1814 – 11 September 1879) was an East India merchant and banker, becoming a partner in the mercantile firm of Baring Brothers and Co. He later became Deputy Governor and Governor of the Bank of England (1863–1865) and a Member of Parliament in the United Kingdom. He first stood in Bridport in 1857 to 1868 and later stood in the constituency of Bristol after winning a by-election in 1870 and retaining the seat in the 1874 General Elections. His resignation triggered the 1878 Bristol by-election.

== Family ==
He was the son of John Hodgson, of The Elms, Hampstead. He attended Charterhouse School in 1826. Hodgson married Frances Butler (1822–1851) in 1843 and the children to the marriage were Caroline Anna and Robert Kirkman.

Hodgson died at his residence of Ashgrove, Sevenoaks, Kent.

Parliament of the United Kingdom
Preceded by John Patrick Murrough	Member of Parliament for Bridport; 1857–1868; With: Thomas Alexander Mitchell	Succeeded by Thomas Alexander Mitchell
Preceded by Elisha Smith Robinson	Member of Parliament for Bristol; 1870–1878; With: Samuel Morley 1868–1885	Succeeded by Lewis Fry
Government offices
Preceded by Alfred Latham	Governor of the Bank of England; 1863 – 1865	Succeeded by Henry Lancelot Holland
