= John Tracy =

John Tracy may refer to:

== Politicians ==
- John Tracy (New York politician) (1783–1864), American politician, Lieutenant Governor of New York
- John Tracy (Wisconsin politician) (1852–1931), Irish-born American politician
- John Tracy (MP for Bridport), MP for Bridport 1384–1399
- John Tracy (MP for Gloucestershire), see Gloucestershire (UK Parliament constituency)

== Others ==
- John Tracy, knight at the Siege of Calais
- John Tracy (aerospace executive) (born 1954)
- John Tracy, 1st Viscount Tracy, Irish peer
- John Tracy, 7th Viscount Tracy, (1722–1793), Warden of All Souls College, Oxford
- John Tracy (Medal of Honor) (1848–1918), American Indian Wars soldier
- John Tracy (director), American television director
- John Tracy (Thunderbirds), fictional character from Gerry Anderson's Supermarionation

== See also ==
- John Tracey (disambiguation)
- John Treacy (born 1957), Irish athlete and Olympic medallist
- John Patrick Treacy (1891–1964), American prelate of the Roman Catholic Church
- John Tracy Atkyns (died 1773), English barrister
