= Walter Tracy (MP) =

English Member of Parliament (fl.1413–1427)

Walter Tracy (fl. 1413–1427) of Dorchester, Dorset, was an English politician and lawyer.

Nothing is known of his family, although it is likely he is related to fellow MP for Bridport, John Tracy.

He was a Member (MP) of the Parliament of England for Dorchester in May 1413, for Bridport in 1419 and for Melcombe Regis in 1427.
