= Horace Twiss =

English writer and politician (1787–1849)

Horace Twiss KC (28 February 1787 – 4 May 1849) was an English writer and politician.

== Life ==
Twiss was born at Bath, Somerset, the son of Francis Twiss (1760–1827) and his wife Frances née Kemble (sister of Sarah Siddons née Kemble). He was a Shakespearian scholar. In his youth he wrote light articles for newspapers; he became a successful lawyer and was appointed a Queen's Counsel in 1827. In 1820 he was elected to Parliament, where, with some interruptions, he sat until 1841, holding the office of Under-Secretary of State for War and the Colonies in 1828–1830. In 1844 he was appointed vice-chancellor of the Duchy of Lancaster, a well-paid post which enabled him to enjoy his popularity in London society. For some years he wrote for The Times, in which he first compiled the parliamentary summary, and his daughter married first Francis Bacon (d. 1840) and then J. T. Delane, both of them editors of that paper. He was the author of The Public and Private Life of Lord Chancellor Eldon, and other volumes. He died suddenly in London on 4 May 1849, aged 62. He was survived by his son, Quintin Twiss.

== Notes ==
Parliament of the United Kingdom
| Preceded by William Taylor Money; Richard Ellison | Member of Parliament for Wootton Bassett; 1820–1830; With: Sir George Philips, Bt | Succeeded by Thomas Hyde Villiers; The Viscount Mahon |
| Preceded by Spencer Perceval; William Henry John Scott | Member of Parliament for Newport (Isle of Wight); 1830–1831; With: Spencer Perceval | Succeeded by James Joseph Hope-Vere; William Mount |
| Preceded by Henry Warburton; John Romilly | Member of Parliament for Bridport; 1835–1837; With: Henry Warburton | Succeeded by Swynfen Jervis; Henry Warburton |
Political offices
| Preceded by Lord Francis Leveson-Gower | Under-Secretary of State for War and the Colonies; 1828–1830 | Succeeded by Viscount Howick |
