= Bridport (constituency) =

Former parliamentary constituency in the United Kingdom

- Former borough constituency for the House of Commons

1295–1885
- Seats: two (1295-1868); one (1868-1885)
- Replaced by: West Dorset

Bridport was a parliamentary borough in Dorset, England, which elected two Members of Parliament (MP) to the House of Commons from 1295 until 1868, and then one member from 1868 until 1885, when the borough was abolished.

== History ==
Bridport was continuously represented in Parliament from the first. The medieval borough consisted of the parish of Bridport, a small port and market town, where the main economic interests were sailcloth and rope-making, as well as some fishing. (For some time in the 16th century, the town had a monopoly of making all cordage for the navy.) By 1831, the population of the borough was 4,242, and the town contained 678 houses.

The right to vote was at one period reserved to the town corporation (consisting of two bailiffs and 13 "capital burgesses"), but from 1628 it was exercised by all inhabitant householders paying scot and lot. This was a relatively liberal franchise for the period but nevertheless meant that only a fraction of the townsmen could vote: in 1806, the general election at which Bridport had the highest turnout in the last few years before the Reform Act, a total of 260 residents voted.

Bridport never reached the status of a pocket borough with an openly recognised "patron": the voters retained their freedom of choice and generally expected to extort a price for their votes, so much so that Oldfield recorded of one election in the early 19th century that "several candidates left them at the last election, in consequence of their demanding payment beforehand". Nevertheless, at various periods the borough came under the influence of local grandees and would usually return at least one of their nominees as MPs: the Russells (Dukes of Bedford) in the Elizabethan period and the Sturts in the latter half of the 18th century could normally rely on choosing one member. In 1572 the then Earl of Bedford made use of this influence to have his oldest son elected in defiance of the convention that the heirs of peers could not be members of the House of Commons; the only previous instance had been that of the Earl himself, who had remained an MP when he became heir to the Earldom in 1555. By vote of the House, the young Lord Russell was allowed to keep his seat for Bridport, and the precedent allowed other peers' heirs to sit from that point onwards.

Bridport retained both its seats under the Reform Act, the boundaries being extended to give it the requisite population - parts of the neighbouring parishes of Bradpole, Allington and Walditch, as well as Bridport Harbour, were brought in, increasing the population to about 6,000; in the election of 1832, the first after Reform, the registered electorate was 425. However, the constituency was too small to survive for long. One of its members was removed after the election of 1868 by the Second Reform Act; and the borough was abolished altogether in 1885, the town being incorporated into the Western Dorset county division.

== Members of Parliament ==
MPs 1295-1640 — MPs 1640-1868 — MPs 1868-1885 — Elections — References — Sources

=== MPs 1295–1640 ===
- Constituency created (1295)

Parliament	First member	Second member
1386	John Hayward	John Tracy
1388 (Feb.)	John Hayward	John Tracy
1388 (Sep)	John Tracy	William Cordell
1390 (Jan)	John Tracy	John Hayward
1390 (Nov)		
1391		
1393	John Tracy	John Hayward
1394	John Tracy	Gilbert Draper
1395	John Roger	John Hayward
1397 (Jan)	John Palmer	John Crouk
1397 (Sep)	John Hayward	John Crouk
1399	John Hayward	John Tracy
1401		
1402	Simon atte Ford	Nicholas Tracy
1404 (Jan)		
1404 (Oct)		
1406	Henry Rauf	Roger Stikelane
1407	Henry Rauf	Walter Batcok
1410	Thomas Lovell	John Roger I
1411		
1413 (Feb)		
1413 (May)	William Mountfort II	John Roger I
1414 (Apr)	Simon atte Ford	John Stampe
1414 (Nov)	Simon atte Ford	Andrew Forshey
1415		
1416 (Mar)		
1416 (Oct)		
1417	Simon atte Ford	Edward Stikelane
1419	Walter Tracy	William Mountfort II
1420	Simon atte Ford	John Stampe
1421 (May)	Simon atte Ford	John Hore
1421 (Dec)	Simon atte Ford	William Pernham
1422	Simon atte Ford	
1423	Simon atte Ford	
1425	Simon atte Ford	
1426	John Hore	Simon atte Ford
1437	John Hore	
1529	William Chard	Richard Furloke
1545	John Lympany	Richard Watkins
1547	Sir Henry Gates	William Grimston
First Parliament of 1553	?	?
Second Parliament of 1553	Christopher Smith	William Pole
Parliament of 1554	Robert Neyl	Edward Prout
Parliament of 1554-1555	John Alferd	John Moyne or Moon
Parliament of 1555	Robert Fowkes	Thomas Chard
Parliament of 1558	John Hippisley	Thomas Welshe
Parliament of 1559	William Page	Robert Moon
Parliament of 1563-1567	John Hastings	Richard Inkpenne
Parliament of 1571	Thomas Parry	George Trenchard
Parliament of 1572-1581	Miles Sandys	Lord Russell (Summoned to the Lords); 1581: Hugh Vaughan
Parliament of 1584-1585	Dr Peter Turner	Morgan Moon
Parliament of 1586-1587	Dr Peter Turner	Morgan Moon
Parliament of 1588-1589	George Pawlet	Gregory Sprint
Parliament of 1593	Christopher Lambert	John Fortescue
Parliament of 1597-1598	Leweston Fitzjames	Adrian Gilbert
Parliament of 1601	Sir Robert Napier	Richard Warburton
Parliament of 1604-1611	Robert Meller	John Pitt
Addled Parliament (1614)	Sir William Bampfield	John Jeffrey
Parliament of 1621-1622	John Strode	John Browne
Happy Parliament (1624-1625)	William Muschamp	Robert Browne
Useless Parliament (1625)	Sir Lewis Dyve	Sir John Strode
Parliament of 1625-1626	Sir Lewis Dyve	Sir Richard Strode
Parliament of 1628-1629	Thomas Pawlet	Bampfield Chafin
No Parliament summoned 1629-1640

Back to Members of Parliament

=== MPs 1640–1868 ===
Year	First member	First party	Second member	Second party
April 1640	Thomas Trenchard		Sir John Meller	
November 1640	Roger Hill	Parliamentarian	Giles Strangways	Royalist
January 1644	Roger Hill	Parliamentarian	Strangways disabled from sitting - seat vacant	
1645	Roger Hill	Parliamentarian	Thomas Ceeley	
December 1648	Roger Hill	Parliamentarian	Ceeley excluded in Pride's Purge - seat vacant	
1653	Bridport was unrepresented in the Barebones Parliament and the First and Second Parliaments of the Protectorate			
January 1659	Edward Cheek		John Lee	
May 1659	Roger Hill		One seat vacant	
April 1660	John Drake		Henry Henley	
1661	Humphrey Bishop		John Strangways	
February 1677	George Bowerman		John Strangways	
February 1677	George Bowerman		Wadham Strangways	
February 1679	John Every		Wadham Strangways	
August 1679	Sir Robert Henley, Bt		William Bragge	
1681	John Michell		William Bragge	
1685	Hugh Hodges		Thomas Chafe	
1689	Richard Brodrepp		John Manley	
1690	John Michell		Sir Stephen Evance	
1695	Nicholas Carey		Sir Stephen Evance	
1697	Peter Battiscombe		Sir Stephen Evance	
1698	Peter Battiscombe		Alexander Pitfield	
1701	William Gulston		Alexander Pitfield	
1702	Richard Bingham		Alexander Pitfield	
1705	Thomas Strangways		Alexander Pitfield	
1708	Thomas Strangways		William Coventry	
1713	John Hoskins Gifford		William Coventry	
February 1715	John Strangways		William Coventry	
May 1715	Peter Walter		William Coventry	
1719	Peter Walter		Sir Dewey Bulkeley	
1727	William Bowles		James Pelham	
1730	William Bowles		John Jewkes	
1734	William Bowles		Solomon Ashley	
1741	William Bowles		George Richards	
1742	Viscount Deerhurst	Tory	George Richards	
1744	Viscount Deerhurst	Tory	George Richards	
1746	Viscount Deerhurst	Tory	Thomas Grenville	
May 1747	Viscount Deerhurst	Tory	James Grenville	
July 1747	John Frederick Pinney		James Grenville	
1754	John Frederick Pinney		Thomas Coventry	
1761	Sir Gerard Napier, 6th Baronet		Thomas Coventry	
1765	Benjamin Way		Thomas Coventry	
1768	Sambrooke Freeman		Thomas Coventry	
1774	Hon. Lucius Cary		Thomas Coventry	
1780	Thomas Scott	Whig	Richard Beckford	
1784	Thomas Scott	Whig	Charles Sturt	Whig
1790	James Watson	Whig	Charles Sturt	Whig
1795	George Barclay	Whig	Charles Sturt	Whig
1802	George Barclay	Whig	Sir Evan Nepean, Bt	Tory
1807	Sir Samuel Hood, Bt	Tory	Sir Evan Nepean, Bt	Tory
1812	William Best	Whig	Sir Horace St Paul, Bt	Tory
1817	Henry Sturt	Tory	Sir Horace St Paul, Bt	Tory
March 1820	James Scott	Whig	Christopher Spurrier	Whig
June 1820	James Scott	Whig	Sir Horace St Paul, Bt	Tory
1826	Henry Warburton	Radical	Sir Horace St Paul, Bt	Tory
1832	Henry Warburton	Radical	John Romilly	Whig
1835	Henry Warburton	Radical	Horace Twiss	Conservative
1837	Henry Warburton	Radical	Swynfen Jervis	Radical
June 1841	Henry Warburton	Radical	Thomas Alexander Mitchell	Radical
September 1841 by-election	Alexander Baillie-Cochrane	Conservative	Thomas Alexander Mitchell	Radical
1846 by-election	John Romilly	Whig	Thomas Alexander Mitchell	Radical
1847	Alexander Baillie-Cochrane	Conservative	Thomas Alexander Mitchell	Radical
1852	John Patrick Murrough	Radical	Thomas Alexander Mitchell	Radical
1857	Kirkman Hodgson	Whig	Thomas Alexander Mitchell	Radical
1859	Kirkman Hodgson	Liberal	Thomas Alexander Mitchell	Liberal
1868	Representation reduced to one member			

Back to Members of Parliament

=== MPs 1868–1885 ===
Year	Member	Party
1868	Thomas Alexander Mitchell	Liberal
1875 by-election	Pandeli Ralli	Liberal
1880	Charles Warton	Conservative
1885	Constituency abolished	

Back to Members of Parliament

== Elections ==
1830s – 1840s – 1850s – 1860s – 1870s – 1880s – References – Sources

=== Elections in the 1830s ===
General election 1830: Bridport
Party	Candidate	Votes	%	±%
Radical	Henry Warburton	Unopposed		
Tory	Sir Horace St Paul, 1st Baronet	Unopposed		
Radical hold				
Tory hold				

General election 1831: Bridport
Party	Candidate	Votes	%	±%
Radical	Henry Warburton	Unopposed		
Tory	Sir Horace St Paul, 1st Baronet	Unopposed		
Radical hold				
Tory hold				

General election 1832: Bridport
Party	Candidate	Votes	%	±%
Radical	Henry Warburton	271	40.3	N/A
Whig	John Romilly	219	32.6	N/A
Tory	Richard William Astell	182	27.1	N/A
Turnout		400	94.1	N/A
Registered electors		425		
Majority		52	7.7	N/A
Radical hold		Swing	N/A	
Majority		37	5.5	N/A
Whig gain from Tory		Swing	N/A	

General election 1835: Bridport
Party	Candidate	Votes	%	±%
Radical	Henry Warburton	244	37.5	−2.8
Conservative	Horace Twiss	207	31.8	+4.7
Whig	John Romilly	199	30.6	−2.0
Turnout		394	93.8	−0.3
Registered electors		420		
Majority		37	5.7	−2.0
Radical hold		Swing	−2.6	
Majority		8	1.2	N/A
Conservative gain from Whig		Swing	+3.4	

General election 1837: Bridport
Party	Candidate	Votes	%	±%
Radical	Henry Warburton	283	38.9	+20.2
Radical	Swynfen Jervis	232	31.9	+13.2
Conservative	Henry Baillie	212	29.2	−2.6
Majority		20	2.7	−3.0
Turnout		445	88.1	−5.7
Registered electors		505		
Radical hold		Swing	+10.8	
Radical gain from Conservative		Swing	+7.3	

=== Elections in the 1840s ===
General election 1841: Bridport
Party	Candidate	Votes	%	±%
Radical	Henry Warburton	304	36.6	−2.3
Radical	Thomas Alexander Mitchell	282	34.0	+2.1
Conservative	Alexander Baillie-Cochrane	244	29.4	+0.2
Majority		38	4.6	+1.9
Turnout		506	90.8	+2.7
Registered electors		557		
Radical hold		Swing	−1.2	
Radical hold		Swing	+1.0	

Warburton resigned by accepting the office of Steward of the Chiltern Hundreds, causing a by-election.

By-election, 15 September 1841: Bridport
Party	Candidate	Votes	%	±%
Conservative	Alexander Baillie-Cochrane	Unopposed		
Conservative gain from Radical				

Baillie-Cochrane resigned by accepting the office of Steward of the Chiltern Hundreds in order to seek re-election as a supporter of free trade.

By-election, 7 March 1846: Bridport
Party	Candidate	Votes	%	±%
Conservative	Alexander Baillie-Cochrane	240	50.1	+20.7
Whig	John Romilly	239	49.9	N/A
Majority		1	0.2	N/A
Turnout		479	83.9	−6.9
Registered electors		571		
Conservative gain from Radical		Swing	N/A	

After scrutiny, Baillie-Cochrane's election was declared void and Romilly was declared elected on 28 April 1846.

General election 1847: Bridport
Party	Candidate	Votes	%	±%
Conservative	Alexander Baillie-Cochrane	276	35.6	+6.2
Radical	Thomas Alexander Mitchell	267	34.4	−36.2
Whig	Edward Richard Petre	222	28.6	N/A
Conservative	Robert Montgomery Martin	11	1.4	N/A
Turnout		388 (est)	58.5 (est)	−32.3
Registered electors		663		
Majority		9	1.2	N/A
Conservative gain from Radical		Swing	+21.2	
Majority		45	5.8	+1.2
Radical hold		Swing	−21.2	

Martin withdrew his name early into polling.

Back to Elections

=== Elections in the 1850s ===
General election 1852: Bridport
Party	Candidate	Votes	%	±%
Radical	Thomas Alexander Mitchell	366	45.4	+28.2
Radical	John Patrick Murrough	249	30.9	+13.7
Conservative	John Rolt	191	23.7	−13.3
Majority		58	7.2	+1.4
Turnout		403 (est)	76.9 (est)	+18.4
Registered electors		524		
Radical hold		Swing	+17.4	
Radical gain from Conservative		Swing	+10.2	

General election 1857: Bridport
Party	Candidate	Votes	%	±%
Radical	Thomas Alexander Mitchell	330	45.3	−0.1
Whig	Kirkman Hodgson	290	39.8	N/A
Conservative	William Unwin Heygate	109	15.0	−8.7
Turnout		365 (est)	76.4 (est)	−0.5
Registered electors		478		
Majority		40	5.5	−1.7
Radical hold		Swing	+4.3	
Majority		181	24.8	N/A
Whig gain from Radical		Swing	N/A	

General election 1859: Bridport
Party	Candidate	Votes	%	±%
Liberal	Thomas Alexander Mitchell	334	42.1	−3.2
Liberal	Kirkman Hodgson	290	36.5	−3.3
Conservative	Henry Hyde Nugent Bankes	170	21.4	+6.4
Majority		120	15.1	+9.6
Turnout		397 (est)	79.2 (est)	+2.8
Registered electors		501		
Liberal hold		Swing	−3.2	
Liberal hold		Swing	−3.2	

Back to Elections

=== Elections in the 1860s ===
General election 1865: Bridport
Party	Candidate	Votes	%	±%
Liberal	Thomas Alexander Mitchell	Unopposed		
Liberal	Kirkman Hodgson	Unopposed		
Registered electors		472		
Liberal hold				
Liberal hold				

The seat was reduced to one member.

General election 1868: Bridport
Party	Candidate	Votes	%	±%
Liberal	Thomas Alexander Mitchell	Unopposed		
Registered electors		1,027		
Liberal hold				

Back to Elections

=== Elections in the 1870s ===
General election 1874: Bridport
Party	Candidate	Votes	%	±%
Liberal	Thomas Alexander Mitchell	Unopposed		
Registered electors		1,045		
Liberal hold				

Mitchell's death caused a by-election.

By-election, 31 Mar 1875: Bridport
Party	Candidate	Votes	%	±%
Liberal	Pandeli Ralli	620	76.6	N/A
Conservative	Charles Whetham	189	23.4	New
Majority		431	53.2	N/A
Turnout		809	80.0	N/A
Registered electors		1,011		
Liberal hold		Swing	N/A	

Back to Elections

=== Elections in the 1880s ===
General election 1880: Bridport
Party	Candidate	Votes	%	±%
Conservative	Charles Warton	468	50.5	N/A
Liberal	Pandeli Ralli	459	49.5	N/A
Majority		9	1.0	N/A
Turnout		927	85.4	N/A
Registered electors		1,085		
Conservative gain from Liberal		Swing	N/A	

Back to Elections

== Sources ==
- Beatson, Robert (1807). A Chronological Register of Both Houses of the British Parliament, from the Union in 1708, to the Third Parliament of the United Kingdom of Great Britain and Ireland, in 1807. Longman, Hurst, Rees, and Orme.
- Brunton, Douglas; Pennington, Donald Henshaw (1954). Members of the Long Parliament: by D. Brunton and D.H. Pennington. London: George Allen & Unwin.
- Concise Dictionary of National Biography (1930)
- Craig, F. W. S. (1977). British parliamentary election results 1832-1885 (2 ed.). London: Macmillan. ISBN 0333171535.
- Cobbett's Parliamentary history of England, from the Norman Conquest in 1066 to the year 1803, London: Thomas Hansard, 1808, archived from the original on 4 September 2015
- Neale, J.E. (1949). The Elizabethan House of Commons. London: Jonathan Cape.
- Oldfield, T. H. B. (1816), The Representative History of Great Britain and Ireland, London: Baldwin, Cradock & Joy
- Philbin, J. Holladay (1965). Parliamentary representation, 1832: England and Wales. New Haven: Yale University Press.
- Porritt, Edward; Porritt, Annie G. (1903), The Unreformed House of Commons, Cambridge University Press
- Willis, Browne (1750). Notitia Parliamentaria, Part II: A Series or Lists of the Representatives in the several Parliaments held from the Reformation 1541, to the Restoration 1660 ... London.
- Leigh Rayment's Historical List of MPs – Constituencies beginning with "B" (part 5)
