= Simon Swynfen Jervis =

British museum director (born 1943)

Simon Swynfen Jervis FSA (born 9 January 1943) is a British museum director and art historian.

His first museum post was at what is now known as Leicester Museum and Art Gallery in 1964, later joining the Department of Furniture at the Victoria and Albert Museum, London, in 1966. He was Director of the Fitzwilliam Museum, Cambridge, from 1990 to 1995, and Historic Buildings Secretary of the National Trust from 1995 to 2002.

He served as president of the Society of Antiquaries of London from 1995 to 2001. In 2021, he was elected president of the Furniture History Society.

== Selected publications ==
- Jervis, Simon Swynfen (ed.). The Alphabet Book of Amos Lewis: An Elizabethan calligraphic manuscript revealed. Cambridge, John Adamson, 2024 ISBN 978-1-898565-20-8 OCLC 1422226157
- Jervis, Simon Swynfen. British and Irish Inventories: A list and bibliography of published transcriptions of secular inventories. Leeds, Furniture History Society, 2010 ISBN 978-0-903335-15-7 OCLC 715291123
- Jervis, Simon Swynfen. The Facts on File Dictionary of Design and Designers. New York, Facts on File, 1984 ISBN 0-87196-891-6 OCLC 10208241
- Jervis, Simon Swynfen. High Victorian Design. Woodbridge, Boydell, 1983 ISBN 978-0-85115-187-8 OCLC 10420428
- Jervis, Simon Swynfen. John Stafford of Bath and his Interior Decorations. Haywards Heath, Furniture History Society, 2009 ISBN 978-0-903335-14-0 OCLC 712130963
- Jervis, Simon Swynfen. The Penguin Dictionary of Design and Designers. Harmondsworth, Penguin Books, 1984 ISBN 978-0-14-051089-8 OCLC 59157313
- Jervis, Simon Swynfen. Printed Furniture Designs before 1650. Leeds, W. S. Maney & Sons Ltd for the Furniture History Society, 1974 ISBN 978-0-901286-05-5 OCLC 3186842
- Jervis, Simon Swynfen (editor and translator). A Rare Treatise on Interior Decoration and Architecture: Joseph Friedrich zu Racknitz's Presentation and History of the Taste of the Leading Nations. Los Angeles, Getty Research Institute, 2019 ISBN 978-1-60606-624-9 OCLC 1140126412
- Jervis, Simon Swynfen, and Dudley Dodd. Roman Splendour, English Arcadia: The English taste for Pietre Dure and the Sixtus cabinet at Stourhead. London, Philip Wilson, 2015 ISBN 978-1-78130-024-4 OCLC 897501952
- Jervis, Simon Swynfen, Swynfen Jervis MP, 1797−1867: Radical Landowner, Poetaster, Pteridologist and Shakespearian. Stafford, Staffordshire Record Society, 2020 ISBN 978-0-901719-16-4 OCLC 1231563032
- Jervis, Simon Swynfen. Victorian Furniture. London, Sydney, Ward Lock, 1968 ISBN 978-0-7063-1014-6 OCLC 20308
