= Christopher Lambert (disambiguation) =

Christopher Lambert (born 1957) is a French actor.

Christopher Lambert may also refer to:

- Christopher Lambert (MP) (16th century), English politician
- Christopher James Lambert (born 1973), English footballer
- Christopher Sebastian Lambert (1935–1981), manager of The Who

== See also ==
- Christophe Lambert (disambiguation)
- Chris Lambert (disambiguation)
