= Chris Lambert =

Chris Lambert may refer to:

- Chris Lambert (sprinter) (born 1981), English professional sprinter
- Chris Lambert (baseball) (born 1983), American Major League baseball pitcher
- Chris Lambert (footballer) (1921–2005), Australian rules footballer
- Chris Lambert (racing driver) (died 1968), British racing driver, killed in a Formula Two race at Circuit Park Zandvoort
- Chris Lambert (musician), American singer-songwriter and musician

== See also ==
- Christopher Lambert (disambiguation)
