= Walter Batcok =

English politician

Walter Batcok (fl. 1387–1415) was an English politician. He sat as MP for Bridport in 1407.

He also served as cofferer of Bridport from Michaelmas 1387 till 1389, 1396 till 1397, 1405 till 1406; bailiff from 1395 till 1396; constable from 1401 till 1402 and 1409 till 1410.

He married Alice and had one son.
