= Richard Rogers (died 1643) =

Richard Rogers (c. 1611–1643) was an English landed gentleman and soldier who sat in the House of Commons from 1640 to 1642. He supported the Royalist side in the English Civil War.

Rogers was the son of Sir John Rogers of Kilve. His father died in 1613, and his mother married again, becoming Margaret Banastre. Rogers came of age in 1632.

In April 1640, Rogers was elected as one of the two Members of Parliament for Dorset in the Short Parliament. After being re-elected for Dorset to the Long Parliament later in the year, on 12 September 1642 he was disabled from sitting for sending forces into Sherborne Castle.

Rogers married Anne Cheek, a daughter of Sir Thomas Cheek of Pirgo, and they had two daughters, Elizabeth and Rogersa. After the death of Rogers in 1643, aged 32, his widow married Robert Rich, 3rd Earl of Warwick. His daughters and co-heiresses were left in the guardianship of his mother and of Sir Lancelot Lake, the husband of Anne's sister Frances. Elizabeth Rogers married firstly Charles Cavendish, Viscount Mansfield, and secondly Charles Stewart, 6th Duke of Lennox. Rogersa married Sir Henry Belasyse.

Parliament of England
| Vacant Parliament suspended since 1629 | Member of Parliament for Dorset; 1640–1642; With: Lord Digby 1640; John Browne 1641–1642 | Succeeded by John Browne; Sir Thomas Trenchard |
