= John Tracey (disambiguation) =

John Tracey may refer to:

- John Tracey, American football player
- John P. Tracey, American congressman
- John Tracey (warden) (1722–1793), warden of All Souls College, Oxford 1766–1793

== See also ==
- John Tracy (disambiguation)
- John Treacy, Irish Olympic medallist
