= Alexander Baillie-Cochrane, 1st Baron Lamington =

British politician (1816-1890)

The Right Honourable The Lord Lamington
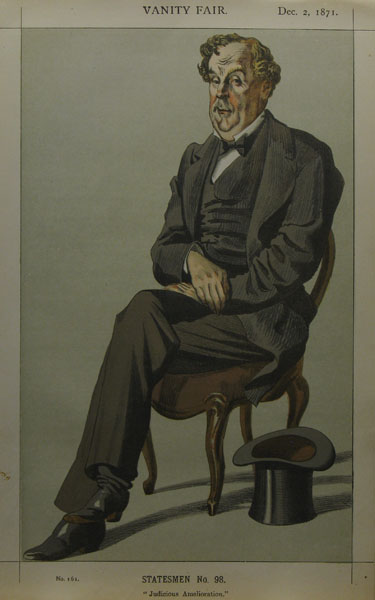
- "Judicious Amelioration"; Baillie-Cochrane as caricatured by James Tissot in Vanity Fair, December 1871

Member of Parliament for Bridport
- In office 1841–1846 Serving with Thomas Alexander Mitchell
- Preceded by: Henry Warburton; Thomas Alexander Mitchell
- Succeeded by: John Romilly; Thomas Alexander Mitchell

Member of Parliament for Lanarkshire
- In office 1857–1857
- Preceded by: William Lockhart
- Succeeded by: Sir Thomas Edward Colebrooke

Member of Parliament for Honiton
- In office 1859–1868 Serving with Joseph Locke (1859-1860); George Moffatt (1860–1865); Frederick Goldsmid (1865–1866); Julian Goldsmid (1866–1868)
- Preceded by: Joseph Locke and Archibald Stuart-Wortley
- Succeeded by: Constituency abolished

Member of Parliament for Isle of Wight
- In office 1870–1880 Serving with Joseph Locke (1859-1860); George Moffatt (1860–1865); Frederick Goldsmid (1865–1866); Julian Goldsmid (1866–1868)
- Preceded by: Sir John Simeon, Bt.
- Succeeded by: Evelyn Ashley

Personal details
- Born: 24 November 1816
- Died: 15 February 1890 (aged 73)
- Party: Conservative
- Spouse: Annabella Mary Elizabeth Drummond (m. 1844)
- Children: 4
- Parent: Sir Thomas John Cochrane (father)
- Relatives: Charles Wallace Alexander Napier (son); Alexander Cochrane (paternal grandfather); Reginald Windsor Sackville (son-in-law)
- Education: Eton College; Christ Church, Oxford; Trinity College, Cambridge

Alexander Dundas Ross Cochrane-Wishart-Baillie, 1st Baron Lamington (24 November 1816 – 15 February 1890), better known as Alexander Baillie-Cochrane, was a British Conservative politician perhaps best known for his association with Young England in the early 1840s.

The son of Admiral of the Fleet Sir Thomas John Cochrane, he succeeded to the Baillie estate at Lamington in 1833.

He was educated at Eton College, matriculated at Christ Church, Oxford, in June 1835, then transferred to Trinity College, Cambridge, in February 1836. He was President of the Cambridge Union in 1837.

He entered parliament as a member for Bridport in 1841. He later sat for Lanarkshire, Honiton, and finally the Isle of Wight until 1880 when he was made a peer and went to the House of Lords as Baron Lamington, of Lamington in the County of Lanark.

In 1844 he married Annabella Mary Elizabeth Drummond, daughter of Andrew Drummond of Cadlands, Hampshire and a granddaughter of John Manners, 5th Duke of Rutland. Through the marriage of Annabella's sister Frederica, he was brother-in-law to the Earl of Scarborough.

They had four children. He was succeeded in his honours and lands by his only son, Charles Wallace Alexander Napier, second baron Lamington, who was appointed Governor of Queensland in 1895. A daughter Constance Mary Elizabeth Baillie-Cochrane (1846–1929) married Reginald Windsor Sackville, 7th Earl De La Warr, on 7 February 1867.

== Sources ==
- Blake, Robert (1966). Disraeli. New York: St. Martin's Press. ISBN 0-19-832903-2.
- Leigh Rayment's Historical List of MPs
- Lee, Sidney, ed. (1901). "Cochrane-Baillie, Alexander Dundas Ross Wishart" . Dictionary of National Biography (1st supplement). London: Smith, Elder & Co.

Parliament of the United Kingdom
Preceded by Henry Warburton and Thomas Alexander Mitchell	Member of Parliament for Bridport; 1841–1846; With: Thomas Alexander Mitchell	Succeeded by John Romilly and Thomas Alexander Mitchell
Preceded by William Lockhart	Member of Parliament for Lanarkshire; 1857	Succeeded by Sir Thomas Edward Colebrooke
Preceded by Joseph Locke and Archibald Stuart-Wortley	Member of Parliament for Honiton; 1859–1868; With: Joseph Locke, to 1860; George Moffatt, 1860–1865; Frederick Goldsmid, 1865–1866; Julian Goldsmid, 1866–1868	Constituency abolished
Preceded by Sir John Simeon, Bt.	Member of Parliament for Isle of Wight; 1870–1880	Succeeded by Evelyn Ashley
Peerage of the United Kingdom
New creation	Baron Lamington; 1880–1890	Succeeded by Charles Cochrane-Baillie
