= Christophe Lambert =

Christophe Lambert may refer to:

- Christophe Lambert (footballer) (born 1987), Swiss footballer
- Christophe Lambert (judoka) (born 1985), German judoka
- Christophe Lambert, known as Christopher Lambert (born 1957), American-born French actor
- Christophe Lambert, CEO of EuropaCorp (2010–2016)

== See also ==
- Christopher Lambert (disambiguation)
