= 1875 Bridport by-election =

UK parliamentary by-election

The Bridport by-election of 1875 was fought on 31 March 1875. The by-election was fought due to the death of the incumbent Liberal MP, Thomas Alexander Mitchell. It was won by the Liberal candidate Pandeli Ralli.

== Results ==
By-election, 31 Mar 1875: Bridport
| Party | Candidate | Votes | % | ±% |
|---|---|---|---|---|
| Liberal | Pandeli Ralli | 620 | 76.6 | N/A |
| Conservative | Charles Whetham | 189 | 23.4 | New |
| Majority | | 431 | 53.2 | N/A |
| Turnout | | 809 | 80.0 | N/A |
| Registered electors | | 1,011 | | |
| Liberal hold | | Swing | N/A | |
