= Anne Digby, Countess of Bristol =

The Right Honourable The Countess of Bristol

Countess of Bristol
- Reign: 12 July 1725 – December 1744 (19 years)
- Predecessor: Beatrice Walcott
- Successor: Rachel Wyndham
- Born: Lady Anne Russell c. 1620
- Died: 26 January 1697 (1697 (aged 76–77)
- Noble family: Russell (by birth); Digby (by marriage)
- Spouse: George Digby, 2nd Earl of Bristol (m. 1700)
- Issue: John Digby, 3rd Earl of Bristol; Francis Digby; Diana Digby, Baroness de Herent; Anne Digby, Countess of Sunderland
- Father: Francis Russell, 4th Earl of Bedford
- Mother: The Honourable Catherine Brydges

Anne Digby, Countess of Bristol (c. 1620 – 26 January 1697), formerly Lady Anne Russell, was the wife of George Digby, 2nd Earl of Bristol, and the mother of the 3rd Earl.

Anne was the daughter of Francis Russell, 4th Earl of Bedford, and his wife. Her eldest brother was William Russell, 1st Duke of Bedford, and another brother was the Royalist Colonel John Russell. Two of her sisters also became countesses.

She married George Digby when he was heir to John Digby, 1st Earl of Bristol. The 1st Earl was executed by order of Parliament in 1653, and George succeeded to the earldom while an exile at the court of the future King Charles II of England in Holland. Together they had four children:

- John Digby, 3rd Earl of Bristol (c.1635-1698), who was married twice: first, to Alice Bourne, and second, to Rachael Wyndham, and had no children from either marriage.
- Francis Digby (d. 1672), died unmarried.
- Diana Digby, who, in 1658, married Rene de Mol, Baron de Herent (died 1691), a nobleman of Flanders and had issue, including Jean-Baptiste, Baron de Herent, who was later styled "Comte de Bristole". Like her father she was a convert to Catholicism.
- Anne Digby (c.1646-1715), who married Robert Spencer, 2nd Earl of Sunderland, and had children.

The countess was described by Anna Brownell Jameson as "a woman of the most amiable character and unblemished life" (whereas her husband was described as "a compound of great virtues and great vices".
