= Richard Twiss (writer) =

English writer

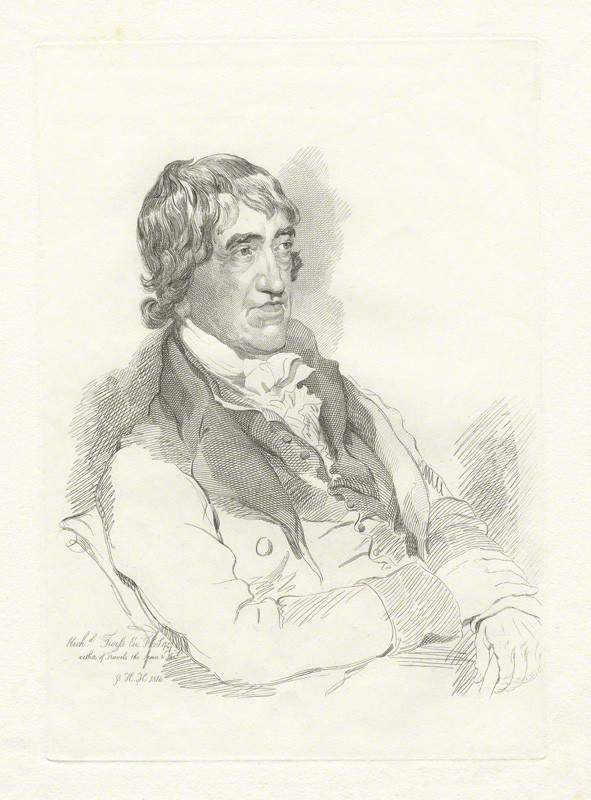
Richard Twiss, 1814 etching by Mary Dawson Turner

Richard Twiss (1747–1821) was an English writer, known for books on travel and chess.

== Life ==
Born at Rotterdam on 26 April 1747, he was the son of an English merchant living in Holland; Francis Twiss the writer was his younger brother. With an ample fortune, he travelled, and visited Scotland. He then journeyed through Holland, Belgium, France, Switzerland, Italy, Germany, and Bohemia till 1770, when he returned to England. In 1772 he went to Spain and Portugal, returning the following year. He was elected a fellow of the Royal Society in 1774; but left it in 1794. In 1775 he visited Ireland.

Subsequently, Twiss concentrated on literature and the fine arts. A project to manufacture paper lost him money. He revisited France during the French Revolution, and wrote on his experiences.

Twiss died in Somers Town, London 5 March 1821.

== Works ==
Twiss wrote:

- Travels through Portugal and Spain in 1772 and 1773, London, 1775; the volume contains a print of "Our Lady of the Fish", drawn by Giovanni Battista Cipriani and engraved by Francesco Bartolozzi. It appeared the same year in Dublin, and French and German editions were issued the following year.
- Tour in Ireland in 1775, London, 1776, several Irish editions. In the appendix he states he had taken 16 sea voyages and travelled altogether about 27,000 miles. The book was disliked in Ireland. It provoked William Preston to wax satirical in An Heroic Epistle by Donna Teresa Pinna y Ruiz of Murcia, supposedly known to Twiss, and An Heroic Answer from R. Twiss, esq., to Donna Teresa, Dublin, 1776. "Twiss" became or was proposed as rhyming slang for "piss" or chamber pot.
- A Trip to Paris in July and August 1792, London, 1793, also issued in two vols. in Dublin.
- Chess, published anonymously, London, 1787–89, 2 vols.
- Miscellanies, London, 1805, 2 vols.
