= William Cordell (MP) =

English politician

William Cordell (died 1395/96), of Bridport, Dorset was an English politician.

He was a member (MP) of the parliament of England for Bridport in September 1388.
