= 1870 Isle of Wight by-election =

UK Parliamentary by-election

The 1870 Isle of Wight by-election was fought on 10 June 1870. The election occurred as a result of the death of the incumbent MP of the Liberal Party, Sir John Simeon, 3rd Baronet. The Conservative candidate Alexander Baillie-Cochrane was elected over his Liberal opponent by a margin of 35 votes.

1870 Isle of Wight by-election
Party	Candidate	Votes	%	±%
Conservative	Alexander Baillie-Cochrane	1,317	50.7	+5.5
Liberal	George Moffatt	1,282	49.3	−5.5
Majority		35	1.4	N/A
Turnout		2,599	68.3	+3.4
Registered electors		3,807		
Conservative gain from Liberal		Swing	+5.5	
