= Nicholas Goodison =

British businessman (1934–2021)

Sir Nicholas P. Goodison
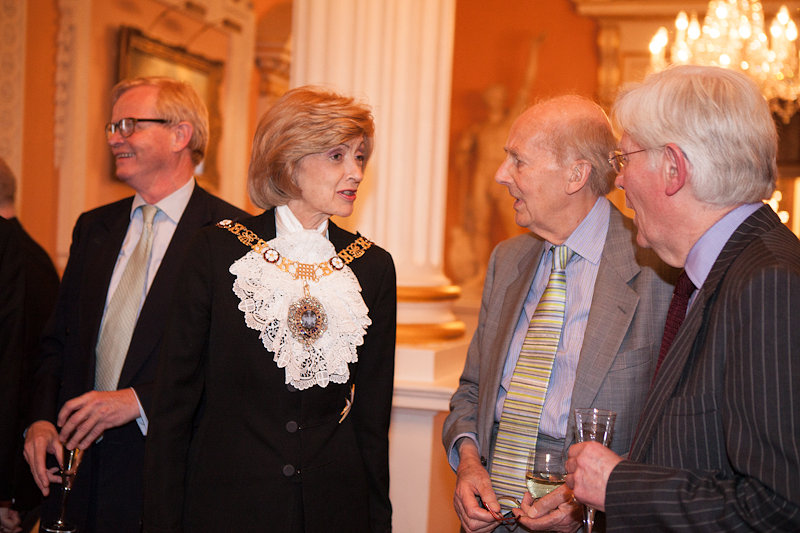
- Dame Fiona Woolf, Lord Mayor of London 2013–14, in conversation with Sir Nicholas Goodison at FHS 50th Anniversary Reception at Mansion House, 5 June 2014.
- Born: 16 May 1934; Watford, Hertfordshire, England
- Died: 6 July 2021 (aged 87)
- Education: Marlborough School; King's College, Cambridge
- Occupation: Businessman
- Known for: Previous Chairman of the London Stock Exchange

Sir Nicholas Proctor Goodison (16 May 1934 – 6 July 2021) was a British businessman who was chairman of the London Stock Exchange from 1976 to 1986. He was an important supporter of the arts and the President of the Furniture History Society (FHS).

== Career ==
Goodison was born in Watford, the son of Edmund Harold Goodison and Eileen Mary Carrington Proctor. He was educated at Marlborough College and then King's College, Cambridge, of which he was an honorary fellow. He was made a Knight Bachelor in the 1982 New Year Honours.

He served as chairman of the Courtauld Institute of Art from 1982 to 2002 and of the National Art Collections Fund (now The Art Fund) from 1986 to 2002.

He appeared as a castaway on the BBC Radio programme Desert Island Discs on 1 March 1987.

== Artistic legacy ==
The National Portrait Gallery, London holds two portraits of Goodison in its collection, a bust by Ivor Roberts-Jones and a photograph by Lucy Anne Dickens. His portrait in oil, by Tom Phillips, is in the Stock Exchange's collection. A preparatory sketch made in oil on panel in 2006 was acquired from the artist by the Art Fund and is in the Courtauld Gallery.

== Personal life ==
Sir Nicholas married Judith Abel Smith (b. 21 January 1939) on 18 June 1960: they had a son, Adam, and two daughters, Katharine and Rachel.

He died on 6 July 2021, at the age of 87.

== Publications ==
- Goodison, N., & Hardy, J. (1970). Gillows at Tatton Park. Furniture History, 6, 1-39.
- Gillows Clock Cases (Antiquarian Horological Society, 1968)
- English Barometers 1680-1860: A History of Domestic Barometers and their Makers and Retailers (Cassell & Co., 1968); revised & reprinted (Antique Collectors' Club, 1977 & 1992)
- Ormolu: The Work of Matthew Boulton (Phaidon, 1974); revised & reprinted as Matthew Boulton: Ormolu (Christie's, 2002)
- A New Era for Museums? The First Annual A. W. Franks Lecture, 1997 (The British Museum, 1997) co-authored with Dr. Lindsay Boynton
- Furniture History: Forty Years On (Furniture History Society, 2004)
- Hotspur: Eighty Years of Antiques Dealing (Two Associates, 2004) co-authored with Robin Kern
- These Fragments (Elliott & Thompson, 2005)
- Matthew Boulton's Trafalgar Medal (Birmingham Museums & Art Gallery, 2007)
