= George Moffatt (English politician) =

British politician

George Moffatt (11 May 1806 – 20 February 1878) was a British Liberal Party politician.

He was the son of William And Alice Moffatt.

== Political career ==
He unsuccessfully attempted to enter the Commons at a by-election in Ipswich in 1842. He was Member of Parliament (MP) for Dartmouth 1845–52, Ashburton 1852–59, Honiton 1860–65, and Southampton 1865–68. He subsequently contested the 1870 Isle of Wight by-election, losing by 35 votes. He was also the owner of Goodrich Court, a neo-gothic castle in Herefordshire.

== Marriage and family ==
In 1856, he married Lucy Morrison (1825-1876), daughter of MP James Morrison They had four children:

- Alice Lucy Moffatt (1858-1922
- Harold Charles Moffatt (1859-1945)
- Ethel Gwendoline Moffatt (1861-1952), Wife of MP Howard Vincent
- Hilda Eva Moffatt (1862-1947); married in 1884 Colonel Hon. George Hugh Gough (1852–1900), a British Army officer and younger son of George Gough, 2nd Viscount Gough.

Parliament of the United Kingdom
Preceded by Joseph Somes	Member of Parliament for Dartmouth; 1845–1852	Succeeded by Sir Thomas Herbert
Preceded by Thomas Matheson	Member of Parliament for Ashburton; 1852–1859	Succeeded by John Harvey Astell
Preceded by Alexander Baillie-Cochrane and Joseph Locke	Member of Parliament for Honiton; 1860–1865; With: Alexander Baillie-Cochrane	Succeeded by Alexander Baillie-Cochrane and Frederick Goldsmid
Preceded by William Digby Seymour and William Anderson Rose	Member of Parliament for Southampton; 1865–1868; With: Russell Gurney	Succeeded by Russell Gurney and Peter Merrick Hoare
