= John Hayward (MP for Bridport) =

English politician

John Hayward alias Seymour (c. 1355–1407), of Bridport, Dorset, was an English politician.

He was a Member (MP) of the Parliament of England for Bridport in 1373, October 1377, 1378, January 1380, February 1383, April 1384, November 1384, 1386, February 1388, January 1390, 1393, 1395, September 1397 and 1399.
