= Anne Spencer, Countess of Sunderland (died 1715) =

The Countess of Sunderland
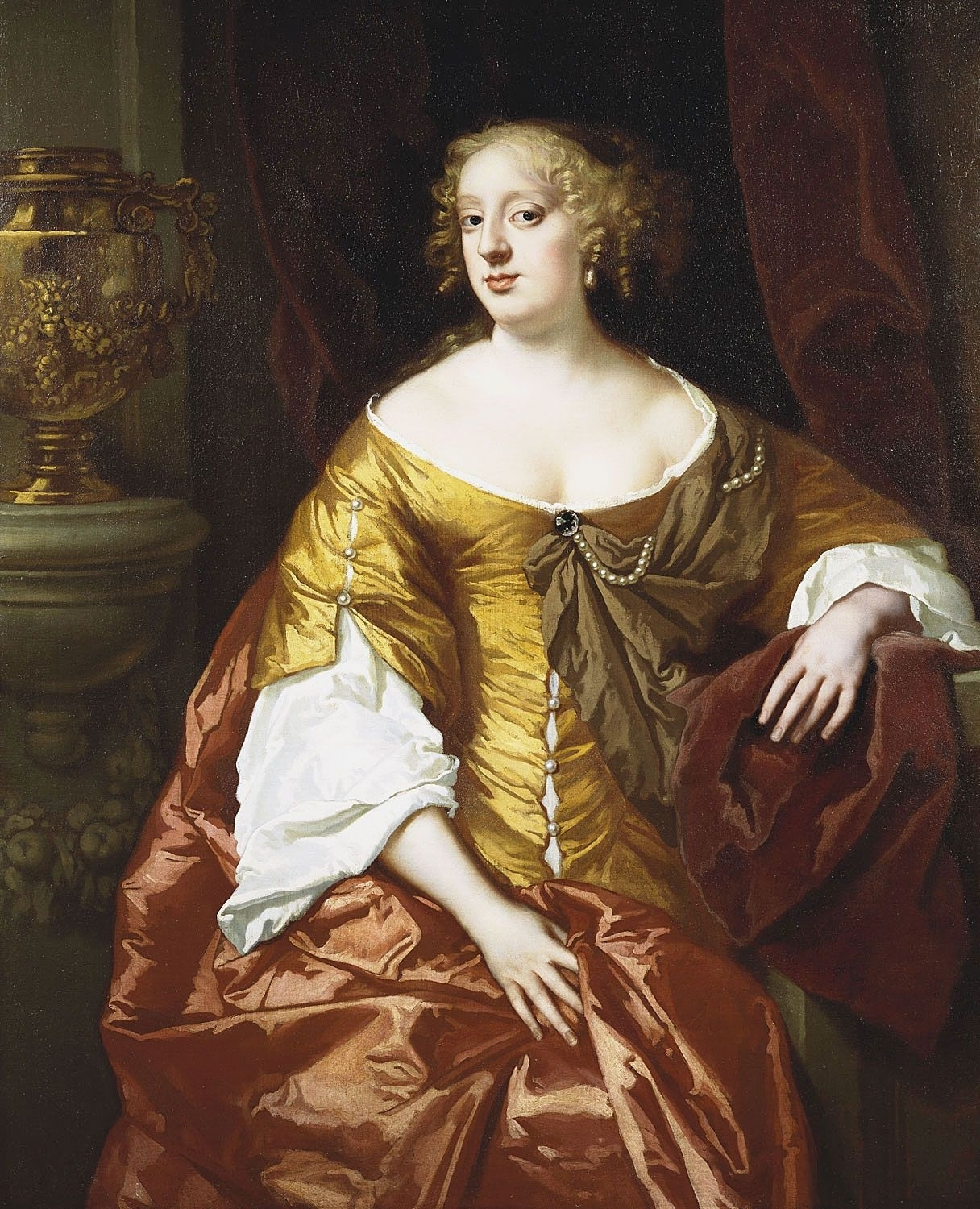
- Anne, Countess of Sunderland, by Sir Peter Lely, as one of the Windsor Beauties. Hampton Court Palace.
- Born: 1646
- Died: 26 April 1715 (aged 68–69)
- Spouse: Robert Spencer, 2nd Earl of Sunderland
- Issue: 4, including Charles
- Father: George Digby, 2nd Earl of Bristol
- Mother: Anne Digby, Countess of Bristol

Anne Spencer, Countess of Sunderland (née Digby; c. 1646 – 26 April 1715) was the wife of Robert Spencer, 2nd Earl of Sunderland and the daughter of George Digby, 2nd Earl of Bristol and Lady Anne Russell.

== Biography ==
Anne was born in 1646, the daughter of George Digby, 2nd Earl of Bristol and his wife, Anne Russel, she married Robert Spencer, 2nd Earl of Sunderland on 10 June 1665. The groom had previously broken off their long-standing engagement; according to Samuel Pepys he told his friends that he had reason enough and was resolved never to have her. He soon had second thoughts and their mothers worked together to produce a reconciliation which resulted in an entirely successful marriage. She was a lady-in-waiting to Mary of Modena during the reign of James II, and was present at the birth of the Prince of Wales, signalling to the king that his new child was a boy.

She became a close friend of Sarah Churchill, later Duchess of Marlborough, and was disliked by Queen Anne, who was jealous of their friendship. Some have alleged that she had an affair with Henry Sydney, 1st Earl of Romney, her husband's uncle, but this is considered unlikely owing to her husband's obvious approval of their friendship. John Evelyn indeed spoke well of her, and she seems to have been a woman of good character. Her devotion to her husband was never seriously questioned; his biographer considered that it was principally his happy marriage which sustained Sunderland through a long and unhappy life.

== Family ==
She had at least five children by Sunderland, only one of whom outlived her:

- Lord Robert Spencer (1666–1688)
- Lady Anne Spencer (1667–1690), married James Hamilton, 4th Duke of Hamilton in 1687
- Lady Isabella (1668–1684)
- Lady Elizabeth Spencer (1671–1704), married Donough MacCarty, 4th Earl of Clancarty in 1684
- Charles Spencer, 3rd Earl of Sunderland (1674–1722), who married Arabella, daughter of Henry Cavendish, 2nd Duke of Newcastle in 1695, then Anne Churchill, second daughter of John Churchill, 1st Duke of Marlborough and Sarah Churchill in 1700.

From her own letters, it seems that she had two other children, who died young.

Like her husband, Lady Sunderland was a supporter of the Whig cause. The 1704 foundation stone of Sir John Vanbrugh's new theatre in Haymarket (later the Queen's Theatre and now replaced by Her Majesty's Theatre) was dedicated to her as "the little Whig".
