= Pandeli Ralli =

Greek-British politician (1845–1928)

Pandeli Toumazis Ralli JP DL (22 May 1845 – 22 August 1928) was a Greek-British politician.

Ralli was born in Marseille, the son of Toumazis "Thomas" Stephanou Ralli of Ralli Brothers and his wife, Marie, daughter of Pandeli Argenti. The family established itself in Belgrave Square. Pandeli was educated in Middlesex and at King's College London. He graduated from Trinity College, Cambridge in 1866 with a Bachelor of Arts degree.

He was elected Liberal Member of Parliament for Bridport in 1875 and held the seat until 1880. He was elected Liberal Member of Parliament for Wallingford in 1880 and held the seat until the constituency was abolished in 1885. He held the offices of justice of the peace for Surrey, and deputy lieutenant of Dorset. He later stood unsuccessfully as a Liberal Unionist.

After a long illness, he died unmarried, aged 83, in Brighton, Sussex. His sister Ioanna married Sir Richard Reynolds-Moreton and was the mother of the Viscountess Byng of Vimy.

== Elections ==
1892 Newcastle-upon-Tyne by-election
Party	Candidate	Votes	%	±%
Liberal	John Morley	12,983		
Liberal Unionist	Pandeli Ralli	11,244		
Majority		1,739		
Turnout				
Liberal hold		Swing		

Parliament of the United Kingdom
Preceded by Thomas Alexander Mitchell	Member of Parliament for Bridport; 1875–1880	Succeeded by Charles Warton
Preceded by Walter Wren	Member of Parliament for Wallingford; 1880–1885	Constituency abolished
