= Alexander Pitfield =

English politician

Sir Alexander Pitfield (14 April 1659 – 19 October 1728) was an English Whig politician and historian. He was MP for Bridport from 1698 till 1708.

He was the second but only surviving son of Sir Charles Pitfield and his first wife Winifred, the daughter of John Adderley. He was educated privately and was educated at Merchant Taylors' from 1671 till 1674. He was matriculated at Sidney Sussex College, Cambridge in 1676 and entered Lincoln's Inn in 1676. On 20 April 1680, he married Elizabeth (d. after 1695), the daughter of Richard Waller and they had one son whom predeceased him and four daughters (two predeceased him). On 3 September 1703, he married Dorothy (died 1726), the daughter of Thomas Boone and the widow of Robert Boddington.

He was imprisoned in the early 1670s due to anti-government remarks during a land dispute with the Finsbury Archers. He regained royal favour in 1675 and was knighted in 1676.

In 1684, he became a Fellow of the Royal Society and published a translated natural history work.

He was elected MP for Bridport in 1698. In 1708, he did not stand for Parliament. He died on 19 October 1728 and was buried in Shoreditch.
