= Charles Cavendish, Viscount Mansfield =

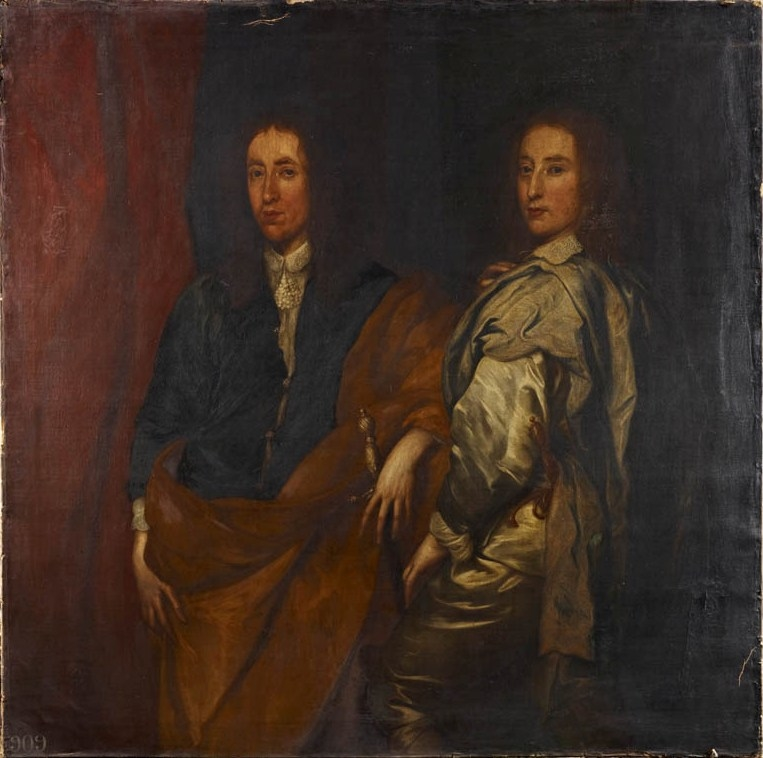
Cavendish (left) depicted alongside his younger brother, Henry

Charles Cavendish, Viscount Mansfield (c. 1626 – June 1659) was an English gentleman who sat in the House of Commons from 1640 to 1644. He supported the Royalist cause in the English Civil War.

Viscount Mansfield was the eldest son and heir of William Cavendish, 1st Earl of Newcastle-upon-Tyne, conferred upon him in 1628, and his first wife, Elizabeth Basset of Blore. From 1628, as a son and heir he was known by his father's second peerage, Viscount Mansfield, used as a courtesy title.

In November 1640, Mansfield was elected Member of Parliament for East Retford in the Long Parliament. He was disabled from sitting in 1644 and went into exile with his father, returning to England in 1659.

Mansfield married Elizabeth Rogers, a daughter of Richard Rogers and Anne Cheek. He died at the age of 32, while his father was still alive. His younger brother Henry succeeded their father as second duke of Newcastle, a title he was given after the Restoration of 1660.

Parliament of England
| Preceded by Sir Gervase Clifton, 1st Baronet; Francis Pierrepont | Member of Parliament for East Retford; 1640–1644; With: Sir Gervase Clifton, 1st Baronet | Succeeded by Francis Thornhaugh; Sir William Lister |
