= John Digby, 3rd Earl of Bristol =

English landowner and politician

The Right Honourable John Digby
- Earl of Bristol
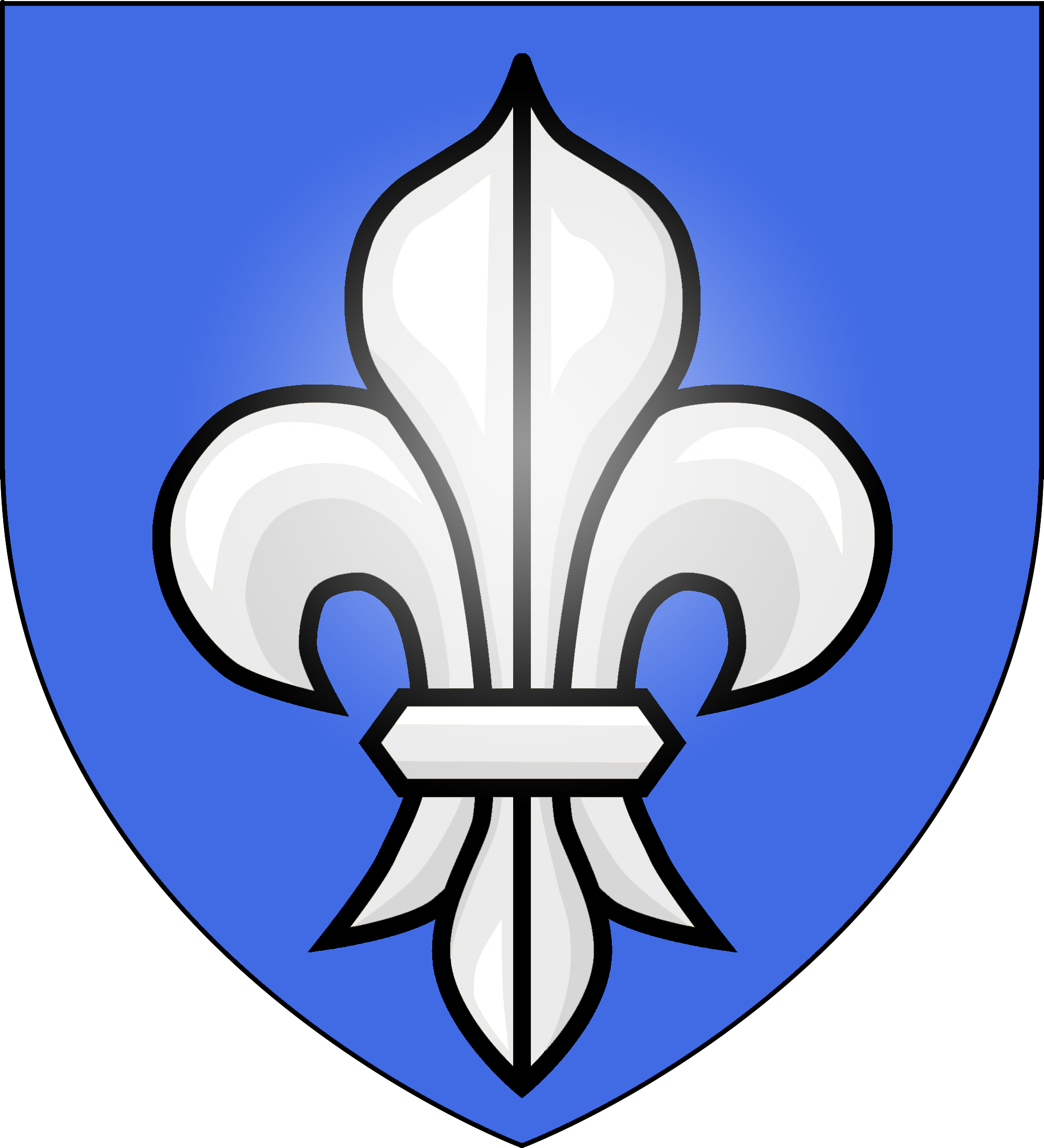
- Coat of arms
- Tenure: 1677–1698
- Predecessor: George Digby, 2nd Earl of Bristol
- Successor: Extinct
- Born: 1634
- Died: 18 September 1698 (aged 63–64)
- Buried: Sherborne Abbey
- Spouses: Alice Bourne (m. 1656; died 1658) Rachel Wyndham (m. 1663)
- Father: George Digby, 2nd Earl of Bristol
- Mother: Lady Anne Russell

John Digby, 3rd Earl of Bristol (1634 – 18 September 1698) was an English landowner and politician who sat in the House of Commons from 1675 to 1677 when he inherited the peerage as Earl of Bristol. He was styled Lord Digby from 1653 to 1677.

== Life ==
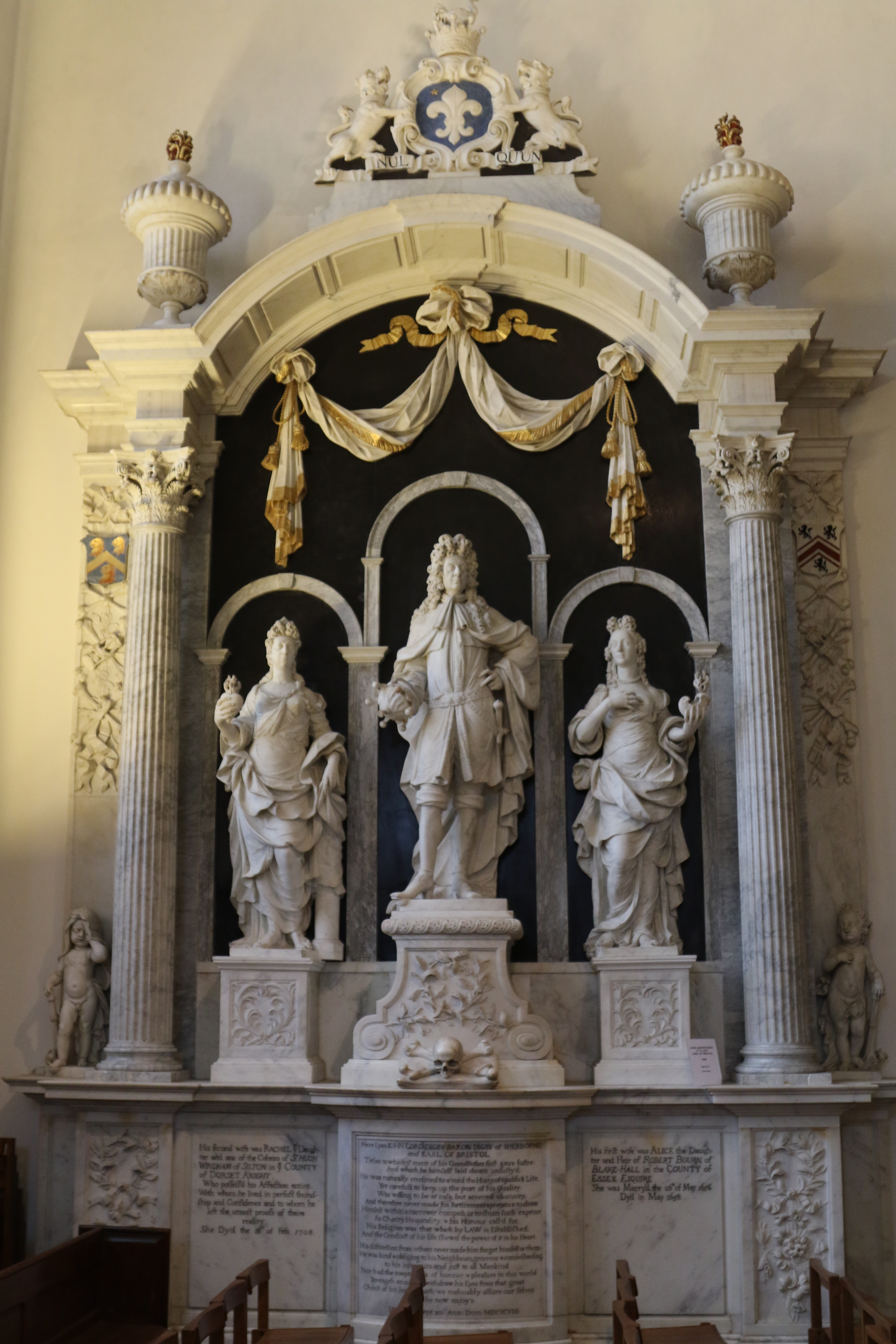
Memorial in Sherborne Abbey

Digby was the eldest son of George Digby, 2nd Earl of Bristol and his wife Lady Anne Russell, daughter of Francis Russell, 4th Earl of Bedford. He was baptised on 26 April 1634. He was educated privately. In July 1660 he became J.P. for Dorset and Somerset and commissioner for oyer and terminer on the Western circuit. He was commissioner for sewers for Somerset from December 1660 and commissioner for assessment for Dorset from 1661 to 1674. He was commissioner for assessment for Somerset from 1664 to 1674. From 1672 to 1674 he was Deputy Lieutenant for Dorset. In 1676 he was elected Member of Parliament for Dorset in a by-election to the Cavalier Parliament. In 1677, he inherited the Earldom of Bristol on the death of his father on 24 March and became a member of the House of Lords. He was Lord Lieutenant of Dorset from 1679 and Custos Rotulorum of Dorset from 1680. In 1683 he became freeman of Lyme Regis. In June 1688 he was deprived of his positions as JP, Lord Lieutenant and Custos, but was re-instated a few months later.

Digby died at the age of about 64, and was buried at Sherborne Abbey.

== Family ==
Digby married firstly on 26 March 1656, Alice Bourne daughter of Robert Bourne of Blake Hall, Essex. She died in 1658 and he married secondly by licence dated 13 July 1663, Rachel Wyndham, daughter of Sir Hugh Wyndham of Silton, Dorset, a Judge of the Common Pleas and Baron of the Exchequer. He had no issue by either wife and the title became extinct on his death.

Parliament of England
Preceded by Giles Strangways; John Strode	Member of Parliament for Dorset; 1675–1677; With: John Strode	Succeeded by John Strode; Thomas Browne
Honorary titles
Preceded by The Lord Poulett	Lord Lieutenant of Dorset; 1679–1698	Succeeded by The Duke of Bolton
Preceded by The Lord Holles	Custos Rotulorum of Dorset; 1680–1698	Succeeded by The Duke of Bolton
Peerage of England
Preceded by George Digby	Earl of Bristol; 1677–1698	Extinct
