= John Strode (died 1581) =

16th-century English politician

- Arms of Strode of Parnham in Dorset: Ermine, on a canton sable a crescent argent
- Born: 1524
- Died: 2 September 1581 (aged 56–57)
- Occupation: Politician
- Years active: 1572–1573
- Spouses: Katherine Cromwell; Margaret Hadley (m. 1572)
- Children: with Katherine: Robert Strode; Edward Strode; Sir John Strode; Thomas Strode; George Strode; Margaret Strode; with Margaret: Hugh Strode; Margaret Strode; Anne Strode; Dorothy Strode; Bridget Strode; Alice Strode
- Parents: Robert Strode; Elizabeth Hody

John Strode (1524 – 2 September 1581), was elected MP for Dorset in 1572 and was Sheriff of Dorset from 1572 to 1573.

== Life ==
Born in 1524, John Strode was the eldest son of Robert Strode (d. 1559) of Parnham, Dorset and Elizabeth, daughter of Reginald Hody.

He served as captain of musters by 1560, commissioner of concealed lands and Sheriff of Dorset from 1572 to 1573 and Justice of the Peace from about 1575.

In his later years he investigated taverns and grain supplies at Lyme Regis; entertained the 2nd Earl of Bedford at Bridport; stayed at Marshwood with Sir Amias Paulet, the lord of the manor; investigated horse theft; and, in 1578, investigated at the request of the Privy Council the causes of the dispute between Sir Henry Ashley and Henry Howard, son of Thomas Howard, 1st Viscount Howard of Bindon. The Privy Council praised him for his "great travail" in 1580, when he and others had been examining the recusant, Lady Tregonwell, the widow of Sir John Tregonwell (d. 1565).

He died 2 September 1581, leaving £1,400 to his children, and appointing Henry Coker overseer. His eldest son Robert, then aged about 22, was executor and residuary legatee.

== Marriages and issue ==
Strode married twice. He married firstly, Katherine, daughter of Gregory Cromwell, 1st Baron Cromwell and Elizabeth Seymour, by whom he had six children:

- Robert Strode (1559 – )
- Edward Strode
- Sir John Strode
- Thomas Strode
- George Strode
- Margaret Strode

He married secondly, on 28 January 1572, Margaret, daughter of Christopher (or Christian) Hadley of Withycombe, Somerset and widow of Thomas Luttrell by whom he had one son and five daughters:

- Hugh Strode
- Margaret Strode
- Anne Strode
- Dorothy Strode
- Bridget Strode
- Alice Strode

== Notes ==
Parliament of England
| Preceded by John Horsey; William Paulet | Member of Parliament for Dorset; 1572–1581; With: Richard Rogers | Succeeded by George Trenchard; John Fitzjames |
