= John Every =

English landowner and politician (1643–1679)

John Every (c 1643 - 1679) was an English landowner and politician who sat in the House of Commons in 1679.

Every was the son of John Every of Symondsbury, Dorset and his wife Anne Williams, daughter of George Williams of Wootton Glanville. He succeeded his father in 1658 and his cousin William Every of Cothays in about 1660. He matriculated at Wadham College, Oxford on 16 July 1661, aged 17 and was awarded MA on 28 September 1663.

He was commissioner for assessment for Dorset from 1664 to 1669 and was made a freeman of Lyme Regis in 1666. From 1676 to 1677 he was Sheriff of Dorset when he had to deal with several disputed elections. He was J.P. for Dorset from 1677 and for Somerser from 1678. He was commissioner for assessment for Somerset in 1679. He was a member of the Green Ribbon Club and in 1679, he was elected Member of Parliament for Bridport in the First Exclusion Parliament.

Every died at the age of about 36 after the session of parliament ended on 8 July 1679 and was buried at Wootton Glanville. He had married, in 1666, Elizabeth Trenchard, daughter of Thomas Trenchard of Wolveton, Dorset.

Parliament of England
Preceded by George Bowerman; Wadham Strangways	Member of Parliament for Bridport; 1679; With: Wadham Strangways	Succeeded by Sir Robert Henley, 2nd Baronet; William Bragge
