= John Roger (died 1441) =

English Member of Parliament

John Roger of Bridport and Bryanston, Dorset, was an English Member of Parliament for Bridport in 1395, 1410 and May 1413 and for Dorset in December 1421. He died later in 1441.
