= George Digby, 2nd Earl of Bristol =

English politician (1612–1677)

The Right Honourable The Earl of Bristol
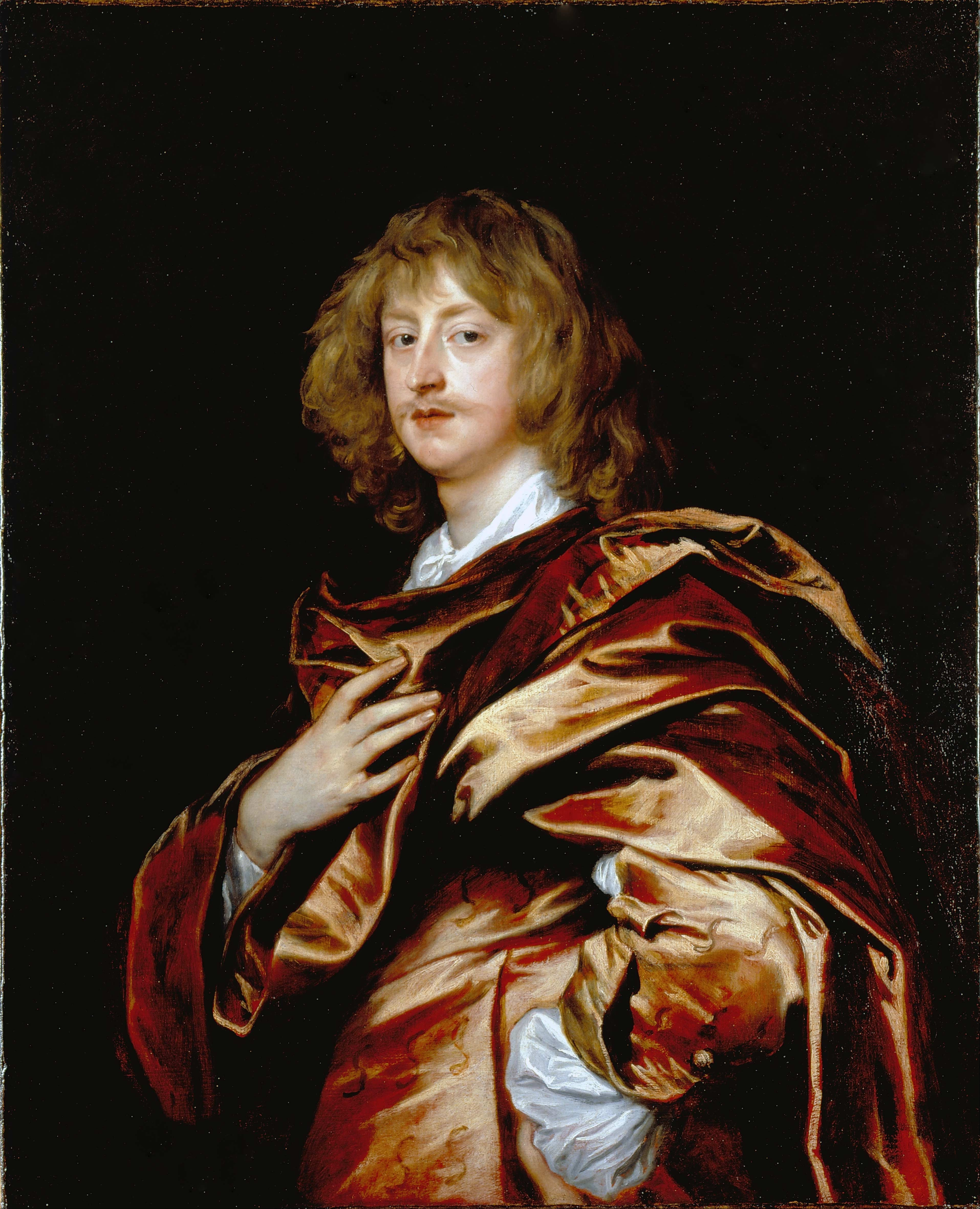
- Portrait of George Digby, 2nd Earl of Bristol, by Sir Anthony van Dyck, c. 1638
- Born: 5 November 1612; Madrid, Spain
- Died: 20 March 1677 (aged 64); Kingdom of England
- Children: 4, including John and Anne
- Relatives: John Digby, 1st Earl of Bristol (father)
- Military career
- Allegiance: Kingdom of England
- Conflicts: English Civil War
- Other work: Secretary of State, Privy Councillor, Master of the Horse

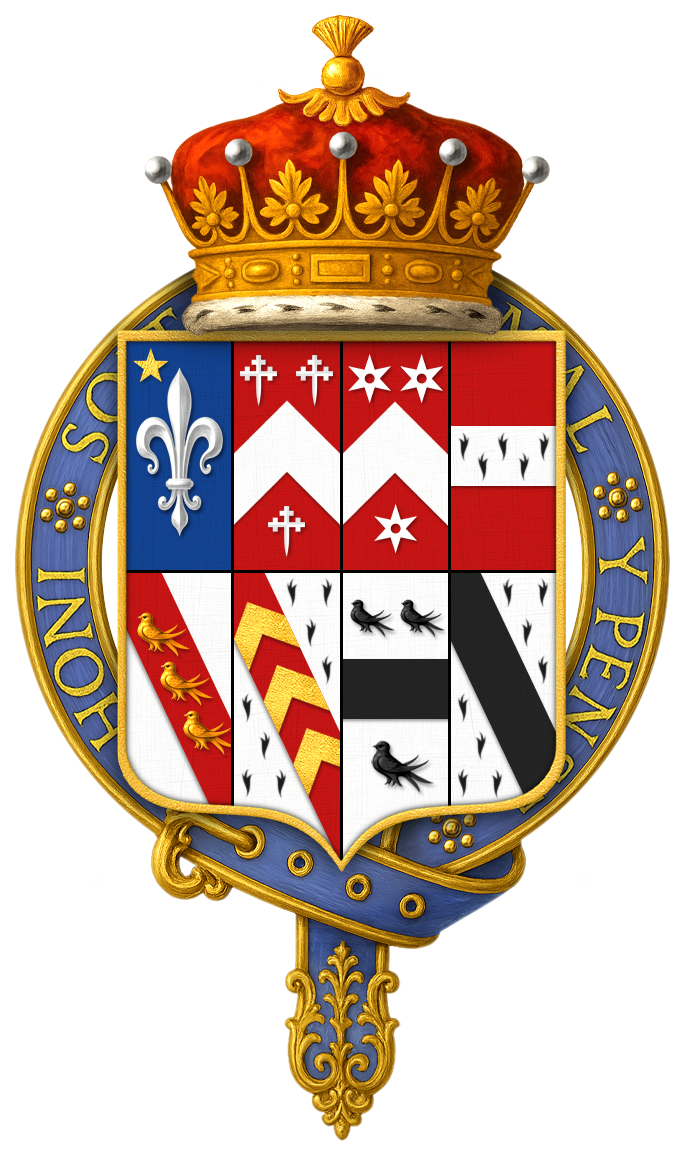
Quartered arms of George Digby, 2nd Earl of Bristol, KG

George Digby, 2nd Earl of Bristol (5 November 1612 – 20 March 1677) was an English politician and peer who sat in the House of Commons from 1640 until 1641, when he was raised to the House of Lords by a writ of acceleration. He supported the Royalists during the English Civil War, but his ambition and instability of character caused serious problems to himself and both Kings he served.

== Early life ==
Digby was baptized in Madrid, the eldest known son of John Digby, 1st Earl of Bristol, who for many years was the English Ambassador to Spain, and his wife Beatrice Walcott. He is presumed to have been born there shortly before. At the age of twelve, he appeared at the bar of the House of Commons and pleaded for his father who was then imprisoned in the Tower of London. His youth, graceful person and well-delivered speech made a great impression. He was admitted to Magdalen College, Oxford, on 15 August 1626, where he was a favourite pupil of Peter Heylin. He spent the following years in study and in travel, from which he returned, according to George Villiers, 4th Earl of Clarendon, "the most accomplished person of our nation or perhaps any other nation, and distinguished by a remarkably handsome person". In June 1634 Digby was committed to the Fleet Prison till July for striking Crofts, a gentleman of the court, in Spring Gardens, and possibly his severe treatment and the disfavour shown to his father were the causes of his hostility to the court. He became MA in 1636. In 1638 and 1639 were written the Letters between Lord George Digby and Sir Kenelm Digby, Knt. concerning Religion (published in 1651), in which Digby attacked Roman Catholicism.

== Politics and the Civil War ==
In April 1640, Digby was elected member of parliament for Dorset in the Short Parliament. He was re-elected MP for Dorset for the Long Parliament in November 1640. In conjunction with John Pym and John Hampden he took an active part in the opposition to Charles I of England. He moved on 9 November for a committee to consider the deplorable state of the kingdom, and on 11 November was included in the committee for the impeachment of Thomas Wentworth, 1st Earl of Strafford, against whom he at first showed great zeal. However, after the failure of the impeachment, he opposed the attainder of Strafford, and made an eloquent speech on 21 April 1641, accentuating the weakness of Henry Vane's evidence against the prisoner, and showing the injustice of ex post facto legislation, in condemning a man for acts which were not treason when they were committed. He was regarded in consequence with great hostility by the parliamentary party, and was accused of having stolen from Pym's table Vane's notes on which the prosecution mainly depended. On 15 July his speech was burnt by the public hangman by the order of the House of Commons.

On 8 February he made an important speech in the Commons advocating the reformation and opposing the abolition of episcopacy. On 8 June, during the angry discussion on the army plot, he narrowly escaped assault in the House, and the following day, in order to save him from further attacks, Charles I of England called him up to the House of Lords by writ of acceleration in his father's Barony of Digby.

King Charles mistakenly followed Digby's advice in preference to such men as Edward Hyde, 1st Earl of Clarendon and Lucius Cary, 2nd Viscount Falkland. In November 1641 Digby was recorded as performing "singular good service", and "doing beyond admiration", in speaking in the Lords against the instruction concerning evil counsellors. He suggested to Charles the impeachment of the five members, and urged upon him the fatal attempt to arrest them on 4 January 1642. He failed to play his part in the Lords in securing the arrest of Lord Mandeville, to whom on the contrary he declared that the king was very mischievously advised, and according to Edward Hyde, 1st Earl of Clarendon his imprudence was responsible for the betrayal of the king's plan. On the next day, Digby advised the attempt to seize the five members in the city by force.

In the same month Digby was ordered to appear in the Lords to answer a charge of high treason for a supposed armed attempt at Hull, but fled to the Dutch Republic, where he joined Queen consort Henrietta Maria of France, and on 26 February was impeached.

Subsequently, he visited Charles at York disguised as a Frenchman, but on the return voyage to the Dutch Republic, he was captured and taken to Hull. For some time he escaped detection, but at last, after revealing his identity, he cajoled Sir John Hotham into letting him escape. Later on a second visit to Hull, he tried unsuccessfully to persuade Hotham to surrender York to the King. He was present at the Battle of Edgehill, and was wounded while leading the assault at Lichfield. After a quarrel with Prince Rupert of the Rhine, he threw down his commission and returned to the King at Oxford, over whom he obtained more influence as the prospect became more gloomy.

On 28 September 1643 he was appointed secretary of state and a privy councillor, and on 31 October high steward of Oxford University. He now supported Henrietta Maria's policy of foreign alliances and use of help from Ireland, and took part in several imprudent and ill-conducted negotiations which damaged the king's affairs. His fierce disputes with Prince Rupert and his party caused further embarrassment.

On 14 October 1645, he was made lieutenant general of the royal forces north of the River Trent. The intention was to push through to join James Graham, 1st Marquess of Montrose, but he was defeated on 15 October at Sherburn, where his correspondence was captured. This correspondence revealed the king's expectations from abroad and from Ireland and his intrigues with the Scots. Digby reached Dumfries, but finding his way barred, escaped on 24 October to the Isle of Man. He then crossed to Ireland, where he caused Edward Somerset, 2nd Marquess of Worcester, who had been sent to negotiate with the Irish Confederacy, to be arrested. In Ireland, he believed he was going to achieve wonders. "Have I not carried my body swimmingly," he wrote to Hyde in irrepressible good spirits, "who being before so irreconcilably hated by the Puritan party, have thus seasonably made myself as odious to the Papists?"

== Exile ==
Digby's plan was to bring over Charles, Prince of Wales, to head a royalist movement on the island. When he joined Charles at Jersey in April 1646, he intended to entrap him on board, but was dissuaded by Hyde. Digby then travelled to Paris to gain Henrietta Maria of France's consent to his scheme, but returned to persuade Charles to go to Paris, and accompanied him thither. He revisited Ireland on 29 June once more, and on the surrender of the island to Parliament escaped again to France.

At Paris, amongst the Royalists, he found himself in a nest of enemies eager to pay off old scores. Prince Rupert challenged him, and he fought a duel with Lord Wilmot. He continued his adventures by serving in Louis XIV of France's troops in the war of the Fronde, in which he greatly distinguished himself. He was appointed in 1651 lieutenant-general in the French army, and commander of the forces in Flanders. These new honours, however, were soon lost.

During Cardinal Mazarin's enforced absence from the court Digby aspired to become his successor. However, when the Cardinal was restored to power, he sent Digby away on an expedition in Italy, having penetrated his character and regarded him as a mere adventurer. When Digby returned to France he was told that he was included in the list of those expelled from France, in accordance with the new treaty with Oliver Cromwell.

In August 1656 he joined Charles II at Bruges, and wanting revenge on the cardinal, offered his services to John of Austria the Younger in the Southern Netherlands. He was instrumental in effecting the surrender of the garrison of Saint-Ghislain to Spain in 1657. On 1 January 1657, he was appointed by Charles II secretary of state, but shortly afterwards, he was compelled to resign office as he had become a Roman Catholic — probably with the view of adapting himself better to his new Spanish friends. Charles took him with him to Spain in 1659 on account of his "jollity " and Spanish experience.

Although unwelcome to the Spanish, he succeeded in ingratiating himself, and was later welcomed by Philip IV of Spain at Madrid. Digby succeeded to the peerage as 2nd Earl of Bristol on the death of his father in January 1653 and was made KG the same month.

== Restoration ==
As Lord Bristol, he returned to the Kingdom of England at the English Restoration, when he found himself excluded from office on account of his religion, and relegated to only secondary importance. He tried to make an impression through restless and ambitious activity in parliament and he was violently hostile to Clarendon. In foreign affairs, he inclined strongly to the side of Spain, and opposed the king's marriage with Catherine of Braganza. He persuaded Charles to despatch him to Italy to view the Medici princesses, but the royal marriage and treaty with Portugal were settled in his absence.

In June 1663 Bristol tried to upset Clarendon's management of the House of Commons, but his intrigue was exposed to the parliament by Charles, and he had to attend the House of Lords to exonerate himself. When he confessed that he had "taken the liberty of enlarging", his "comedian-like" speech excited general amusement. In July, he broke out into fierce and disrespectful reproaches to the King, ending with a threat that unless Charles granted his requests within twenty-four hours "he would do somewhat that should awaken him out of his slumbers, and make him look better to his own business". Accordingly, on 10 July he impeached Clarendon in the Lords of high treason. When the charge was dismissed he renewed his accusation, was expelled from the court, and only avoided the warrant issued for his apprehension by hiding for two years.

In January 1664 Bristol appeared at his house at Wimbledon, and publicly renounced before witnesses his Roman Catholicism and declared himself a Protestant. His motive was probably to secure immunity from the charge of recusancy preferred against him. When, however, the fall of Clarendon was desired, Bristol was again welcomed at court. He took his seat in the Lords on 29 July 1667. "The king," wrote Samuel Pepys in November, "who not long ago did say of Bristol that he was a man able in three years to get himself a fortune in any kingdom in the world and lose all again in three months, do now hug him and commend his parts everywhere above all the world." He pressed eagerly for Clarendon's committal, and on the refusal of the Lords accused them of mutiny and rebellion, and entered his dissent with "great fury".

In March 1668, Bristol attended prayers in the Lords. On 15 March 1673 though still ostensibly a Roman Catholic, he spoke in favour of the Test Act, describing himself as "a Catholic of the Church of Rome, not a Catholic of the Court of Rome", and asserting the unfitness of Romanists for public office. In 1674, he acquired Buckingham House (later Beaufort House) in Chelsea. His adventurous and erratic career was closed by his death on 20 March 1677.

== Character ==
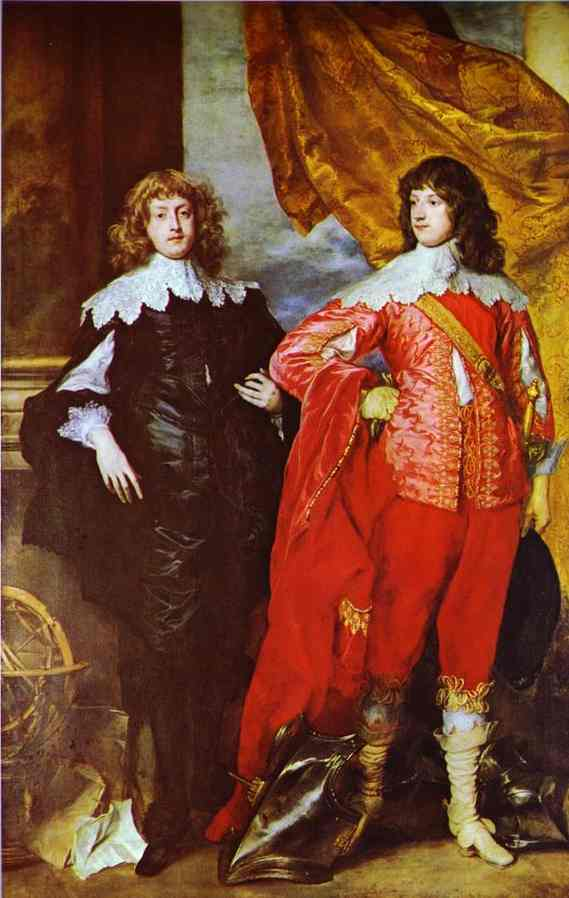
Portrait of George Digby in 1637 with William Russell, 1st Duke of Bedford, by Sir Anthony van Dyck. Althorp, Northamptonshire.

Clarendon describes him as "the only man I ever knew of such incomparable parts that was none the wiser for any experience or misfortune that befell him", and records his extraordinary facility in making friends and making enemies. Horace Walpole characterized him in a series of his smartest antitheses as "a singular person whose life was one contradiction". "He wrote against popery and embraced it; he was a zealous opposer of the court and a sacrifice for it; was conscientiously converted in the midst of his prosecution of Lord Strafford and was most unconscientiously a persecutor of Lord Clarendon. With great parts, he always hurt himself and his friends; with romantic bravery, he was always an unsuccessful commander. He spoke for the Test Act, though a Roman Catholic; and addicted himself to astrology on the birthday of true philosophy." Samuel Pepys in 1668 records in the great Diary an outburst against Bristol from an elderly Cavalier, Mr Ball: "I said at the King's coming back that the nation could never be safe while that man was alive".

Besides his youthful correspondence with Sir Kenelm Digby on the subject of religion, already mentioned, he was the author of an Apology (1643) [Thomason Tracts, E. 34 (32)], justifying his support of the king's cause; of a comedy, Elvira (1667) [Printed in R. Dodsley's Select Collection of Old English Plays (Hazlitt, 1876), vol. xv], and of Worse and Worse, an adaptation from the Spanish, acted but not printed. Other writings are also ascribed to him, including the authorship with Sir Samuel Tuke of The Adventures of Five Hours (1663). His eloquent and pointed speeches, many of which were printed, are included in the article in the Biog. Brit. and among the Thomason Tracts; see also the general catalogue in the British Museum. The catalogue of his library was published in 1680.

== Family ==
Bristol married Lady Anne Russell, a daughter of Francis Russell, 4th Earl of Bedford and his wife Catherine Brydges. She died in 1697. They were parents to four children:

- John Digby, 3rd Earl of Bristol (c. 1635 – 18 September 1698). He married twice, firstly Alice Bourne and secondly Rachel Wyndham, but died without issue, and the peerage became extinct.
- Francis Digby (d. 1672), died unmarried.
- Diana Digby, who married in 1658 Rene de Mol, Baron de Herent (died 1691), a nobleman of Flanders and had issue, including Jean-Baptiste, Baron de Herent, who was later styled "Comte de Bristole". Like her father, she was a convert to Catholicism.
- Anne Digby (d. 26 April 1715), who married Robert Spencer, 2nd Earl of Sunderland. From her descended Sarah Ferguson (b. 1959) and Diana, Princess of Wales (1961–1997).

Parliament of England
Vacant Parliament suspended since 1629	Member of Parliament for Dorset; 1640–1641; With: Richard Rogers 1640	Succeeded by John Browne; Richard Rogers
Political offices
Preceded by The Viscount Falkland; Sir Edward Nicholas	Secretary of State; 1643–1645; With: Sir Edward Nicholas	Succeeded by Sir Edward Nicholas
Peerage of England
Preceded by John Digby	Earl of Bristol; 1653–1676	Succeeded by John Digby
Preceded by John Digby	Baron Digby (writ in acceleration); 1641–1676	Succeeded by John Digby
