= Peter Battiscombe =

English politician

Member of Parliament for Bridport
- In office 22 December 1697 – 1700

Personal details
- Died: 1725

Peter Battiscombe (died 1725) was an English politician who was a member of parliament.
