= Hugh Hodges =

British politician

Hugh Hodges (1641 – 16 August 1693) MP JP was a lawyer and Member of Parliament for Bridport in the reign of James II.

== Family and Education ==
Hodges was educated at Sherborne, of which he became a governor in 1669 and later a benefactor to the library, Queen's College, Oxford and Lincoln's Inn. He was called to the Bar in 1666 and became a bencher of Lincoln's Inn in 1685.

He was joint auditor of excise for Dorset in 1662, commissioner for recusants in 1675, and commissioner for rebels’ estates in Somerset and Dorset in 1685 along with his fellow Old Shirburnian and MP Thomas Wyndham. He became Recorder of Dorchester in 1671, a JP from 1673 to 1688, Recorder of Bridport in 1677 and MP for Bridport in 1685.

== Family life ==
Hodges married Mary, daughter of John Eastmont of Sherborne, with whom he had one son who succeeded him. He died on 16 August 1693 and was buried in Sherborne Abbey, the only member of his family to sit in Parliament.
