= Thomas Scott (Bridport MP) =

English politician (1723–1816)

Thomas Scott (1723–1816) was an English politician who was Member of Parliament for Bridport from 1780 to 1790.
