= Francis Twiss =

English drama critic

Francis Twiss (bapt. 1759 – 1827) was an English drama critic, known as the compiler of a concordance to William Shakespeare.

== Life ==
He was the son of Francis Twiss, a merchant from Norwich, and was baptised in Rotterdam on 5 April 1759; Richard Twiss was his elder brother. He was admitted to Pembroke College, Cambridge in 1776, where he studied for a year.

In London during the early 1780s, Twiss took an interest in the stage, and wrote some criticism. He met John Philip Kemble, and took an interest in his sisters, marrying in the end Fanny. He also encountered Elizabeth Inchbald, giving her constructive help with her dramatic writing.

Twiss died at Cheltenham on 28 April 1827, aged 68.

== Works ==
Twiss published in two volumes in 1805, A complete verbal Index to the Plays of Shakspeare, adapted to all the editions, with a dedication to John Philip Kemble. It gives the word only not the longer passage in which it occurs, as later concordances did. Of 750 copies printed of it, 542 were destroyed by fire in 1807. Praised by James Boaden two decades later, it was in its time more convenient than the comparable work of Samuel Ayscough.

== Family ==
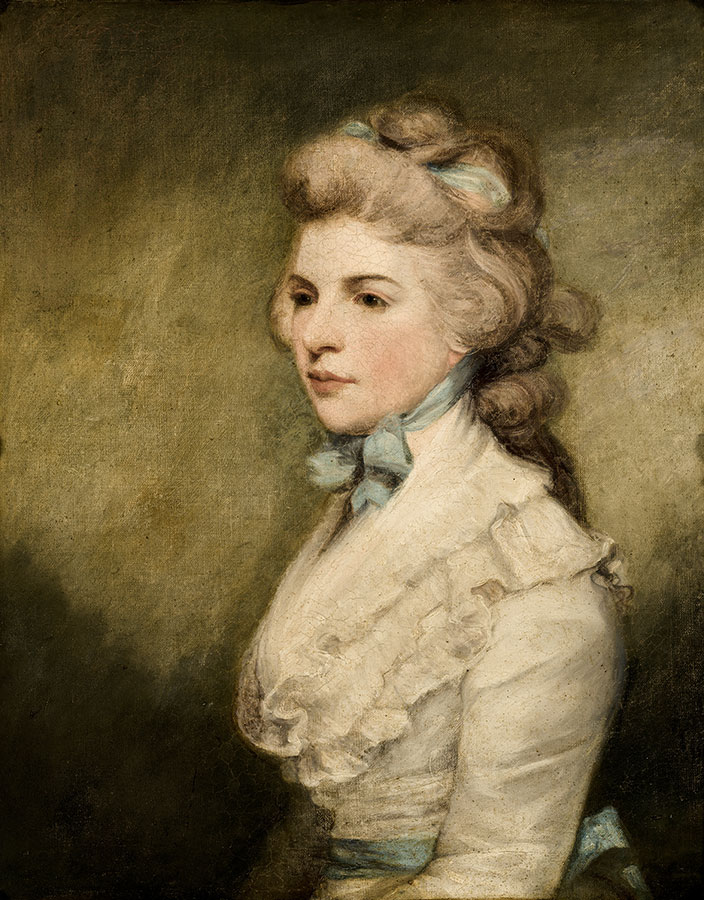
Frances Kemble, portrait c.1783 by Joshua Reynolds

Twiss married on 1 May 1786 Frances Kemble (1759–1822), known as Fanny. She was the second daughter of Roger Kemble, the sister of Sarah Siddons, and had been courted unsuccessfully by George Steevens. An actor though not very successful, on marriage she retired from the stage, which gladdened her sister. Later, from 1807 she kept a fashionable girls' school at 24 Camden Place, Bath, Somerset.

Fanny Twiss predeceased her husband, dying at Bath on 1 October 1822. Their eldest son was Horace Twiss; another son, John Twiss, became a major-general in the army in 1864, and was governor of the Royal Military Academy, Woolwich. There were four daughters of the marriage, one of whom died young.
