= William Muschamp =

English politician

William Muschamp (died 1660) was an English politician who sat in the House of Commons in 1624.

Muschamp was the son of Agmondesham Muschamp, of Guildford, Surrey. He matriculated from King's College, Cambridge at Easter 1605 and probably migrated to Balliol College, Oxford and was awarded BA in 1613. He was admitted at Middle Temple on 22 June 1613. In 1624, he was elected Member of Parliament for Bridport in the Happy Parliament.

Muschamp was of Rowbarnes, East Horsley, Surrey. He died in 1660 and was buried on 7 November.

Parliament of England
Preceded by John Strode; John Browne	Member of Parliament for Bridport; 1624; With: Robert Browne	Succeeded by Sir Lewis Dyve; Sir John Strode
