= Christopher Lambert (MP) =

English politician

Christopher Lambert, of Winchester, Hampshire, was an English politician.

He was the second son of William Lambert of Winchester and a servant of Sir William Paulet, 3rd Marquess of Winchester.

Lambert was a Member of Parliament for Bridport in 1593.
