= Christopher Spurrier =

British Member of Parliament (1783–1876)

Member of Parliament for Bridport
- In office 11 March 1820 – 20 June 1820

Personal details
- Born: 16 August 1783 Poole, Dorset
- Died: 13 November 1876 (aged 93) Chelmsford, Essex
- Party: Whig

Christopher Spurrier (16 August 1783 – 13 November 1876) was an English politician who was elected Member of Parliament for Bridport in the 1820 general election. He was also High Sheriff of Dorset from 1825 to 1826. Spurrier was born into one of Poole's leading Newfoundland merchant families and built Upton House.

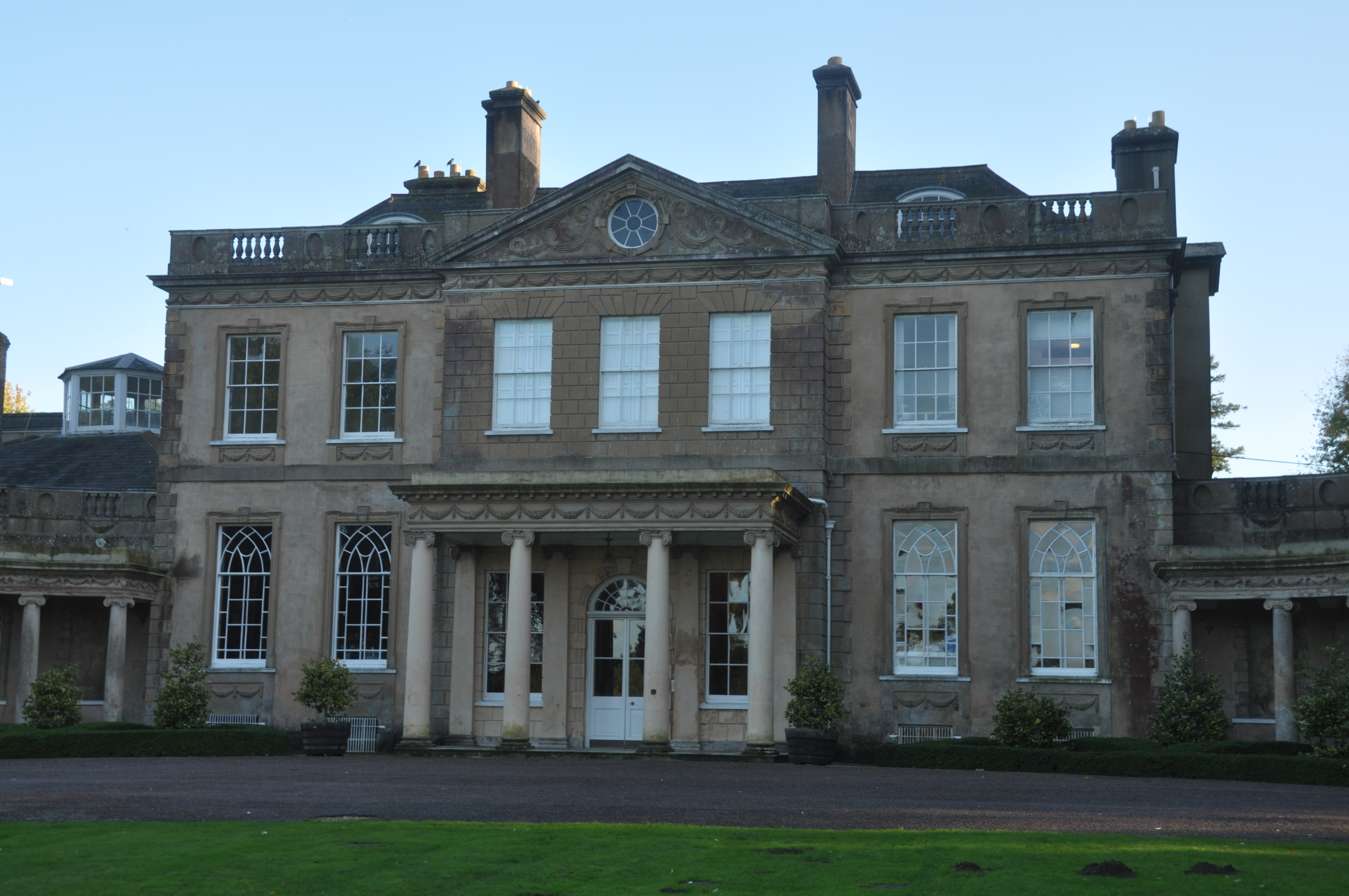
Upton House, Poole

== See also ==
- List of MPs elected in the 1820 United Kingdom general election
