= John Strode (died 1679) =

Colonel Sir John Strode JP DL
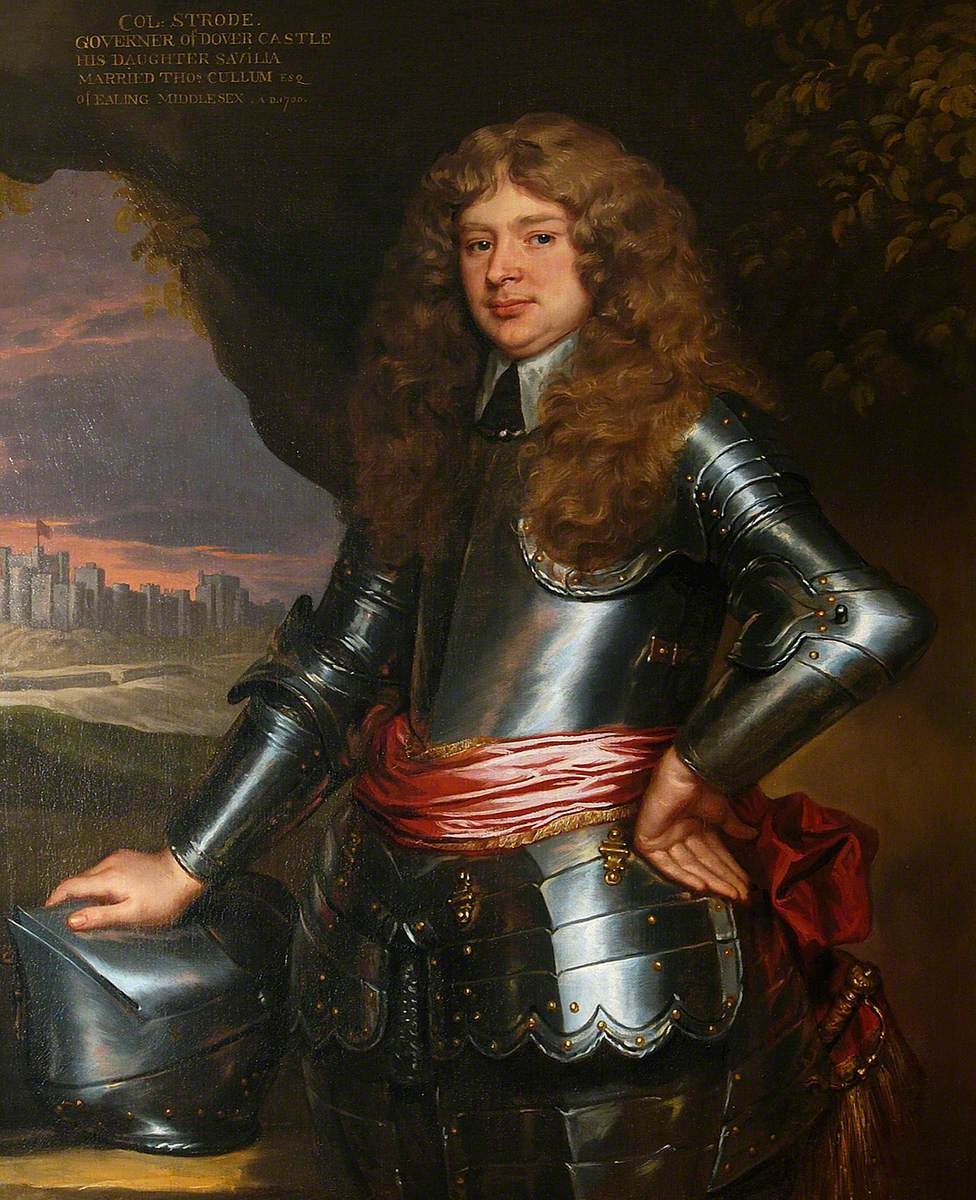
- Portrait by John Hayls, c.1679
- Born: 11 August 1624
- Died: 1679 (aged 54–55)
- Occupation: Politician
- Spouses: Anne Hewett (m. 1646) Anne Browne (m. 1669)
- Children: with Anne Hewett: William Strode; John Strode; Thomas Strode; George Strode; Robert Strode; Anne Strode; Margaret Strode; with Anne Browne: Hugh Strode; Browne Strode; Elizabeth Strode
- Parents: Sir John Strode; Ann Wyndham

Sir John Strode (11 August 1624 – 1679) of Parnham, Dorset supported the Royalist cause in the English Civil War. He held various official offices during the Protectorate and was knighted by Oliver Cromwell. After the Restoration he was a member of the Cavalier Parliament. He was knighted by King Charles II in 1662.

== Biography ==
Strode was the son of Sir John Strode, also a Royalist, MP for Bridport, and his second wife Ann Wyndham, who was killed in 1645 by Parliamentarian soldiers. He had a private education, succeeded his father in 1642 and was a royalist commissioner in the Civil War. He compounded for his estate valued at £633 p.a.

In 1652 he was commissioner for assessment and appointed J.P. for Dorset but he was removed again soon after. By 1657 he was commissioner for assessment again and served as Sheriff of Dorset from 1657 to November 1660. He was knighted by the Lord Protector Oliver Cromwell in 1658. He was commissioner for assessment from January 1660 to his death, became a freeman of Lyme Regis in May 1660 and was appointed J.P. for Dorset in July 1660 until his death. In 1661, he was elected Member of Parliament for Dorset in the Cavalier Parliament. He was knighted in April or May 1662. He became a freeman of Poole and commissioner for foreshore in Dorset in 1662. He was commissioner for corporations from 1662 to 1663 and was Deputy Lieutenant from 1663 to his death. In 1665 he was commissioner for pressing seamen and in 1675 was commissioner for recusants.

Strode died in 1679 at the age of about 55.

== Family ==
Strode married firstly on 13 December 1646, Anne Hewett, daughter of Sir William Hewett of Pishiobury, Sawbridgeworth, Hertfordshire and by her had six sons and two daughters:

- William Strode
- John Strode
- Thomas Strode
- George Strode
- Robert Strode
- Anne Strode
- Margaret Strode

He married secondly by licence dated 23 November 1669, Lady Anne Poulett, widow of John Poulett, 2nd Baron Poulett and daughter of Sir Thomas Browne, 2nd Baronet of Walcot. They had two sons and a daughter:

- Hugh Strode
- Browne Strode
- Elizabeth Strode married, 15 June 1699, Sir William Oglander 3rd Baronet, of Nunwell House on the Isle of Wight.

== Notes ==
Parliament of England
Preceded by John Fitzjames; Robert Coker	Member of Parliament for Dorset; 1661–1679; With: Giles Strangways; Lord Digby; Thomas Browne	Succeeded by Thomas Strangways; Thomas Freke
