= Furniture History Society =

UK charity

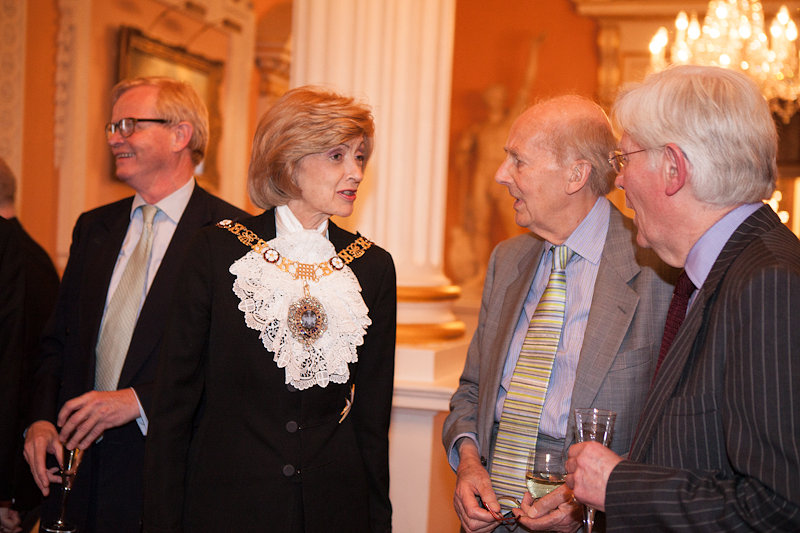
- Dame Fiona Woolf in conversation with Sir Nicholas Goodison at FHS 50th Anniversary at Mansion House, June 2014
- Formation: 1964
- Headquarters: Victoria & Albert Museum, London, England
- President: Christopher Rowell
- Website: www.furniturehistorysociety.org

The Furniture History Society (FHS), which was founded in 1964, is a membership society and registered charity in the United Kingdom.

== Background ==
The Furniture History Society is based in London, with close connections at the Victoria & Albert Museum. It was founded by a number of art and antique dealers. Since 1965, the society's annual journal Furniture History has published recent findings on British and continental European, Asian and American furniture. The Furniture History Society is governed by a council elected by its members, which is supported by specialist officers. Among its longtime leaders were Nicholas Goodison, in whose honour it published a Festschrift, and Christopher Gilbert.

In September 2016, the Furniture History Society created the British and Irish Furniture Makers Online (BIFMO) with the University of London's Institute of Historical Research (IHR). The initial phase of this database went online at the end of September 2017.

== See also ==
- Chippendale Society
- The Furniture Society
