= John Browne (Parliamentarian) =

English politician, born 1582

John Browne (1582 – 16 May 1659) was an English lawyer who sat in the House of Commons at various times between 1621 and 1653. He supported the Parliamentary cause in the English Civil War.

Browne was the son of John Browne of Frampton, Dorset. He matriculated at Magdalen College, Oxford, on 13 October 1598, aged 16. He was a student of the Middle Temple in 1599. In 1621, he was elected as a Member of Parliament for Bridport. He was re-elected as one of the members for Bridport in 1628, but his election was declared void on 12 April. In June 1641 he was elected for Dorset in the Long Parliament and sat until 1653, surviving Pride's Purge in 1648. He was appointed as a commissioner for the trial of the King in 1649, but did not act.

Browne died at the age of 78.

Parliament of England
Preceded by Sir William Bampfield; John Jeffrey	Member of Parliament for Bridport; 1621–1622; With: John Strode	Succeeded by William Muschamp; Robert Browne
Preceded by Sir John Strode; Sir Richard Strode	Member of Parliament for Bridport; 1628	Succeeded by Thomas Pawlet; Bampfield Chafin
Preceded by Lord Digby; Richard Rogers	Member of Parliament for Dorset; 1641–1653; With: Richard Rogers 1641–1642; Sir Thomas Trenchard 1645–1648	Succeeded by William Sydenham; John Bingham
