= Robert Browne (of Frampton) =

English politician

Robert Browne (28 February 1602 – 16 May 1634) was an English politician who sat in the House of Commons in 1624.

Browne was the son of Sir Robert Browne of Frampton, Dorset. In 1624, he was elected Member of Parliament for Bridport.

Parliament of England
Preceded by John Browne; Robert Strode	Member of Parliament for Bridport; 1624; With: William Muschamp	Succeeded by Sir Lewis Dyve; Sir John Strode
