= James Watson (Bridport MP) =

Member of Parliament for Bridport
- In office 1790–1795

Personal details
- Born: 1748
- Died: 2 May 1796 (aged 47 or 48)

James Watson (1748 – 2 May 1796) was an English politician who was Member of Parliament for Bridport from 1790 to 1795.
