= John Patrick Murrough =

British Radical politician

- Born: 2 December 1822; Chichester, West Sussex, England
- Died: 3 April 1901 (aged 78); Pulborough, Sussex, England
- Education: Royal Grammar School, Guildford
- Office: Member of Parliament
- Parent(s): John Murrough (father); Lucy Murrough (mother)

John Patrick Murrough (2 December 1822 – 3 April 1901) was a British Radical politician and landed proprietor who sat in the House of Commons from 1852 to 1857.

== Biography ==
He was born on 2 December 1822, the son of John Murrough, of Chichester, a merchant, by his wife Lucy, daughter of Edward Patrick, of Petersfield, Deputy Lieutenant and magistrate for Hampshire. He was educated at the Royal Grammar School, Guildford.

In 1848 he married Isabel Maria, daughter of John Beart.

He was admitted as a solicitor in 1844. He was Member of Parliament for Bridport from 1852 to 1857. He owned 162 acres of land.

He wrote a pamphlet on bankruptcy reform, and some letters to the Law Journal.

He lived at Watersfield Towers, Pulborough, Sussex, and his recreations included shooting, fishing, and the cultivation of shrubs and trees from foreign countries.
