= James Scott (Bridport MP) =

English politician

Member of Parliament for Bridport
- In office 11 March 1820 – 19 June 1826

Personal details
- Born: 1776 Rotherfield Park, Hampshire
- Died: February 1855 (aged 78)
- Party: Whig
- Children: James Winter Scott

James Scott (1776 – February 1855) was an English politician from the Whigs. He was elected Member of Parliament for Bridport in the 1820 general election.

== Personal life ==
His son James Winter Scott was Member of Parliament for North Hampshire from 1832 to 1837.

== See also ==
- List of MPs elected in the 1820 United Kingdom general election
