= Parnham =

Parnham is a place in Dorset, England.

- Parnham House

Parnham is also a surname and may refer to:

- Craig Parnham (born 1973), English field hockey player and coach
- Douglas Parnham (born 1951), British sprint canoer
- Rube Parnham (1894–1963), American baseball player

== See also ==
- Farnham (surname)
