= John Tracy (MP for Bridport) =

English Member of Parliament (fl.1384–1394)

John Tracy (fl. 1384–1394), of Bridport, was an English politician.

He was a member (MP) of the parliament of England for Bridport in April 1384, November 1384, 1385, 1386, February 1388, September 1388, January 1390, 1393 and 1394.
