= Swynfen Jervis =

British poet and Radical MP (1797–1867)

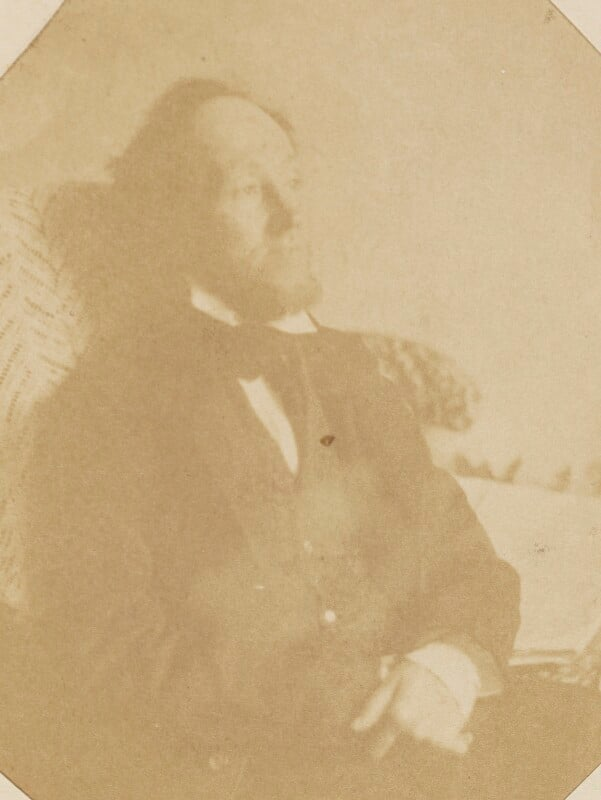
Jervis in the mid-1850s

Swynfen Stevens Jervis (10 May 1797 – 15 January 1867) was a British politician and writer, who represented Bridport in Parliament from 1837 to 1841.

Jervis was a member of a wealthy landowning family resident at Darlaston Hall in Staffordshire, and was educated at Christ Church, Oxford He was elected for Bridport at the 1837 general election as a Radical, and frequently rebelled against the Whig government. He strongly supported free trade in grain, opposed the government's Irish policy, and attacked the Church of England. He provoked further controversy by sending his correspondence with the whips in the newspapers. He stood down and did not contest the 1841 general election.

Jervis was an "eccentric" writer and intellectual, who was associated with Dante Rossetti and Christina Rossetti. He insisted on a high standard of education for his daughters, one of whom, Agnes (1822–1902) married the writer George Henry Lewes and later collaborated with him. His Dictionary of the Language of Shakespeare was under revision at the time of his death, and published the following year, edited by Alexander Dyce.

== Bibliography ==
- Jervis, Simon Swynfen, Swynfen Jervis MP, 1797−1867: Radical Landowner, Poetaster, Pteridologist and Shakespearian. Stafford: Staffordshire Record Society, 2020 ISBN 978-0-901719-16-4 OCLC 1231563032
- Jervis, Swynfen (Alexander Dyce, ed.), A Dictionary of the Language of Shakespeare. London: John Russell Smith, 1868
