= Dorset Regiment =

British infantry regiment

Dorsetshire Regiment Dorset Regiment
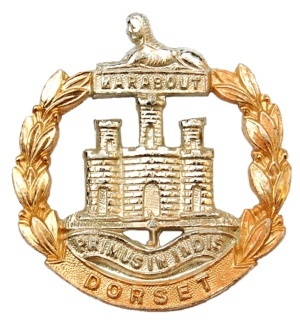
- Cap badge of the Dorset Regiment (1953–1958)
- Active: 1881–1958
- Country: United Kingdom
- Branch: British Army
- Type: Infantry
- Role: Line infantry
- Size: 2 Regular battalions 1 Militia/Special Reserve battalion 1 Volunteer/Territorial battalion Up to 6 Hostilities-only battalions
- Garrison/HQ: The Depot Barracks, Dorchester
- Nickname: The Dorsets
- Motto: Primus in Indis
- March: Quick: The Maid of Glenconnel
- Anniversaries: Plassey, 23 June

The Dorset Regiment was a line infantry regiment of the British Army in existence from 1881 to 1958, being the county regiment of Dorset. Until 1951, it was formally called the Dorsetshire Regiment, although usually known as "The Dorsets". In 1958, after service in the Second Boer War along with World War I and World War II, the Dorset Regiment was amalgamated with the Devonshire Regiment to form the Devonshire and Dorset Regiment. In 2007, it was amalgamated with the Royal Gloucestershire, Berkshire and Wiltshire Regiment, The Light Infantry and the Royal Green Jackets to form a new large regiment, The Rifles.

== History ==
The Territorials in Dorset trace their origins to the 1st Administrative Battalion, Dorsetshire Rifle Volunteers formed at Dorchester. Its first formation consisted of the following: The first volunteer corps in Dorset had their headquarters in Dorchester. The 1st Dorsetshire Rifle Volunteer Corps (1 Dorsetshire RVC) was at Bridport, 2 Dorsetshire RVC at Wareham, 3 Dorsetshire Rifle Volunteer Corps at Dorchester, 4th Dorsetshire RVC at Poole, 5 Dorsetshire RVC at Weymouth, 6 Dorsetshire RVC at Wimborne, 7 Dorsetshire RVC at Sherborne, 8 RVC at Blandford, 9 Dorsetshire RVC – Shaftesbury, 10 Dorsetshire RVC at Sturminster, 11 Dorsetshire RVC at Gillingham, and 12 Dorsetshire RVC at Stalbridge.

Eventually in 1880 as a result of the Childers Reforms the regiment was re-designated to the 1st Dorsetshire Rifle Volunteers. Just a year later it moved under control of the Dorsetshire Regiment as the volunteer battalion.

=== Early history ===
The Dorsetshire Regiment was established in the Regular Army in 1881 under the Childers Reforms by the amalgamation of the 39th (Dorsetshire) Regiment of Foot and the 54th (West Norfolk) Regiment of Foot. The 1st Battalion was stationed in Malta from 1888, in Egypt from 1889, and in British India from 1893, where it took part in operations in the Tirah Campaign on the North West Frontier in 1897–98.

The 2nd Battalion was stationed in Ireland from 1893 to 1897, then in Malta from 1899. Following the outbreak of the Second Boer War, they were sent to South Africa in November 1899, and was engaged in the hard fighting after the battle of Colenso in December 1899. The battalion was the last to leave Spion Kop following the battle there in January 1900, and covered the retreat on that occasion. It took part in the subsequent movements leading up to the Relief of Ladysmith and was engaged in the operations which resulted in clearing the Boer forces out of Natal. They subsequently took part in the battle of Alleman's Nek (Almond's Nek), west of Volksrust on 11 June 1900, when 50 men were killed. The battalion stayed in South Africa throughout the war, which ended in June 1902 with the Peace of Vereeniging. Four months later 300 officers and men left Cape Town on the SS German in late September 1902, and arrived at Southampton in late October, when they were posted to Portland.

In 1908, the Volunteers and Militia were reorganised nationally, with the former becoming the Territorial Force and the latter the Special Reserve; the regiment now had one Reserve battalion and one Territorial battalion. (Note: These were the 3rd (Reserve) Battalion at the Regimental Depot and the 4th (TF) Battalion at High West Street, both in Dorchester.)

=== First World War ===
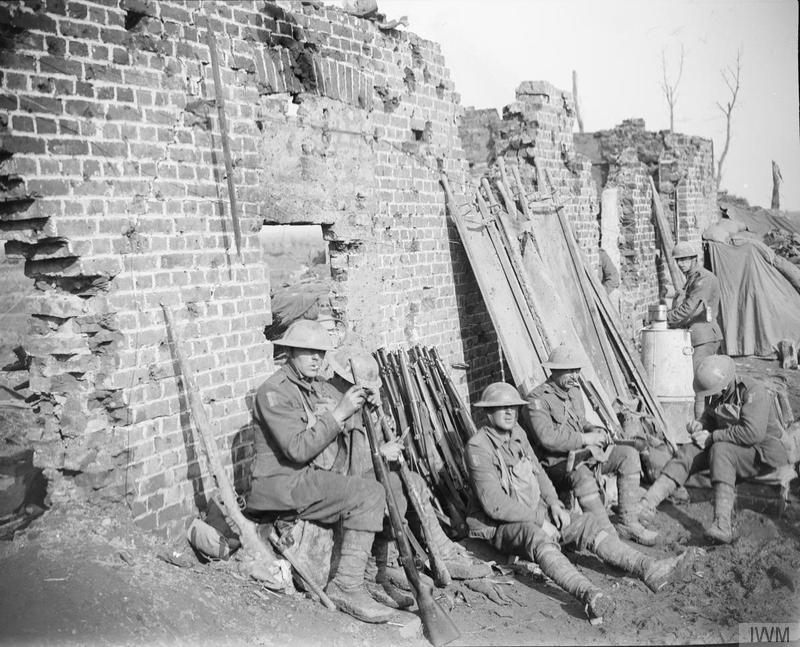
Troops of the Dorsetshire Regiment resting and cleaning rifles in the ruins of a farm near Langemarcke, 17 October 1917.

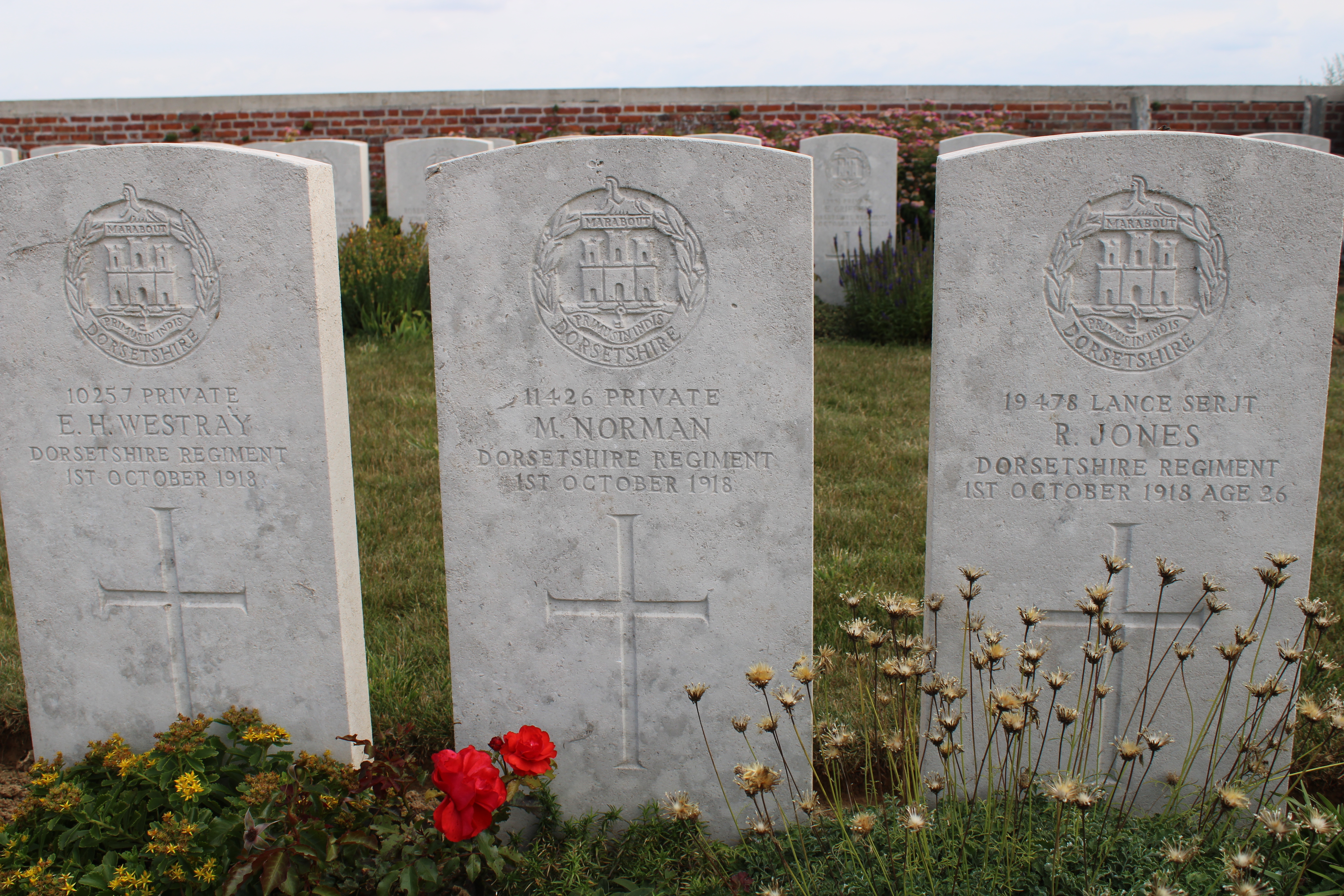
Graves of three soldiers of the Dorsetshire Regiment who died at Epinoy, France on 1 October 1918.

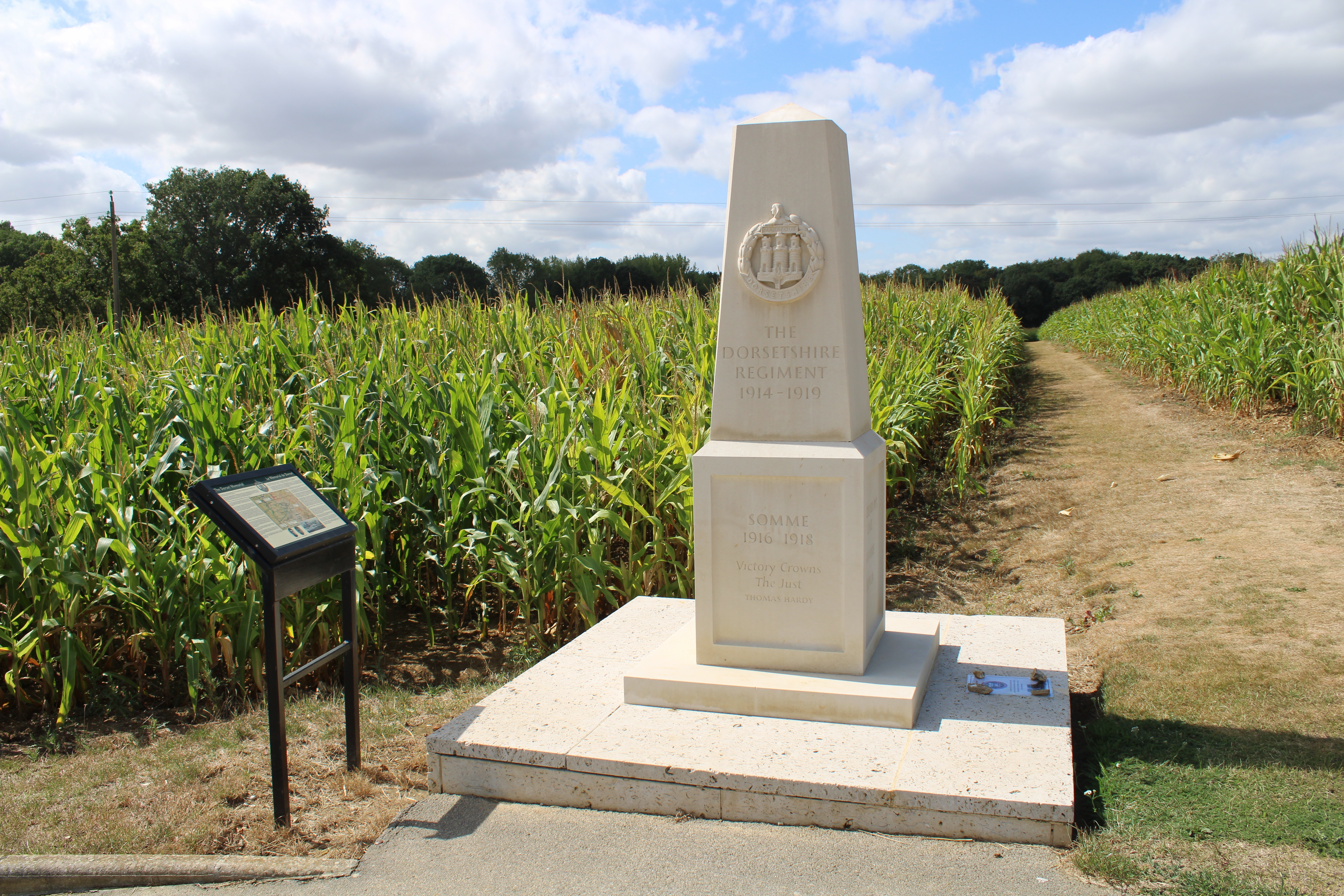
The Dorset Memorial to Authuille.

During the First World War, nine hostilities-only battalions were formed, six battalions serving overseas. The 1st Battalion and 6th (Service) battalion served on the Western Front throughout most of the war. Additional battalions (1/4th Battalion, 2/4th Battalion and 3/4th Battalion) were formed as part of the Territorial Force to meet the demand for troops on the Western Front.

==== Regular Army ====
The 1st Battalion was in Belfast when war broke out: it landed at Le Havre in August 1914 forming part of the 15th Brigade in the 5th Division. It transferred to 95th Brigade in the 32nd Division in December 1915 and to the 14th Brigade in the same Division in January 1916.

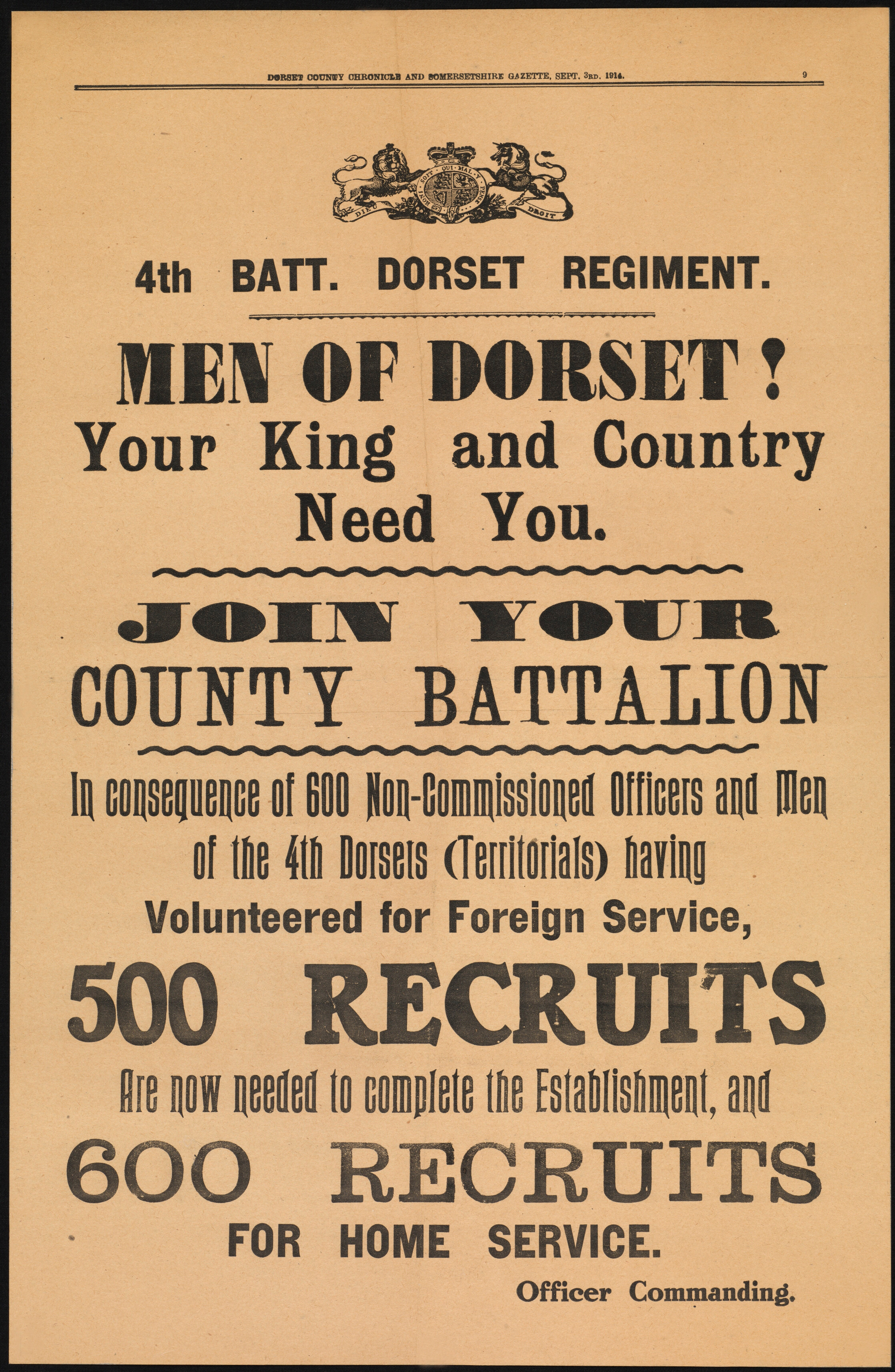
British Army recruiting poster : "4th Batt. Dorset Regiment. Men Of Dorset ! Your King And Country Need You. Join Your County Battalion".

The 2nd Battalion was in Poona, India, when war broke out and was shipped, as part of the 16th Indian Brigade, to Mesopotamia, where it was trapped in the Siege of Kut and captured by the Turks. (Of the 350 men of the battalion captured, only 70 survived their captivity.) During the siege, returning sick and wounded, and the few replacements who had been sent out, were unable to re-join their battalion, so they, and similar drafts of the 2nd Norfolk Regiment, were amalgamated into a scratch battalion forming part of the force attempting to relieve Kut. This battalion was formally titled the Composite English Battalion, but was more commonly known as The Norsets; it was broken up in July 1916, when the 2nd Dorsets was re-constituted. The battalion then served in Egypt as part of 9th Indian Brigade in the 3rd Indian Division.

==== Special Reserve ====
The 3rd (Reserve) Battalion remained in the UK fulfilling its role of training reinforcement drafts for the Regular battalions (including the 'Norsets'). It was also instrumental in setting up the 7th (Reserve) Battalion to do the same for the 5th and 6th (Service) Battalions, and the 1st and 2nd (later 8th) Home Service Battalions.

==== Territorial Force ====
The 1/4th Battalion of the Territorial Force served in India and Mesopotamia and 2/4th Battalion in India and Egypt.

==== New Army ====
The 5th (Service) Battalion, part of the 11th (Northern) Division, took part in the Gallipoli campaign, and having been evacuated from there in December 1915, went to Egypt before joining the war on the Western Front in July 1916.

The 6th (Service) Battalion was shipped to Boulogne in France in July 1915 as part of the 50th Infantry Brigade in the 17th (Northern) Division and saw action on the Western Front.

=== Irish War of Independence ===
The 3/4th (Reserve) Battalion was moved to Ebrington Barracks in Derry in April 1918. The 3rd (Reserve) Battalion also served in Derry from March 1919, absorbing the 3/4th Battalion as postwar demobilisation progressed. The remaining personnel were drafted to the 1st Battalion in August 1919.

In April 1920, during the Irish War of Independence, soldiers of the regiment fired at a rioting crowd on Bridge Street in Derry to disperse it, which led to attacks by Irish nationalists on British troops in the city and full-scale riots. Ulster Volunteers in Derry set up checkpoints and attacked local Catholics, which the Dorsets and Royal Irish Constabulary did nothing to prevent.

In 1921, a detachment from the Dorset Regiment was based in Enniscorthy, County Wexford (which was under martial law) where it was accused of mistreating several Irish Republican Army prisoners being held in the courthouse. On 7 February 1920 4th Battalion was reformed in the TF (soon afterwards reorganised as the Territorial Army (TA)) with its headquarters in Dorchester and four companies (A–D).

=== Malabar Campaign ===
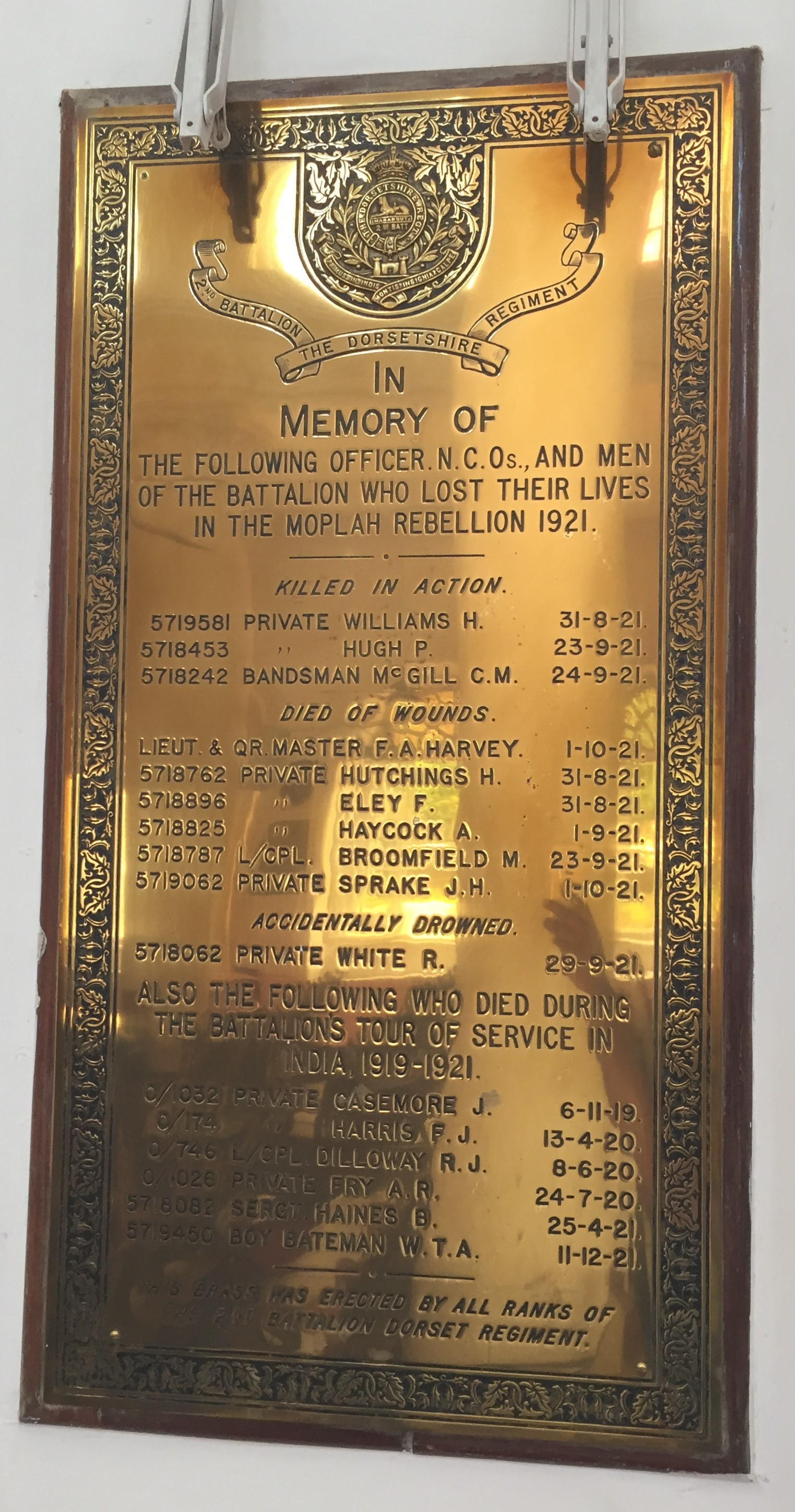
Memorial for the Officers and Men of the Dorset Regiment, who lost their lives in the Moplah Revolt, at the St. Mark's Cathedral, Bangalore

In Summer 1921, the 2nd Battalion served under the command of Major-General John Burnett-Stuart, General Officer Commanding Madras District in India, where he was involved in the suppression of the Moplah Rebellion at Malabar between 1921 and 1922. The riots that they quashed were inspired by 10,000 guerrillas and led to 2,300 executions.

The Officers and Men from the Dorset Regiment who lost their lives while taking part in the suppression of the revolt are commemorated in a brass tablet at the St. Mark's Cathedral, Bangalore.

=== Second World War ===
In the Second World War, the regiment expanded to eight battalions. (Note: Four Btns were formed prewar: 1, 2, 4 & 5; the war-formed btns were 30 (ex 6), 7, 8 & 9 (ex 70).)

The 1st Battalion was a regular army unit and part of the 231st Infantry Brigade, alongside the 1st Hampshires and 2nd Devonshires, for the duration of the war, fighting in Malta between 1940 and 1942, Sicily in August 1943, and Italy in September 1943. The 1st Dorsets landed on Gold Beach on D-Day in June 1944 as a part of the 50th (Northumbrian) Infantry Division and fought with the division in the Battle of Normandy and North-West Europe, until the division was withdrawn in late 1944 and used as a training division. The battalion had troops 327 killed and 1,029 wounded.

The 2nd Battalion was also a regular army unit and was part of the 5th Infantry Brigade, 2nd Infantry Division, throughout the war, participating in the Battle of France and the Dunkirk evacuation in 1940. In 1944, it took part in the Battle of Kohima during the Burma Campaign of 1944–1945, still with the 2nd Division.

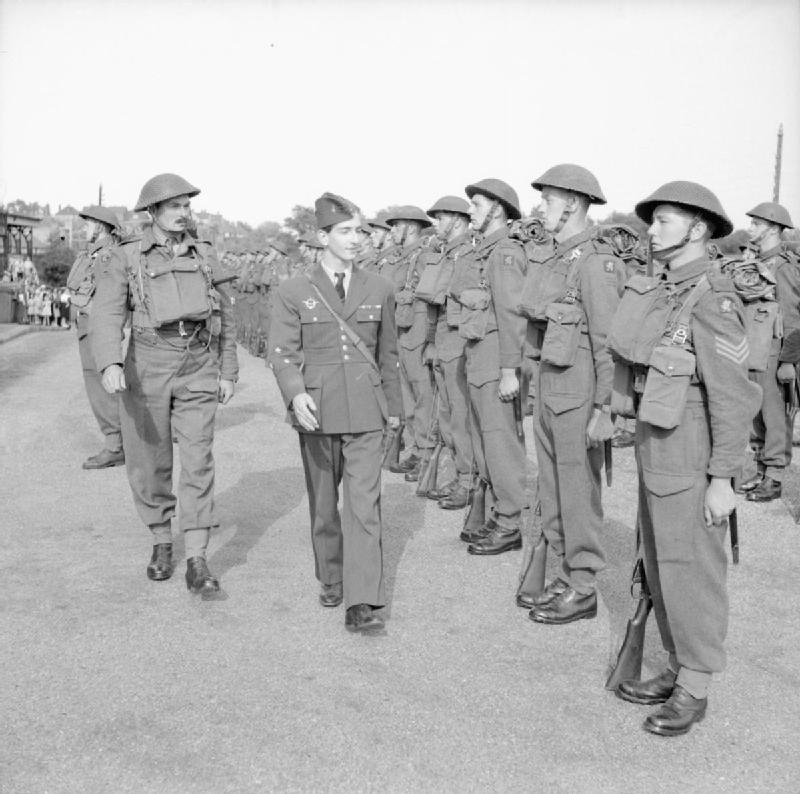
King Peter II of Yugoslavia inspecting the Guard of Honour of a battalion of the Dorset Regiment in England.

The 4th Battalion was an original 1st Line TA unit and, in 1939, raised a 2nd Line duplicate, the 5th Battalion, when the Territorial Army was doubled in size prior to the commencement of the war. The 4th and 5th Battalions were both part of 130th Infantry Brigade in the 43rd (Wessex) Infantry Division, participating in the Normandy Campaign, Operation Market Garden and the Rhine Crossing.

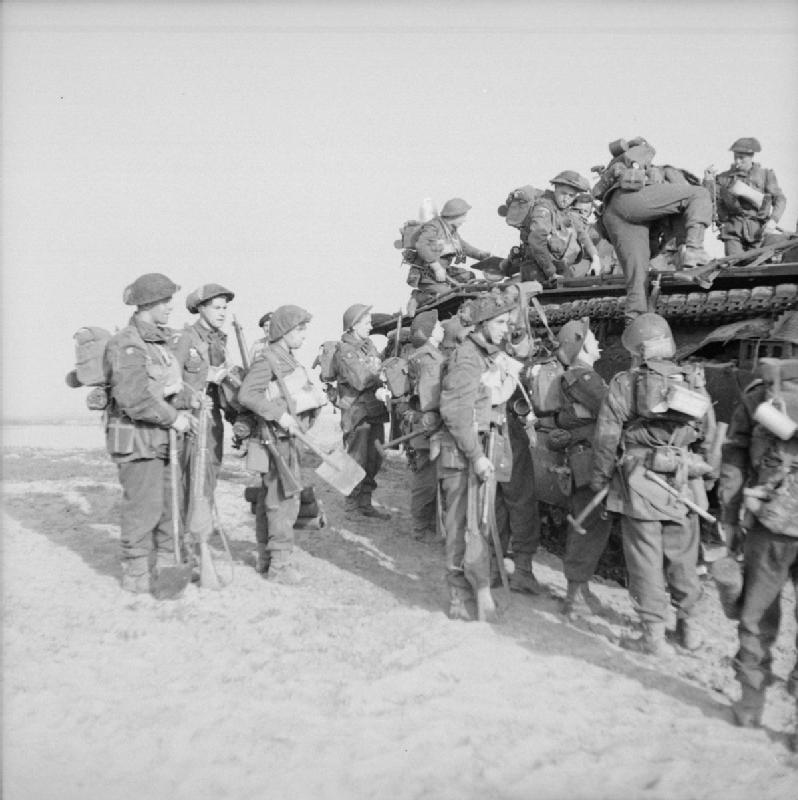
Men of the 5th Battalion, Dorsetshire Regiment climb into a Buffalo in preparation for crossing the Rhine, Germany, 28 March 1945.

The 30th Battalion, previously the 6th (Home Defence) Battalion, was with the 43rd Infantry Brigade in North Africa and the invasion of Sicily, after which it spent the rest of the war in Gibraltar.

The 7th Battalion, which was raised in 1940, was later converted to the 110th Light Anti-Aircraft Regiment, Royal Artillery. The regiment served with the 43rd (Wessex) Division in North-West Europe from June 1944 to May 1945.

The 8th Battalion, which was also raised in 1940 as 50th (Holding) Battalion, was initially assigned to the 210th Independent Infantry Brigade (Home) and was on home defence. Later, the battalion converted to the 105th Light Anti-Aircraft Regiment, Royal Artillery. The regiment was sent to North Africa in late 1942 and fought with the British First Army, It later served in the Italian Campaign supporting US Fifth Army.

=== Post war and amalgamation ===
In 1958, the regiment amalgamated with the Devonshire Regiment to form the Devonshire and Dorset Regiment.

== Regimental museum ==
The regimental collection is displayed in the Keep Military Museum in Dorchester.

== Battle honours ==
The regiment was awarded the following battle honours. Those from the two World Wars that are emblazoned on the Queen's Colour are indicated in bold:

- From 39th Regiment of Foot: Plassey, Gibraltar 1779–83, Albuhera, Vittoria, Pyrenees, Nivelle, Nive, Orthes, Peninsula, Maharajpore, Sevastopol
- From 54th Regiment of Foot: Marabout, Egypt, Ava
- Martinique 1794 (awarded in 1909 for service of the 39th Regiment), Tirah, Relief of Ladysmith, South Africa 1899–1902
- The Great War (13 battalions): **Mons**, Le Cateau, Retreat from Mons, **Marne 1914**, Aisne 1914, La Bassée 1914, Armentières 1914, **Ypres 1915 '17**, Gravenstafel, St. Julien, Bellewaarde, **Somme 1916 '18**, Albert 1916 '18, Flers-Courcelette, Thiepval, Ancre 1916 '18, Arras 1917, Scarpe 1917, Messines 1917, Langemarck 1917, Polygon Wood, Broodseinde, Poelcappelle, Passchendaele, St. Quentin, Amiens, Bapaume 1918, **Hindenburg Line**, Épéhy, Canal du Nord, St. Quentin Canal, Beaurevoir, Cambrai 1918, Selle, **Sambre**, France and Flanders 1914–18, **Suvla**, Landing at Suvla, Scimitar Hill, Gallipoli 1915, Egypt 1916, **Gaza**, El Mughar, Nebi Samwil, Jerusalem, Tell 'Asur, Megiddo, Sharon, Palestine 1917–18, Basra, **Shaiba**, Kut al Amara 1915 '17, **Ctesiphon**, Defence of Kut al Amara, Baghdad, Khan Baghdadi, Mesopotamia 1914–18
- The Second World War: **St. Omer-La Bassée**, **Normandy Landing**, Villers Bocage, Tilly sur Seulles, **Caen**, Mont Pincon, St. Pierre La Vielle, **Arnhem 1944**, **Aam**, **Geilenkirchen**, Goch, Rhine, Twente Canal, North-West Europe 1940 '44–45, **Landing in Sicily**, Agira, Regalbuto, Sicily 1943, Landing at Porto San Venere, Italy 1943, **Malta 1940–42**, **Kohima**, **Mandalay**, Mt. Popa, Burma 1944–45

== Victoria Cross ==
The following member of the regiment was awarded the Victoria Cross:

- Private (later Corporal) Samuel Vickery, Tirah Campaign

== Regimental colonels ==
Colonels of the regiment were:

- 1881–1889 (1st Battalion): Gen. John Ramsay Stuart, CB
- 1881–1892 (2nd Battalion only to 1889): Gen. Sir Charles Thomas van Straubenzee, GCB
- 1892–1894: Lt-Gen. Robert John Eagar, CB
- 1894–1903: Gen. Henry Ralph Browne, CB
- 1903–1909: Lt-Gen. Sir Matthew William Edward Gosset, KCB
- 1909–1910: Lt-Gen. Lindsay Farrington
- 1910: Maj-Gen. William de Wilton Roche Thackwell, CB
- 1910–1922: Maj-Gen. Henry Cook, CB
- 1922–1933: Maj-Gen. Sir Arlington Augustus Chichester, KCMG, CB, DSO
- 1933–1946: Maj-Gen. Sir Hubert Jervoise Huddleston, GCMG, GBE, CB, DSO, MC
- 1946–1952: Brig. Charles Hall Woodhouse, OBE, MC
- 1952–1958: Maj-Gen. George Neville Wood, CB, CBE, DSO, MC
- 1958 Regiment amalgamated with The Devonshire Regiment to form the Devonshire and Dorset Regiment

== Gallery ==
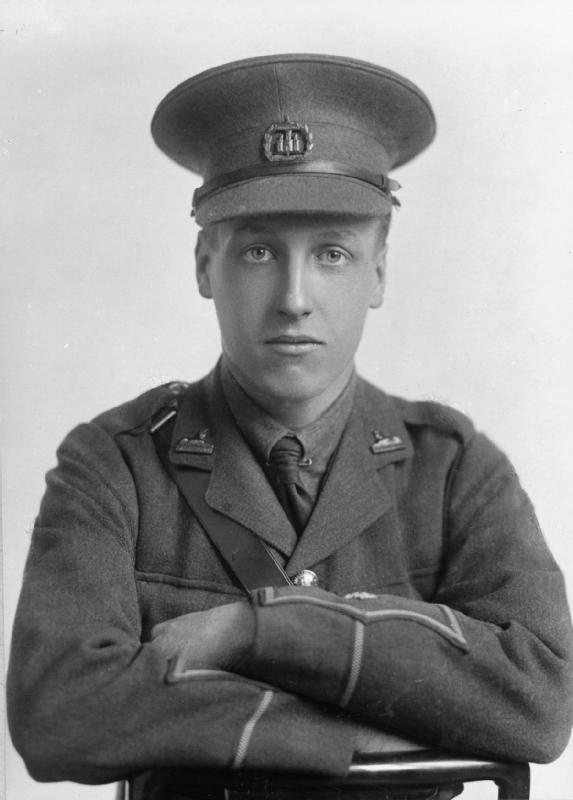
Lieutenant Vizard, an officer serving with 4th battalion in the First World War

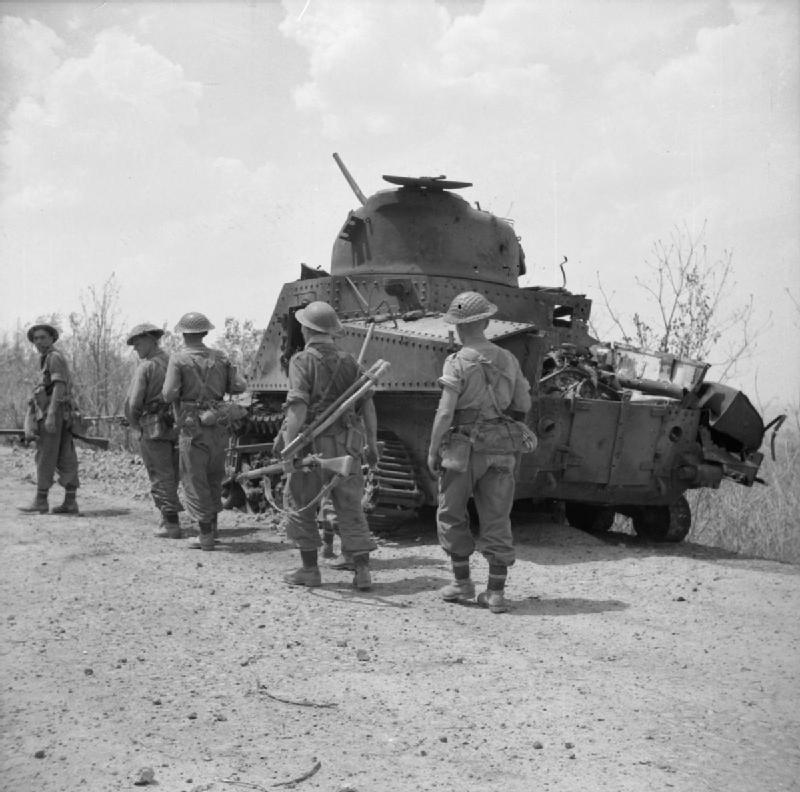
Men of the 2nd Dorsetshires passing a knocked out Lee tank at Mount Popa, April 1945

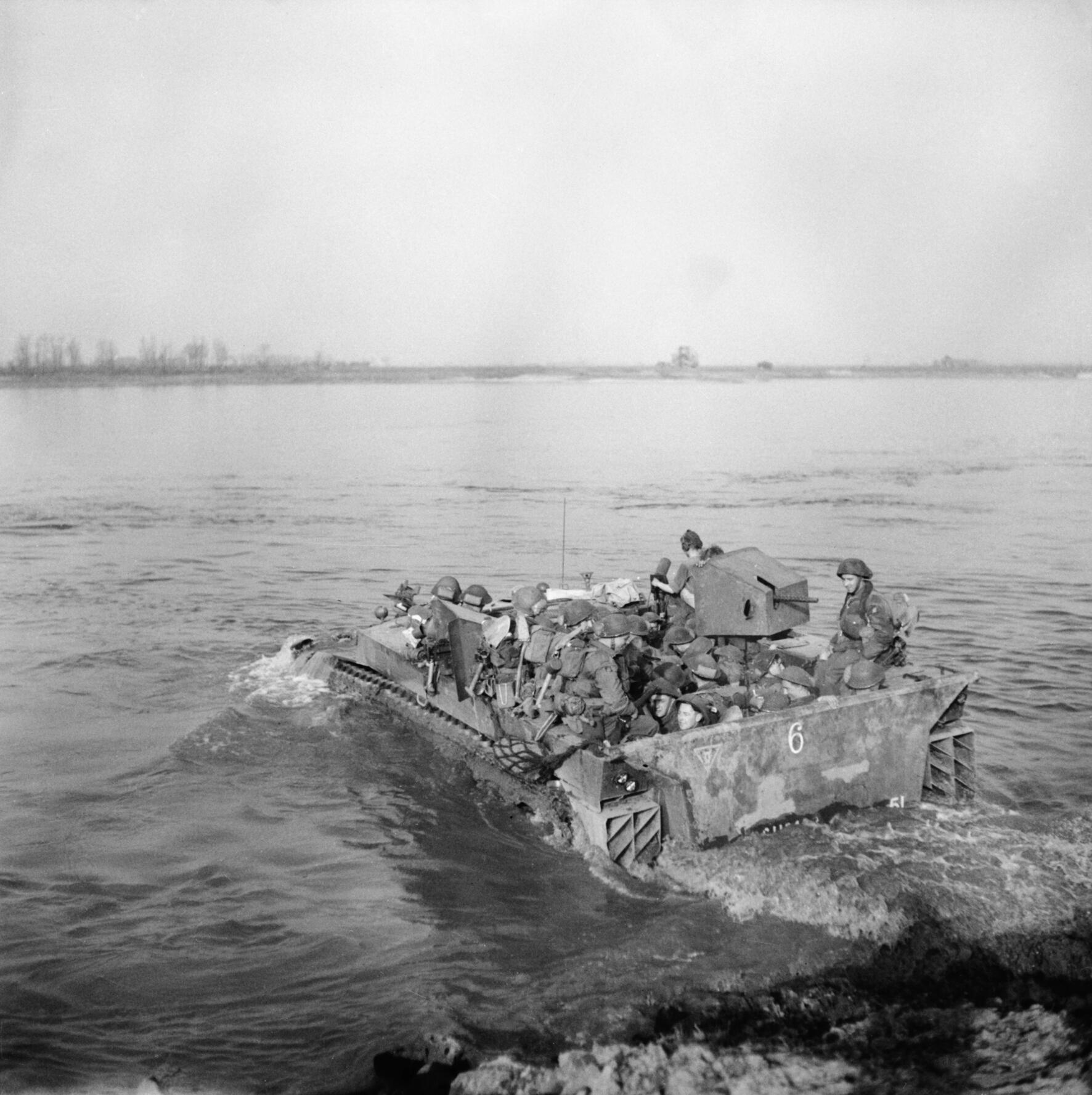
Soldiers of 5th Battalion during the Rhine crossing, March 1945
