= High West Street drill hall =

Former military installation in England

- Dorchester
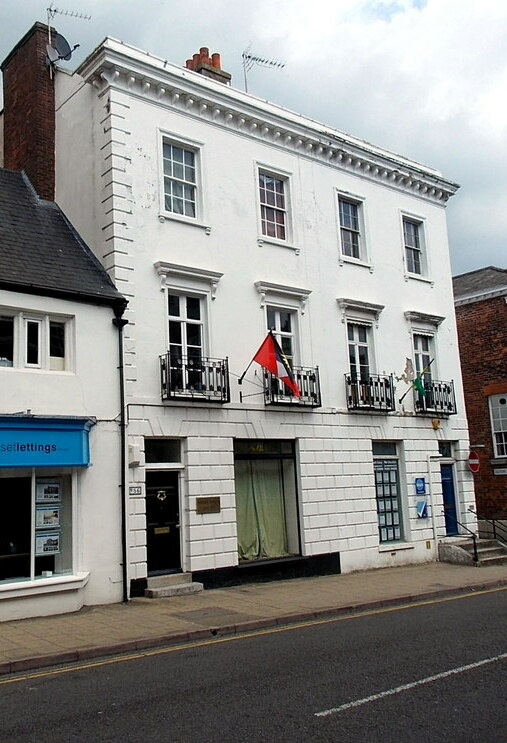
- High West Street drill hall

Site information
- Type: Drill hall

Location
- Location within Dorset
- Coordinates: 50.71533°N 2.43936°W

Site history
- Built: 1849
- Built for: War Office
- In use: 1849-1967

The High West Street drill hall is a former military installation in Dorchester, Dorset. It is a Grade II listed building.

== History ==
The building, which was built as a residential property in 1849, was converted in the late 19th century for use as the headquarters of the Dorsetshire Rifle Volunteers. This unit evolved to become the 1st Volunteer Battalion, The Dorsetshire Regiment in 1887 and the 4th Battalion, The Dorsetshire Regiment in 1908. The battalion was mobilised at the drill hall in August 1914 before being deployed to India. After the Territorial Army infantry presence in Dorchester was reduced to a single company, C Company (Dorset), Wessex Volunteers, at the newly built Poundbury Road Territorial Army Centre, in 1967, the High West Street drill hall was decommissioned and subsequently converted for commercial use.
