= Dorset Rifle Volunteers =

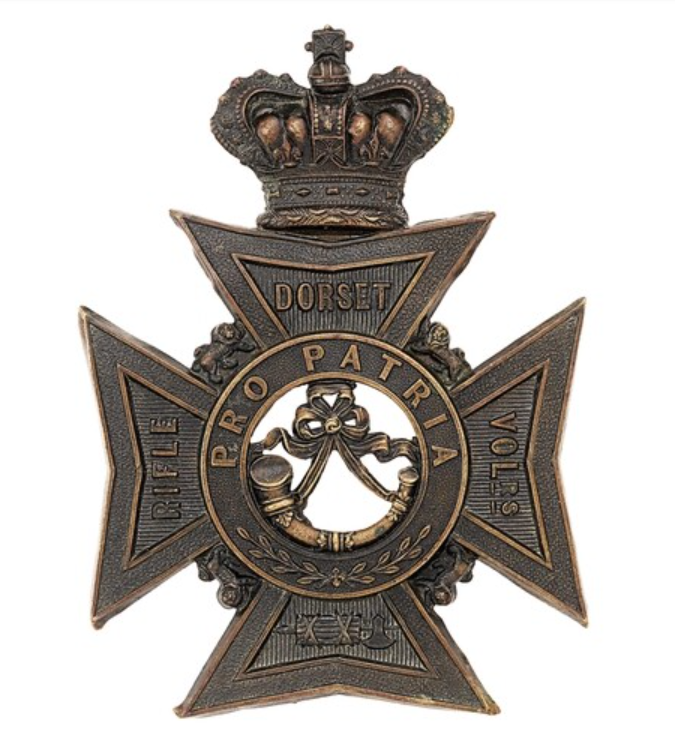
- Shako badge of the Dorset Volunteer Rifle Battalion, c.1878
- Active: 1859 - 1881
- Allegiance: United Kingdom
- Branch: Volunteer Force
- Type: Rifles
- Size: Battalion (12 companies)
- Garrison/HQ: Dorchester, Dorset
- Campaigns: Anglo-French Tensions (home defence)

Commanders
- Notable commanders: Lt-Col. George Pleydell Mansel

The Dorset Rifle Volunteers, (also known as the Dorsetshire Volunteer Rifle Battalion), was a unit of the Volunteer Force of the British Army located in the county of Dorset. The volunteers amalgamated to form the 3rd Volunteer Battalion, Dorset Regiment as a result of the Childers Reforms in 1881.

== Background ==
Following the Crimean War, the British Parliament realized the need for a locally raised corps of volunteer citizen-soldiers to fulfill the role of home defence while the regular army and militia were serving overseas. The volunteer corps would take over home garrison duties to allow the regular soldiers to be quickly dispatched wherever they were needed across the Empire. Volunteer corps had been raised before in Britain during the Napoleonic Wars for the same reasons, and the Rifle Volunteers would be largely based on this design.

The volunteer corps could only be embodied during a time of war or national emergency, and in such instance would be placed under the command of the county Lord-Lieutenant.

In 1858, tensions between the United Kingdom and France increased drastically due to an attempted assassination of Emperor Napoleon III. The perpetrator, Felice Orsini, had made the bombs that were used in the attempt in a Birmingham factory. Many French military officers called for military action against Britain, and the threat of a much larger French Army crossing the English Channel forced the government to bolster home defences.

In 1859, France went to war with Italy against Austria, and it was feared that another large scale war would break out involving all of Europe.

== Formation ==
On May 12, 1859, the Secretary of State for War authorized the formation of volunteer rifle and artillery corps in counties in England, Scotland, and Wales. The rifle corps were to be raised under the auspices of the Volunteer Act 1804, and to be formed from existing rifle clubs in the county. The rifle companies were initially to be no larger than 100 men, and commanded by a captain, but by 1861 the many small independent companies were an administrative burden and were consolidated into battalions. The volunteers in many cases had to provide their own arms, uniforms, and equipment, and expenses would only be paid while the men were on active service.

The first volunteer rifle corps in Dorset was raised on June 1, 1859, in Bridport as the Bridport Volunteers under Capt. Henry Templer. Also in 1859, the Gillingham Rifles were raised in Gillingham.

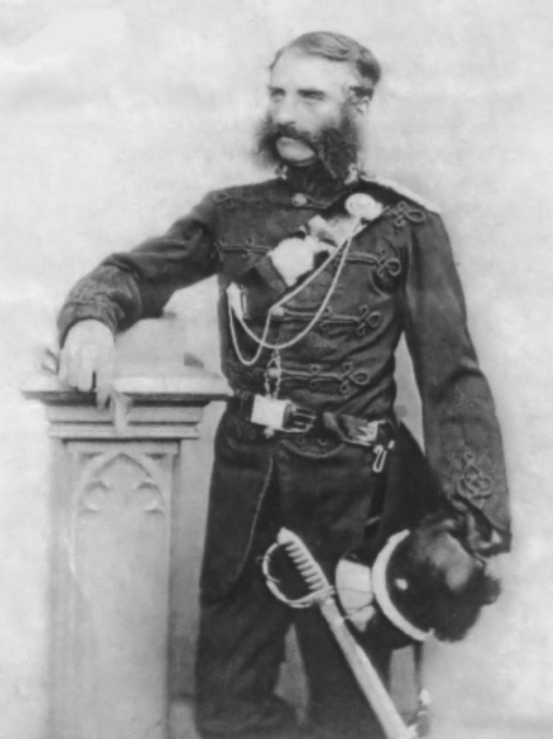
Capt. Henry A. Templer, 1st Bridport VRC

On May 9, 1860, the 1st Administrative Battalion, Dorset Volunteer Rifle Corps was established under Lt-Col. George P. Mansel, and the individual rifle companies were numbered within the Dorset VRC. The twelve companies were:

- 1st (Bridport) Dorset VRC - Raised (from the Bridport Volunteers) under Capt. Henry Templer, Lt. Henry Saunders Edwards, and Ens. Hounsell, based in Bridport
- 2nd (Wareham) Dorset VRC - Raised on January 28, 1860, under Capt. Oliver William Farrer, Lt. Charles Lacey, Ens. Charles James Radclyffe, based in Wareham
- 3rd (Dorchester) Dorset VRC - Raised on February 14, 1860, under Capt. Edward Leigh Kindersley, Lt. Thomas Coombs, Ens. Robert Devenish, based in Dorchester
- 4th (Poole) Dorset VRC - Raised on February 13, 1860, under Capt. William Parr, Lt. Thomas Cox, Ens. George B. Aldridge, based in Poole
- 5th (Weymouth) Dorset VRC - Raised on May 14, 1860, under Lt. George Poulter Welsford, Ens. John Thresher, based in Weymouth
- 6th (Wimborne) Dorset VRC - Raised on March 14, 1860, under Capt. St John Coventry, Lt. Thomas Rawlings, Ens. Edward Robinson, based in Wimborne Minster
- 7th (Sherborne) Dorset VRC - Raised on March 29, 1860, under Capt. John Frederick Falwasser, Lt. John George Bergman, Ens. John Young Melmoth, based in Sherborne
- 8th (Blandford) Dorset VRC - Raised on February 29, 1860, under Capt. George P. Mansel, Lt. Robert C. Farquharson, Ens. Francis T. John, based at Blandford Forum
- 9th (Shaftesbury) Dorset VRC - Raised on March 10, 1860, under Capt. Thomas B. Bower, Lt. William E. Barridge, Ens. William R.H. Bennett, based at Shaftesbury

Besides the 1st Dorset Volunteer Battalion, there also existed a second rifle battalion in Dorset, the Blackmore Vale Rifle Corps, and was composed of three subdivisions:

- 10th (Blackmore Vale or Sturminster) Dorset VRC - Raised on July 10, 1860, under Lt. Montague Williams, Ens. Henry C. Dashwood, based in Sturminster Newton
- 11th (Gillingham) Dorset VRC - Raised on July 7, 1860 (from the Gillingham Rifles) under Lt. Robert S. Freame, based at Gillingham
- 12th (Stalbridge) Dorset VRC - Raised on July 7, 1860, under Lt. John R. Lyon, Ens. Henry W. Langton, based in Stalbridge

The Blackmore Vale Rifle Corps was a separate entity until August 1862, when it formally became part of the 1st Dorset Volunteer Battalion, with the three corps joining the first nine.

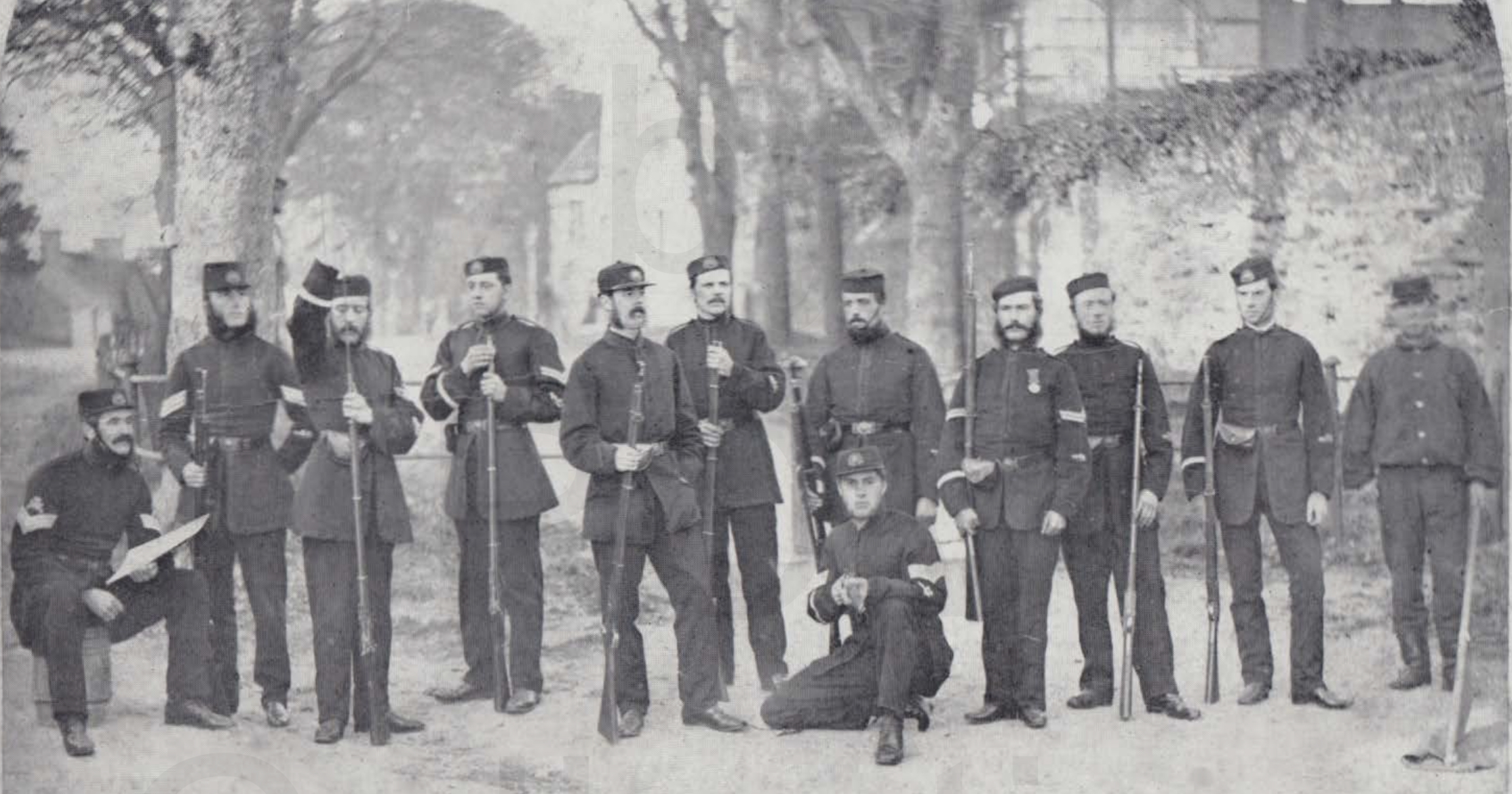
Men of the 3rd (Dorchester) Rifle Corps in 1863. Pte. J. Godwin, standing 6th from left.

The uniform of the 1st - 9th Corps consisted of a rifle green tunic and pants with scarlet piping, while the 10th, 11th, and 12th Corps wore rifle green with French grey facings. Until 1865, the individual corps produced and wore their own cap badge incorporating the coat of arms of the town where they were headquartered. In 1865, Colonel Mansel formalized one badge for the whole Dorset Battalion, consisting of the Mansel family crest, a Cap of maintenance, above the numeric designation of each corps, and encircled by “Dorset Rifle Volunteers”.

Some of the companies in the battalion had bands which performed at reviews and parades. The 3rd, 5th, 7th, and 9th companies had brass bands of 14 men each, while the 4th, 6th, and 8th companies had fife and drum bands of the same number. The fife and drum band of the 1st (Bridport) company was uniformed in the style of Zouaves, under the command of Band-Sergeant Northover.

== Service ==
Once the Dorset VRC Battalion was formed in 1860, the volunteers began their training and duties throughout the county. According to the regulations established in the Volunteer Act, rifle volunteers were required to attend 8 training days in a 4-month period in order to be considered "effective".

The Dorset VRC companies trained and drilled for the most part in their respective villages and parishes, but the Battalion as a whole would gather at Maiden Castle for shooting competitions and parades. The volunteers were equipped with the 1853 Enfield and the majority of volunteer training consisted of drill and rifle practice.

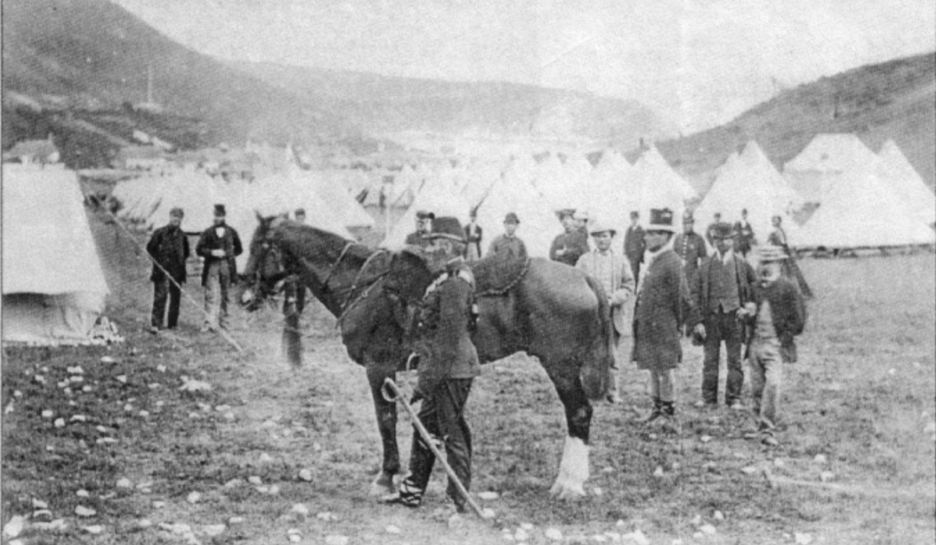
Camp of the Dorset VRC Battalion at Lulworth Cove, 1864. Capt. Templer in the foreground with horse.

In October 1863, the battalion strength was noted as being 903 men across all companies.

Inter-battalion shooting matches were common among the volunteers, not only providing necessary rifle training, but also fostering a spirit of comradery between the soldiers. On November 28, 1866, the 12th (Stalbridge) VRC competed against the Baltonsborough Company, Gloucestershire Battalion, in a rifle match at Maiden Castle. The volunteers fired five shots at 200, 500, and 600 yards each, and the Stalbridge volunteers won by 36 points. The 1st Place volunteer was Pte. Henry Harris, 12th Stalbridge VRC, with 58 points.

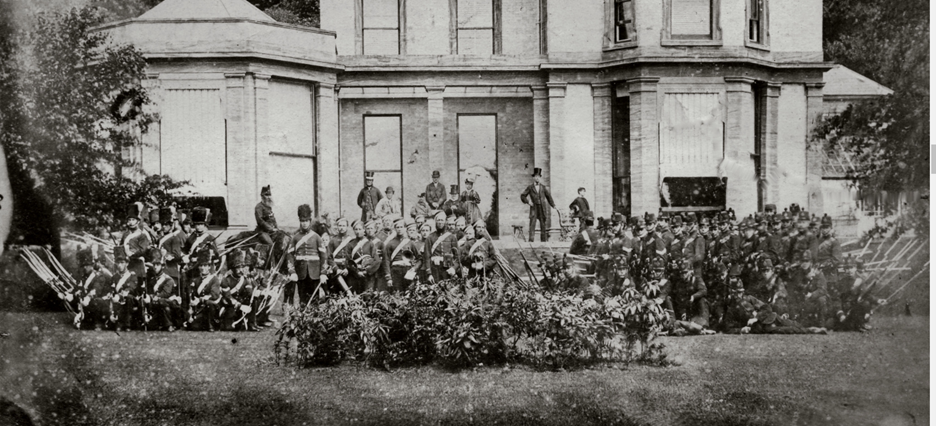
Volunteers of the 1st (Bridport) VRC, formed up outside Mountfield House, c.1865

On May 27, 1867, the Dorset VRC Battalion, along with battalions from Hampshire, Somerset, Wiltshire, and Gloucestershire participated in a Grand Review on Salisbury Plain. The Volunteers paraded through the town and were inspected on the fields, before celebrating with a great feast and dance.

The Dorset VRC, along with other VRC Battalions, participated annually in the NRA competitions at Wimbledon, shooting for the Queen's Prize. In June 1867, the Dorset VRC held a shooting match to determine which volunteers would represent the battalion at Wimbledon. 25 volunteers were eventually chosen, and drawn from the 12th, 5th, 2nd, 9th, 7th, 8th, 1st, 3rd, 6th, and 11th companies. The top five shooters at the match were:

- 1st: Lt. Johns (8th Blandford) - 64 points
- 2nd: Pte. Hibbs (6th Wimborne) - 60 points
- 3rd: Pte. Groves (8th Blandford) - 60 points
- 4th: Pte. H. Harris (12th Stalbridge) - 58 points
- 5th: Pte. Elmes (8th Blandford) - 57 points

In September 1867, Weymouth was chosen as the drill and parade grounds for the Dorset Rifle Battalion, and the village was festooned for the arrival of the volunteers. All twelve companies, 750 men in total, arrived at Weymouth Station and were formed up into ranks, marching down King Street towards the town centre. The Dorset Battalion was treated to a luncheon before marching to Lodmoor for parade exercises and a review. The volunteers participated in a "sham-battle" against a force from the Regular Army, conduction battle formations and maneuvers. The day was ended with another feast and band demonstration.

== Amalgamation ==
In 1872, the rifle volunteers were placed under the direct command of the Secretary of State for War, and were integrated with the local regular army units. With the passing of the 1881 Childers Reforms, the volunteer corps were absorbed by their county regiment as volunteer battalions, and thus the Dorset Volunteer Rifle Battalion became the 3rd Volunteer Battalion, Dorset Regiment.

Lord Chelmsford served as an officer in the 1st (Volunteer) Battalion, Dorsetshire Regiment in the early 1900s.
