= Childers Reforms =

Reorganisation of regiments of the British Army

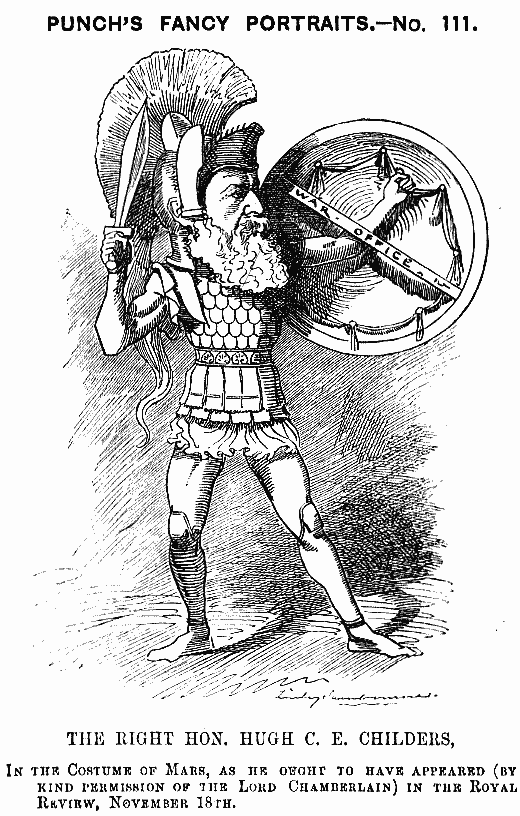
Cartoon depicting Secretary of State for War Hugh Childers, 1882.

The Childers Reforms of 1881 reorganised the infantry regiments of the British Army. The reforms were done by Secretary of State for War Hugh Childers during 1881, and were a continuation of the earlier Cardwell Reforms.

The reorganisation was effected by General Order 41/1881, issued on 1 May 1881, amended by G.O. 70/1881 dated 1 July, which created a network of multi-battalion regiments. In England, Wales and Scotland, each regiment was to have two regular or "line" battalions and two militia battalions. In Ireland, there were to be two line and three militia battalions. This was done by renaming the numbered regiments of foot and county militia regiments. In addition, the various corps of county rifle volunteers were to be designated as volunteer battalions. Each of these regiments was associated by headquarters location and territorial name to its local "Regimental District". The reforms became effective on 1 July.

From 1881, regimental seniority numbers were officially abolished and battalions came to be known by their number within the regiment and the regimental district name. Unofficially, the regiments were still referred to by their numbers by their officers and men, as tradition, and several regiments, such as "The Buffs" (the Royal East Kent Regiment), the Cameron Highlanders, and "the Black Watch", lobbied to keep their distinct names as part of their battalion titles.

In practice, it was not always possible to apply the scheme strictly: the Cameron Highlanders initially had only one regular battalion, while several regiments had more or fewer militia regiments than specified by the initial scheme. In addition, the King's Royal Rifle Corps and the Rifle Brigade (Prince Consort's Own) had no local regimental districts, and their affiliated militia and volunteer battalions were selected not on a territorial basis, but due to their "rifle" traditions. This structure lasted until 1948, when every regiment of line infantry had its regular battalions decreased to one, with only the three original Guards Division regiments retaining two regular battalions.

Also in 1881, short service was increased to seven years with the colours, and five with the reserve, of the twelve-year enlistment period that the Cardwell Reforms had introduced. He also introduced the ability for time-served soldiers to extend service in the reserve by four years, albeit classed as the second division, or Section D, of the First Class Army Reserve.

== Standardisation of uniforms and colours ==
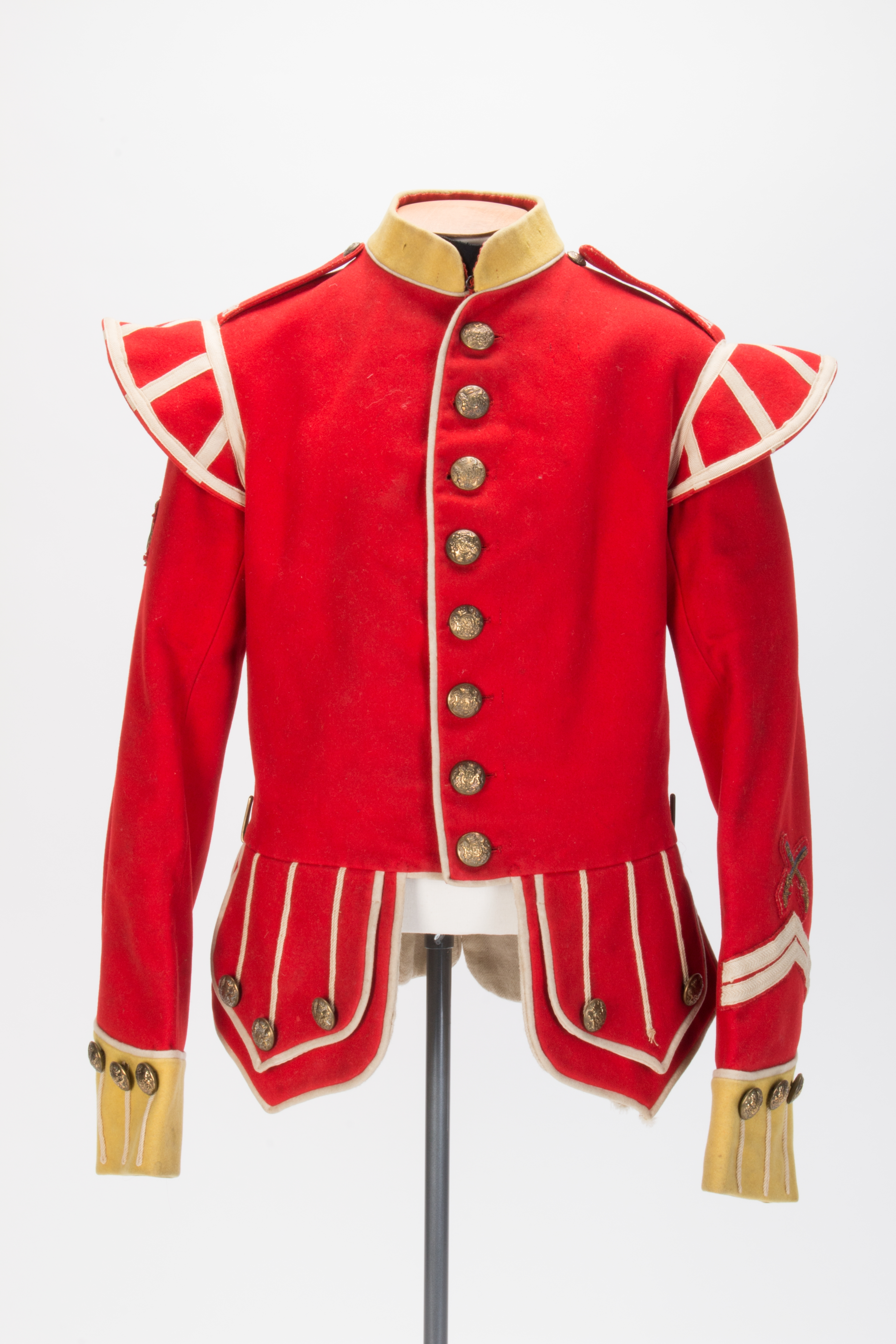
Dress tunic of a corporal of Princess Louises's (Argyll and Sutherland Highlanders), post-1881. The yellow facings indicate a Scottish regiment.

For reasons of economy and efficiency, an attempt was made to have the facings of uniforms standardised. (Facings are the lining of uniform jackets, made from material of the regimental colours; turning back the material at the cuffs, lapels and tails exposed the lining, or "facing".):

- 'Royal' regiments would have dark blue facings
- English and Welsh regiments would have white facings
- Irish regiments would wear green facings (in effect only the Connaught Rangers, as all other Irish regiments were 'Royal')
- Scottish regiments would have yellow facings.

Officers' uniforms had lace in distinctive national patterns:

- rose pattern for England and Wales
- thistle for Scotland
- shamrock for Ireland.

In the case of regular battalions, the lace was gold, while that of the militia battalions was silver. There were also attempts to assimilate regimental insignia and remove "tribal" uniform distinctions. This was less successful, as regimental tribalism and tradition caused much criticism. Two regiments that displayed a strong reaction were the 75th and the 92nd that were grudgingly joined together to become the Gordon Highlanders. The 75th went so far as to commission a marble monument to themselves in Malta where they were based at the time. They had spent so long away from Scotland that they were effectively an English unit that had to relearn how to wear kilts. The 92nd, though they lost much less identity in the amalgamation, staged a mock funeral procession to themselves, complete with a full-size coffin with the number '92' on it.

During 1890, The Buffs succeeded in being allowed to resume the wearing of buff facings, initially at regimental expense and design. Within a few years, a number of other regiments had replaced white facings with traditional colours. After 1935, the ruling on blue facings for royal regiments effectively lapsed. That year, in celebration of his silver jubilee, King George V designated three regiments as royal. In each case, they were "permitted to retain their present facings". During 1939, the Royal Inniskilling Fusiliers, who had worn blue facings since 1881, were issued buff regimental colours "by request and gracious permission". In 1946, three more infantry regiments were designated as "royal" for services during World War II. Of these, only the Royal Lincolnshire Regiment replaced its (white) facings with blue.

== Regiments created ==
Original title	Changes	Regular battalions	Militia battalions	Volunteer battalions	Regimental district	Facings
The Royal Scots (Lothian Regiment)	1921: The Royal Scots (The Royal Regiment)	1st, or The Royal Scots Regiment (2 battalions)	The Edinburgh (or Queen's) Regiment of Light Infantry Militia	City of Edinburgh Rifle Volunteer Brigade (3 battalions); 2nd Edinburgh Rifle Volunteer Corps 2nd Midlothian (Midlothian and Peebles-shire) Rifle Volunteer Corps; 1st Berwickshire RVC (Note: Berwickshire, Dumfriesshire, Roxburghshire and Selkirkshire were transferred to the regimental district of the King's Own Scottish Borderers district 1887.); 1st Haddington RVC; 1st Linlithgowshire RVC	Berwickshire, City of Edinburgh, County of Edinburgh, Haddingtonshire, Linlithgowshire	Blue
The Queen's (Royal West Surrey Regiment)	1921: The Queen's Royal Regiment (West Surrey)	2nd (Queen's Royal) Regiment of Foot (2 battalions)	2nd Royal Surrey Militia	2nd Surrey RVC; 4th Surrey RVC; 6th Surrey RVC; 8th Surrey RVC	Part of Surrey (including Bermondsey, Croydon, Guildford and Southwark)	Blue
The Buffs (East Kent Regiment)	1935: The Buffs (Royal East Kent Regiment)	3rd (East Kent, The Buffs) Regiment of Foot (2 battalions)	East Kent Militia; A new 4th Battalion was also formed	2nd Kent (East Kent) RVC; 5th Kent (Weald of Kent) RVC	Part of Kent (including Ashford, Canterbury, Dover and Ramsgate)	White, changed to buff in 1890
The King's Own (Royal Lancaster Regiment)	1921: The King's Own Royal Regiment (Lancaster)	4th (King's Own Royal) Regiment of Foot (2 battalions)	1st Royal Lancashire Militia (Duke of Lancaster's Own) (2 battalions)	10th Lancashire RVC	Part of Lancashire (including Barrow-in-Furness, Lancaster, Morecambe and Ulverston)	Blue
The Northumberland Fusiliers	1935: The Royal Northumberland Fusiliers	5th (Northumberland) (Fusiliers) Regiment of Foot (2 battalions)	The Northumberland Light Infantry Militia	1st Northumberland (Northumberland and Berwick-on-Tweed) RVC; 2nd Northumberland RVC; 1st Newcastle upon Tyne RVC	Northumberland (including Berwick-upon-Tweed)	White, changed to gosling green in 1899
The Royal Warwickshire Regiment	1963: The Royal Warwickshire Fusiliers	6th (Royal 1st Warwickshire) Regiment of Foot (2 battalions)	1st Warwickshire Militia; 2nd Warwickshire Militia	1st Warwickshire (Birmingham) RVC; 2nd Warwickshire RVC	Warwickshire	Blue
The Royal Fusiliers (City of London Regiment)		7th (Royal Fusiliers) Regiment of Foot (2 battalions)	Royal London Militia 3rd or Royal Westminster Middlesex (Light Infantry) Militia; 4th or Royal South Middlesex Militia	Originally the 5th Middlesex RVC, 9th Middlesex RVC and 22nd Middlesex RVC; reallocated to King's Royal Rifle Corps 1882/3 Replaced by: 10th Middlesex RVC, 11th Middlesex RVC and 23rd Middlesex RVC; 1st Tower Hamlets Rifle Volunteer Brigade added 1904	City of London, part of Middlesex (the Tower division, Bloomsbury and Westminster)	Blue
The Liverpool Regiment	1881: The King's (Liverpool Regiment); 1921:The King's Regiment (Liverpool)	8th (the King's) Regiment of Foot (2 battalions)	2nd Royal Lancashire Militia (Duke of Lancaster's Own Rifles)	1st Lancashire RVC; Liverpool Rifle Brigade (5th Lancashire RVC); 13th Lancashire RVC; 15th Lancashire RVC; 18th Lancashire (Liverpool Irish) RVC; 19th Lancashire (Liverpool Press Guard) RVC; 1st Isle of Man RVC	Part of Lancashire (including Bootle, Liverpool and Southport) and the Isle of Man	Blue
The Norfolk Regiment	1935: The Royal Norfolk Regiment	9th (East Norfolk) Regiment of Foot (2 battalions)	1st or West Norfolk Militia; 2nd or East Norfolk Militia	1st Norfolk (City of Norwich) RVC; 2nd Norfolk RVC; 3rd Norfolk RVC; 4th Norfolk RVC	Norfolk	White, changed to yellow in 1905
The Lincolnshire Regiment	1946:The Royal Lincolnshire Regiment	10th (North Lincoln) Regiment of Foot (2 battalions)	Royal North Lincolnshire Militia; Royal South Lincolnshire Militia	1st Lincolnshire RVC; 2nd Lincolnshire RVC	Lincolnshire	White, changed to royal blue in 1946 and to blue in 1949
The Devonshire Regiment		11th (North Devon) Regiment of Foot (2 battalions)	1st or East Devon Militia; 2nd or South Devon Militia	1st Devonshire (Exeter and South Devon) RVC; 2nd Devonshire (Prince of Wales's) RVC; 3rd Devonshire RVC; 4th Devonshire RVC; 5th Devonshire RVC	Devon	White, changed to Lincoln green in 1905
The Suffolk Regiment		12th (East Suffolk) Regiment of Foot (2 battalions)	West Suffolk Militia; Cambridgeshire Militia	1st Suffolk RVC; 6th Suffolk (West Suffolk) RVC; 1st Cambridgeshire (Cambridge, Essex and Huntingdonshire) RVC; 2nd Cambridgeshire (Cambridge University) RVC	Cambridgeshire and Suffolk, also Huntingdonshire until 1900 (Note: Huntingdonshire was originally included in the regimental district of the Suffolk Regiment. There were no volunteer units recruited in the county from 1889 until 1900, when the 4th (Huntingdonshire) Volunteer Battalion, The Bedfordshire Regiment was formed. In 1908, it became part of the 5th Battalion of the Bedfords. In 1914, the Huntingdonshire companies were transferred to a newly formed Huntingdonshire Cyclist Battalion, affiliated to The Northamptonshire Regiment. The successors to the cyclist unit continued to be part of the Northamptons.)	White, changed to yellow in 1899
Prince Albert's Light Infantry (Somersetshire Regiment)	1882: The Prince Albert's (Somersetshire Light Infantry); 1912: Prince Albert's (Somerset Light Infantry); 1921: The Somerset Light Infantry (Prince Albert's)	13th (1st Somersetshire) (Prince Albert's Light Infantry) Regiment of Foot (2 battalions)	1st Somersetshire Light Infantry Militia; 2nd Somersetshire Light Infantry Militia	1st Somersetshire RVC; 2nd Somersetshire RVC; 3rd Somersetshire RVC	Somerset	Blue
The Prince of Wales's Own (West Yorkshire Regiment)	1921: The West Yorkshire Regiment (The Prince of Wales's Own)	14th (Buckinghamshire) (Prince of Wales's Own) Regiment of Foot (2 battalions)	2nd West York Light Infantry Militia; 4th West York Militia	1st Yorkshire, West Riding RVC; 3rd Yorkshire, West Riding RVC; 7th Yorkshire, West Riding RVC	Part of the West Riding of Yorkshire (including Bradford, Harrogate, Leeds and Ripon) and the county and city of York	White, changed to buff in 1900
The East Yorkshire Regiment	1935: The East Yorkshire Regiment (The Duke of York's Own)	15th (York, East Riding) Regiment of Foot (2 battalions)	East York Militia	1st Yorkshire, East Riding, RVC; 2nd Yorkshire, East Riding, RVC	East Riding of Yorkshire	White
The Bedfordshire Regiment	1919: The Bedfordshire and Hertfordshire Regiment	16th (Bedfordshire) Regiment of Foot (2 battalions)	Bedfordshire Light Infantry Militia; Hertfordshire Militia	1st Hertfordshire RVC 2nd Hertfordshire RVC; 1st Bedfordshire RVC	Bedfordshire and Hertfordshire; also Huntingdonshire 1900 - 1908	White
The Leicestershire Regiment	1946: The Royal Leicestershire Regiment	17th (Leicestershire) Regiment of Foot (2 battalions)	Leicestershire Militia	1st Leicestershire RVC	Leicestershire and Rutland	White, changed to pearl grey in 1931
The Royal Irish Regiment	Disbanded 1922	18th (The Royal Irish) Regiment of Foot (2 battalions)	Wexford Militia 2nd or North Tipperary Light Infantry Militia; Kilkenny Fusiliers Militia	N/A	County Kilkenny, County Tipperary, County Waterford and County Wexford	Blue
The Princess of Wales's Own (Yorkshire Regiment)	1902: Alexandra, Princess of Wales's Own (Yorkshire Regiment) 1921: The Green Howards (Alexandra, Princess of Wales's Own Yorkshire Regiment)	19th (1st York, North Riding) (Princess of Wales's Own) Regiment of Foot (2 battalions)	5th West York Militia North York Rifles	1st Yorkshire (North Riding) RVC 2nd Yorkshire (North Riding) RVC	North Riding of Yorkshire	White, changed to grass green in 1899
The Lancashire Fusiliers		20th (East Devonshire) Regiment of Foot (2 battalions)	7th Royal Lancashire Militia	8th Lancashire RVC; 12th Lancashire RVC	part of Lancashire (including Bury, Middleton, Radcliffe, Rochdale and Salford)	White
The Royal Scots Fusiliers		21st (Royal Scots Fusiliers) Regiment of Foot (2 battalions)	Dumfries, Roxburgh, Kirkcudbright and Selkirk (Scottish Borderers) Militia (Note: Transferred to the King's Own Scottish Borderers in 1887); Royal Ayrshire and Wigton Rifles (The Prince Regent's Own)	1st Ayrshire RVC 2nd Ayrshire RVC	Ayrshire, Kirkcudbrightshire and Wigtownshire, also Dumfriesshire, Roxburghshire and Selkirkshire until 1887*	Blue
The Cheshire Regiment		22nd (Cheshire) Regiment of Foot (2 battalions)	1st Royal Cheshire Light Infantry Militia 2nd Royal Cheshire Militia	1st Cheshire RVC; 2nd (Earl of Chester's) Cheshire RVC; 3rd Cheshire RVC; 4th Cheshire (Cheshire and Derbyshire) RVC; 5th Cheshire RVC	Cheshire	White, changed to buff in 1904
The Royal Welsh Fusiliers	1920: The Royal Welch Fusiliers	23rd (Royal Welsh Fusiliers) Regiment of Foot (2 battalions)	Royal Denbigh and Merioneth Rifles; Royal Carnarvon Rifle Corps	1st Denbighshire RVC; 1st Flintshire and Carnarvonshire RVC	Anglesey, Carnarvonshire, Denbighshire, Flintshire and Merionethshire, also Montgomeryshire from 1908. (Note: With the creation of the Territorial Force in 1908, Radnorshire was included in the regimental district of the King's Shropshire Light Infantry, and Montgomeryshire in that of the Royal Welsh Fusiliers)	Blue
The South Wales Borderers		24th (2nd Warwickshire) Regiment of Foot (2 battalions)	Royal South Wales Borderers Militia (Royal Radnor and Brecknock Rifles); Royal Montgomery Rifles	1st Brecknockshire RVC; 1st Monmouthshire RVC; 2nd Monmouthshire RVC; 3rd Monmouthshire RVC; 1st Montgomeryshire RVC	Brecknockshire and Monmouthshire, also Montgomeryshire and Radnorshire until 1908.	White, changed to grass green in 1905
The King's Own Borderers	1887: The King's Own Scottish Borderers	25th (King's Own Borderers) Regiment of Foot (2 battalions)	Transferred from the Royal Scots Fusiliers in 1887: Dumfries, Roxburgh, Kirkcudbright and Selkirk (Scottish Borderers) Militia	Transferred from the Royal Scots in 1887: 1st Roxburgh and Selkirk (The Border) RVC; 1st Berwickshire RVC; Transferred from the Royal Scots Fusiliers in 1877: 1st Dumfriesshire RVC; The Galloway RVC	Originally to have been part of the West Riding of Yorkshire, but no regimental district formed in 1881. In 1887 a regimental district was formed comprising Berwickshire, Dumfriesshire, Roxburghshire and Selkirkshire by transferring areas from the Royal Scots and Royal Scots Fusiliers.	Blue
The Cameronians (Scotch Rifles)	1881: The Cameronians (Scottish Rifles)	26th (Cameronian) Regiment of Foot 90th (Perthshire Volunteers) (Light Infantry) Regiment of Foot	2nd Royal Lanark Militia (2 battalions)	1st Lanarkshire (or Glasgow 1st Western) RVC; 2nd Lanarkshire RVC; 3rd Lanarkshire (or Glasgow 1st Southern) RVC; 4th Lanarkshire (or Glasgow 1st Northern) RVC; 7th Lanarkshire RVC	Part of Lanarkshire (including Hamilton, Motherwell and parts of Glasgow)	Rifle green faced dark green
The Royal Inniskilling Fusiliers		27th (Inniskilling) Regiment of Foot; 108th (Madras Infantry) Regiment of Foot	Fermanagh Light Infantry Militia; Royal Tyrone Fusiliers Militia; Londonderry Light Infantry Militia; The Prince of Wales's Own Donegal Militia	N/A	County Donegal (until 1922), County Fermanagh, County Londonderry, County Tyrone‡	Blue
The Gloucestershire Regiment		28th (North Gloucestershire) Regiment of Foot; 61st (South Gloucestershire) Regiment of Foot	Royal South Gloucestershire Light Infantry Militia; Royal North Gloucestershire Militia	1st Gloucestershire (City of Bristol) RVC; 2nd Gloucestershire RVC	Gloucestershire	White, changed to primrose yellow in 1929
The Worcestershire Regiment		29th (Worcestershire) Regiment of Foot; 36th (Herefordshire) Regiment of Foot	1st Worcestershire Militia; 2nd Worcestershire Militia	1st Worcestershire RVC; 2nd Worcestershire RVC	Worcestershire	White, changed to grass green in 1920 and to "grass green (emerald)" in 1924
The West Lancashire Regiment	1881: The East Lancashire Regiment	30th (Cambridgeshire) Regiment of Foot; 59th (2nd Nottinghamshire) Regiment of Foot	5th Royal Lancashire Militia	2nd Lancashire RVC; 3rd Lancashire RVC	Part of Lancashire (including Accrington, Blackburn, Burnley, Clitheroe and Darwen)	White
The East Surrey Regiment		31st (Huntingdonshire) Regiment of Foot 70th (Surrey) Regiment of Foot	1st Royal Surrey Militia 3rd Royal Surrey Militia	1st Surrey (South London) RVC 3rd Surrey RVC; 5th Surrey RVC; 7th Surrey RVC	Part of Surrey (including Camberwell, Kingston upon Thames, Richmond, Southwark and Wandsworth)	White
The Duke of Cornwall's Light Infantry		32nd (Cornwall) (Light Infantry) Regiment of Foot 46th (South Devonshire) Regiment of Foot	Royal Cornwall Rangers, Duke of Cornwall's Own Rifles	1st Cornwall RVC; 2nd Cornwall RVC	Cornwall	White
The Duke of Wellington's (West Riding Regiment)	1921: The Duke of Wellington's Regiment (West Riding)	33rd (Duke of Wellington's Regiment) Regiment of Foot 76th Regiment of Foot	6th West York Militia (2 battalions)	4th Yorkshire, West Riding RVC 6th Yorkshire, West Riding RVC; 9th Yorkshire, West Riding RVC	Part of the West Riding of Yorkshire (including Brighouse, Halifax, Huddersfield, Keighley and Skipton)	White, reverted to scarlet in 1905 (both 33rd & 76th were originally Scarlet)
The Border Regiment		34th (Cumberland) Regiment of Foot 55th (Westmoreland) Regiment of Foot	Royal Cumberland Militia Royal Westmoreland Light Infantry Militia	1st Cumberland RVC 1st Westmoreland RVC	Cumberland and Westmorland	White, changed to yellow in 1913
The Royal Sussex Regiment		35th (Royal Sussex) Regiment of Foot 107th (Bengal Infantry) Regiment of Foot	Royal Sussex Light Infantry Militia	1st Sussex RVC 2nd Sussex RVC; 1st Cinque Ports (Cinque Ports and Sussex) RVC	Sussex	Blue
The Hampshire Regiment	1946: The Royal Hampshire Regiment	37th (North Hampshire) Regiment of Foot 67th (South Hampshire) Regiment of Foot	Royal Hampshire Militia	1st Hampshire RVC 2nd Hampshire RVC; 3rd Hampshire RVC; 4th Hampshire RVC; 1st Isle of Wight RVC	Hampshire (including the Isle of Wight)	White, changed to yellow in 1904
The South Staffordshire Regiment		38th (1st Staffordshire) Regiment of Foot 80th (Staffordshire Volunteers) Regiment of Foot	(The King's Own) 1st Staffordshire Militia (2 battalions)	1st Staffordshire RVC 3rd Staffordshire RVC; 4th Staffordshire RVC	Part of Staffordshire (including Handsworth, Walsall, Wednesbury and Wolverhampton)	White, changed to yellow in 1936
The Dorsetshire Regiment	1951: The Dorset Regiment	39th (Dorsetshire) Regiment of Foot 54th (West Norfolk) Regiment of foot	Dorsetshire Militia	1st Dorsetshire RVC	Dorset	White, changed to grass green in 1904
The Prince of Wales's Volunteers (South Lancashire Regiment)	1938: The South Lancashire Regiment (The Prince of Wales's Volunteers)	40th (2nd Somersetshire) Regiment of foot 82nd (Prince of Wales's Volunteers) Regiment of Foot	4th Royal Lancashire (Duke of Lancaster's Own) Light Infantry Militia	9th Lancashire RVC 21st Lancashire RVC	Part of Lancashire (including St Helens and Warrington)	White, changed to buff in 1933
The Welsh Regiment	1920: The Welch Regiment	41st (The Welsh) Regiment of Foot 69th (South Lincolnshire) Regiment of Foot	Royal Glamorganshire Light Infantry Militia	1st Pembrokeshire (Pembroke, Carmarthen and Haverfordwest) RVC 1st Glamorganshire RVC; 2nd Glamorganshire RVC; 3rd Glamorganshire RVC	Carmarthenshire, Glamorgan and Pembrokeshire	White
The Black Watch (Royal Highlanders)	1934: The Black Watch (Royal Highland Regiment)	42nd (Royal Highland, The Black Watch) Regiment of Foot 73rd (Perthshire) Regiment of foot	Royal Perthshire Rifle Regiment of Militia	1st Forfarshire RVC 2nd Forfarshire (Forfarshire or Angus) RVC; 3rd Forfarshire (Dundee Highland) RVC; 1st Perthshire RVC; 2nd Perthshire (Perthshire Highland) RVC; 1st Fifeshire RVC	Fife, Forfarshire and Perthshire	Blue
The Oxfordshire Light Infantry	1908: The Oxfordshire and Buckinghamshire Light Infantry	43rd (Monmouthshire Light Infantry) Regiment of Foot 52nd (Oxfordshire) (Light Infantry) Regiment of Foot	Royal Bucks (King's Own) Militia Oxfordshire Militia	1st Oxfordshire (Oxford University) RVC 2nd Oxfordshire RVC; 1st Buckinghamshire RVC; 2nd Buckinghamshire (Eton College) RVC	Buckinghamshire and Oxfordshire	White
The Essex Regiment		44th (East Essex) Regiment of Foot 56th (West Essex) Regiment of Foot	Eastern Regiment of Essex Militia 1st or West Essex Militia	1st Essex RVC 2nd Essex RVC; 3rd Essex RVC; 4th Essex RVC	Essex	White, changed to purple in 1936
The Sherwood Foresters (Derbyshire Regiment)	1902: The Sherwood Foresters (Nottinghamshire and Derbyshire Regiment)	45th (Nottinghamshire) (Sherwood Foresters) Regiment of Foot 95th (Derbyshire) Regiment of Foot	1st Derbyshire Militia 2nd Derbyshire Militia (The Chatsworth Rifles); Royal Sherwood Foresters or Nottinghamshire Regiment of Militia	1st Derbyshire RVC 2nd Derbyshire RVC; 1st Nottinghamshire (Robin Hoods) RVC; 2nd Nottinghamshire RVC	Derbyshire and Nottinghamshire	White, changed to lincoln green in 1913
The Loyal North Lancashire Regiment	The Loyal Regiment (North Lancashire)	47th (Lancashire) Regiment of Foot 81st (Loyal Lincoln Volunteers) Regiment of Foot	3rd Duke of Lancaster's Own Royal Lancashire Militia (2 battalions)	11th Lancashire RVC 14th Lancashire RVC	Part of Lancashire (including Bolton, Chorley and Preston)	White
The Northamptonshire Regiment		48th (Northamptonshire) Regiment of Foot 58th (Rutlandshire) Regiment of Foot	Northampton and Rutland Militia	1st Northamptonshire RVC	Northamptonshire, plus Huntingdonshire from 1914	White, changed to buff in 1927
Princess Charlotte of Wales's (Berkshire Regiment)	1885: Princess Charlotte of Wales's (Royal Berkshire Regiment) 1921: The Royal Berkshire Regiment (Princess Charlotte of Wales's)	49th (Hertfordshire) (Princess Charlotte of Wales's) Regiment of Foot 66th (Berkshire) Regiment of Foot	Royal Berkshire Militia	1st Berkshire RVC	Berkshire	White, changed to blue in 1885
The Queen's Own (Royal West Kent Regiment)	1 January 1921: The Royal West Kent (Queen's Own) 16 April 1921: The Queen's Own Royal West Kent Regiment	50th (Queen's Own) Regiment of Foot 97th (Earl of Ulster's) Regiment of Foot	West Kent Light Infantry Militia	1st Kent RVC 3rd Kent (West Kent) RVC; 4th Kent (Royal Arsenal) RVC	Part of Kent (including Bromley, Maidstone, Tonbridge and Tunbridge Wells)	Blue
The King's Own Light Infantry (South Yorkshire Regiment)	1887: The King's Own (Yorkshire Light Infantry) 1921: The King's Own Yorkshire Light Infantry	51st (2nd Yorkshire, West Riding, King's Own Light Infantry) Regiment of Foot 105th (Madras Light Infantry) Regiment of Foot	1st West York Rifles Militia	3rd Yorkshire, West Riding RVC	Part of the West Riding of Yorkshire (including Batley, Castleford, Dewsbury, Doncaster, Goole, Pontefract and Wakefield)	Blue
The King's Light Infantry (Shropshire Regiment)	1882: The King's (Shropshire Light Infantry) 1921: The King's Shropshire Light Infantry	53rd (Shropshire) Regiment of Foot 85th (Bucks Volunteers) (King's Light Infantry) Regiment of Foot	Shropshire Militia Royal Herefordshire Militia	1st Shropshire RVC 2nd Shropshire RVC; 1st Herefordshire (Hereford and Radnor) RVC	Herefordshire and Shropshire, also Radnorshire from 1908	Blue
The Duke of Cambridge's Own (Middlesex Regiment)	1921: The Middlesex Regiment (Duke of Cambridge's Own)	57th (West Middlesex) Regiment of Foot 77th (East Middlesex) Regiment of Foot (The Duke of Cambridge's Own)	Royal Elthorne or 5th Middlesex Light Infantry Militia Royal East Middlesex Militia	3rd Middlesex RVC 8th Middlesex RVC; 1882: 11th Middlesex (Railway)RVC; 17th Middlesex RVC	Middlesex, except parts included in the regimental district of the Royal Fusiliers	White, changed to lemon yellow in 1902
The King's Royal Rifle Corps	1 January 1921: The King's Royal Rifles 10 February 1921: The King's Royal Rifle Corps	60th (King's Royal Rifle Corps) Regiment of Foot (4 battalions)	Huntingdonshire Rifles Militia Royal Flint Rifles Militia; 2nd Royal Rifle Regiment of Middlesex Militia; Carlow Rifles Militia; North Cork Rifles Militia	2nd Middlesex RVC (South Middlesex); 4th Middlesex RVC (West London); 5th Middlesex RVC; 6th Middlesex RVC (St George's) (amalgamated with 1st Middlesex RVC in 1892); 1st Middlesex RVC (Victoria Rifles); 12th Middlesex RVC (Civil Service); 13th Middlesex RVC (Queen's Westminsters); 21st Middlesex RVC (Finsbury Rifles); 22nd Middlesex RVC (Central London Rangers); 1st London VRC (City of London Volunteer Rifle Brigade); 2nd London RVC (City of London Rifles); 3rd City of London RVC; 1888: 26th Middlesex (Cyclist) RVC (to Rifle Brigade in 1889)	Recruited throughout United Kingdom (depot at Winchester)	Rifle green faced scarlet
The Duke of Edinburgh's (Wiltshire Regiment)	1921: The Wiltshire Regiment (Duke of Edinburgh's)	62nd (Wiltshire) Regiment of Foot 99th (Duke of Edinburgh's) Regiment of Foot	Royal Wiltshire Militia	1st Wiltshire RVC 2nd Wiltshire RVC	Wiltshire	White, changed to buff in 1905
The Manchester Regiment		63rd (West Suffolk) Regiment of Foot 96th Regiment of Foot	6th Royal Lancashire Militia (2 battalions)	4th Lancashire RVC 6th Lancashire (1st Manchester) RVC; 7th Lancashire RVC; 17th Lancashire RVC; 33rd Lancashire (2nd Manchester) RVC; 40th Lancashire (3rd Manchester) RVC	Part of Lancashire (including Ashton-under-Lyne, Manchester and Oldham)	White, changed to deep green in 1937
The Prince of Wales's (North Staffordshire Regiment)	1921: The North Staffordshire Regiment (Prince of Wales's)	64th (North Staffordshire) Regiment of Foot 98th (Prince of Wales's) Regiment of Foot	The King's Own (2nd Staffordshire) Light Infantry Militia The King's Own (3rd Staffordshire) Rifles Militia	2nd Staffordshire (Staffordshire Rangers) RVC 5th Staffordshire RVC	Part of Staffordshire (including Burton upon Trent, Stafford, Stoke-on-Trent and Tamworth)	White, changed to black in 1937
The York and Lancaster Regiment		65th (2nd Yorkshire, North Riding) Regiment of Foot 84th (York and Lancaster) Regiment of Foot	3rd West York Light Infantry Militia	2nd Yorkshire West Riding (Hallamshire) RVC 8th Yorkshire West Riding RVC	Part of the West Riding of Yorkshire (including Barnsley, Doncaster, Rotherham and Sheffield)	White
The Durham Light Infantry		68th (Durham) Regiment of Foot (Light Infantry) 106th Regiment of Foot (Bombay Light Infantry)	1st South Durham Militia 2nd North Durham Militia	1st Durham (Durham and North Riding of York) RVC 2nd Durham RVC; 3rd Durham (Sunderland) RVC; 4th Durham RVC; 5th Durham RVC	County Durham	White changed to dark green in 1903
The Highland Light Infantry	1923: The Highland Light Infantry (City of Glasgow Regiment)	71st (Highland) (light Infantry) Regiment of Foot 74th (Highlanders) Regiment of Foot	1st Royal Lanark Militia	5th Lanarkshire (Glasgow 2nd Northern) RVC 6th Lanarkshire RVC; 8th Lanarkshire (The Blythswood) RVC; 9th Lanarkshire RVC; 10th Lanarkshire (Glasgow Highland) RVC	Part of Lanarkshire (including Glasgow and Lanark)	Yellow, changed to buff in 1899
Seaforth Highlanders (Ross-shire Buffs)	1881: Seaforth Highlanders (Ross-shire Buffs, The Duke of Albany's) 1921: The Seaforth Highlanders (Ross-shire Buffs, The Duke of Albany's)	72nd (Duke of Albany's own Highlanders) Regiment of foot 78th (Highlanders) (Ross-shire Buffs) Regiment of Foot	Highland Rifles Militia (The militia regiment of the counties of Ross, Caithness, Sutherland and Cromarty)	1st Ross-shire (Ross Highland) RVC 1st Sutherland (The Sutherland Highland) RVC; 1st Elgin RVC	Caithness, Cromarty, Elginshire, Nairnshire, Orkney, Ross-shire and Sutherland	Yellow, changed to buff to 1899
The Gordon Highlanders		75th (Stirlingshire) Regiment of Foot 92nd (Gordon Highlanders) Regiment of Foot	Royal Aberdeenshire Highlanders Militia	1st Aberdeenshire RVC 2nd Aberdeenshire RVC; 3rd Aberdeenshire (The Buchan) RVC; 4th Aberdeenshire RVC; 1st Banffshire RVC; 1st Kincardineshire (Deeside Highland) RVC	Aberdeenshire, Banffshire and Kincardineshire, also Zetland from 1900	Yellow
The Queen's Own Cameron Highlanders		79th (Queen's Own Cameron Highlanders) Regiment of Foot 2nd battalion raised in 1897	Highland Light Infantry Militia	1st Inverness-shire (Inverness Highland) RVC	Inverness-shire	Blue
The Royal Irish Rifles	1922: The Royal Ulster Rifles	83rd (County of Dublin) Regiment of Foot 86th (Royal County Down) Regiment of Foot	Royal North Down Rifles Royal Antrim Rifles Militia; Royal South Down Light Infantry Militia; Royal Louth Rifles Militia	N/A	County Antrim and County Down, also County Louth until 1922	Rifle green faced light green, facings changed to dark green 1882
Princess Victoria's (Royal Irish Fusiliers)	1921: The Royal Irish Fusiliers (Princess Victoria's)	87th (Royal Irish Fusiliers) Regiment of Foot 89th (Princess Victoria's) Regiment of Foot	Armagh Light Infantry Militia Cavan Militia; Monaghan Militia	N/A	County Armagh plus County Cavan and County Monaghan until 1922 (Note: It was originally proposed to disband the Royal Irish Fusiliers during 1922. However, the 2nd battalion of that regiment and of the Royal Inniskilling Fusiliers were disbanded instead. During 1924, the two regiments formed a single "corps" sharing a depot and regimental district consisting of Counties Armagh, Fermanagh, Londonderry and Tyrone. In 1937, the regiments were again separated, with each forming a second battalion the next year.)	Blue
The Connaught Rangers	Disbanded 1922	88th (Connaught Rangers) Regiment of Foot 94th Regiment of Foot	South Mayo Rifles Militia Galway Militia; Roscommon Militia; North Mayo Fusiliers Militia	N/A	County Galway, County Leitrim, County Mayo and County Roscommon	Green
Princess Louises's (Sutherland and Argyll Highlanders)	1882: Princess Louises's (Argyll and Sutherland Highlanders) 1921: The Argyll and Sutherland Highlanders (Princess Louise's)	91st (Princess Louises's Argyllshire Highlanders) Regiment of Foot 93rd (Sutherland Highlanders) Regiment of Foot	Highland Borderers Light Infantry Militia (The militia regiment of the counties of Clackmannan, Dumbarton, Kinross and Stirling) Prince of Wales's Royal Regiment of Renfrew Militia	1st Renfrewshire RVC 2nd Renfrewshire RVC; 3rd Renfrewshire RVC; 1st Stirlingshire RVC; 1st Argyllshire RVC; 1st Dumbartonshire RVC; Clackmannanshire and Kinross RVC	Argyllshire, Buteshire, Dumbartonshire, Kinross-shire, Renfrewshire and Stirlingshire	Yellow
The Prince of Wales's Leinster Regiment (Royal Canadians)	Disbanded 1922	100th (Prince of Wales's Royal Canadian) Regiment of Foot 109th (Bombay Infantry) Regiment of Foot	King's County Royal Rifles Militia Royal Queen's County Rifles Militia; Royal Meath Militia	N/A	King's County, County Longford, County Meath, Queen's County, and County Westmeath	Blue
The Royal Munster Fusiliers	Disbanded 1922	101st (Royal Bengal Fusiliers) Regiment of Foot 104th (Bengal Fusiliers) Regiment of Foot	South Cork Light Infantry Militia Kerry Militia; Royal Limerick County Militia (Fusiliers)	N/A	County Clare, City of Cork, County Cork, County Kerry and County Limerick	Blue
The Royal Dublin Fusiliers	Disbanded 1922	102nd (Royal Madras Fusiliers) Regiment of Foot 103rd (Royal Bombay Fusiliers) Regiment of Foot	Kildare Rifles Militia Queen's Own Royal Dublin City Militia; Dublin County Light Infantry Militia	N/A	City of Dublin, County Dublin and County Kildare	Blue
The Prince Consort's Own (Rifle Brigade)	1921: The Rifle Brigade (Prince Consort's Own)	Rifle Brigade (Prince Consort's Own) (Note: The Rifle Brigade was originally the 95th Regiment of Foot. In 1816 the regiment ceased to have a number, taking precedence at the end of the line.) (4 battalions)	Queen's Own Royal Tower Hamlets Light Infantry Militia Prince of Wales's Royal Regiment of Longford Light Infantry Militia; King's Own Light Infantry Militia (a militia regiment of the Tower Hamlets); Leitrim Rifles Regiment of Militia; Westmeath Rifles Regiment of Militia	7th Middlesex (London Scottish) RVC 14th Middlesex (Inns of Court) RVC; 15th Middlesex (Customs and Docks) RVC; 16th Middlesex (London Irish Rifles) RVC; 18th Middlesex (Paddington Rifles) RVC; 19th Middlesex (St Giles's and St George's Bloomsbury) RVC; 20th Middlesex (Artists Rifles) RVC; 24th Middlesex (Post Office Rifles) RVC; 1st Tower Hamlets RVC; 2nd Tower Hamlets RVC; 1889: 26th Middlesex (Cyclist) RVC (attached to 14th Middlesex RVC)	Recruited throughout United Kingdom (depot at Winchester)	Rifle green faced black

== See also ==
- List of Regiments of Foot
- List of British Army regiments (1881)
- Cardwell Reforms
- Haldane Reforms
