= List of British Army regiments (1881) =

This is a list of British Army cavalry and infantry regiments that were created by Childers Reforms in 1881 - a continuation of the Cardwell Reforms - that gave each regiment two "line" battalions and two militia battalions. Existing two battalion regiments were renamed, while single battalion regiments were combined.

It also indicates the cavalry amalgamations that would take place forty years later as part of the Government cuts of the early 1920s.

== Cavalry ==
=== Household Cavalry ===
- 1st Life Guards
- 2nd Life Guards
- Royal Horse Guards (The Blues)

=== Cavalry of the Line ===
==== Dragoon Guards ====
- 1st King's Dragoon Guards
- 2nd Dragoon Guards (Queen's Bays)
- 3rd (Prince of Wales's) Dragoon Guards
- 4th Royal Irish Dragoon Guards
- 5th (Princess Charlotte of Wales's) Dragoon Guards
- Carabiniers (6th Dragoon Guards)
- 7th (The Princess Royal's) Dragoon Guards

==== Dragoons, Hussars and Lancers ====
- 1st (Royal) Dragoons
- 2nd Dragoons (Royal Scots Greys)
- 3rd (The King's Own) Hussars
- 4th (Queen's Own) Hussars
- 5th (Royal Irish) Lancers
- 6th (Inniskilling) Dragoons
- 7th Queen's Own Hussars
- 8th King's Royal Irish Hussars
- 9th Queen's Royal Lancers
- 10th Royal Hussars (Prince of Wales's Own)
- 11th Hussars (Prince Albert's Own)
- 12th (Prince of Wales's Royal) Lancers
- 13th Hussars
- 14th King's Hussars
- 15th The King's Hussars
- 16th The Queen's Lancers
- 17th Lancers (Duke of Cambridge's Own)
- 18th Hussars
- 19th Hussars
- 20th Hussars
- 21st Hussars (Lancers from 1897)

== Support arms ==
- Royal Regiment of Artillery
  - Royal Horse Artillery
- Corps of Royal Engineers

== Infantry ==
=== Foot Guards ===
- Grenadier Guards
- Coldstream Guards
- Scots Guards

=== Line Infantry (In order of precedence) ===
- Royal Scots (Lothian Regiment) - renaming of 1st (The Royal) Regiment of Foot
- Queen's (Royal West Surrey Regiment) - renaming of 2nd (The Queen's Royal) Regiment of Foot
- Buffs (East Kent Regiment) - renaming of 3rd (The East Kent) Regiment of Foot
- King's Own (Royal Lancaster Regiment)
  - 4th (The King's Own Royal) Regiment of Foot
- Northumberland Fusiliers - renaming of 5th Regiment of Foot (Northumberland Fusiliers)
- Royal Warwickshire Regiment
  - 6th (Royal 1st Warwickshire) Regiment of Foot
- Royal Fusiliers (City of London Regiment)
  - 7th (Derbyshire) Regiment of Foot
- King's (Liverpool Regiment)
  - 8th (The King's) Regiment of Foot
- Norfolk Regiment - Royal title in 1935 as part of Silver Jubilee, renaming of "9th (The East Norfolk) Regiment of Foot"
- The Lincolnshire Regiment - gained Royal title in 1946 for World War II service, renaming of 10th (The North Lincolnshire) Regiment of Foot
- Devonshire Regiment - renaming of 11th (The North Devonshire) Regiment of Foot
- Suffolk Regiment - renaming of 12th (The East Suffolk) Regiment of Foot
- Prince Albert's (Somersetshire Light Infantry)
  - 13th (1st Somersetshire)(Prince Albert's Light Infantry) Regiment of Foot
- Prince of Wales's Own (West Yorkshire Regiment)
  - 14th (Buckinghamshire, The Prince of Wales's Own) Regiment of Foot
- East Yorkshire Regiment
  - 15th (The Yorkshire East Riding) Regiment of Foot
- Bedfordshire Regiment - renaming of 16th (The Bedfordshire) Regiment of Foot
- Leicestershire Regiment - gained Royal title in 1946 for World War II service, renaming of 17th (The Leicestershire) Regiment of Foot
- The Royal Irish Regiment
  - 18th (The Royal Irish) Regiment of Foot
- Princess of Wales's Own (Yorkshire Regiment)
  - 19th (The 1st Yorkshire North Riding - Prince of Wales's Own) Regiment of Foot
- Lancashire Fusiliers - renaming of 20th (The East Devonshire) Regiment of Foot
- Royal Scots Fusiliers
  - 21st (Royal Scots Fusiliers) Regiment of Foot
- Cheshire Regiment
  - 22nd (The Cheshire) Regiment of Foot
- Royal Welsh Fusiliers - restored archaic spelling of Welsh (Welch) in 1921
  - 23rd Regiment of Foot (Royal Welsh Fusiliers)
- South Wales Borderers
  - 24th (The 2nd Warwickshire) Regiment of Foot
- The King's Own Borderers
  - 25th (King's Own Borderers) Regiment of Foot
- The Cameronians (Scotch Rifles)
  - 26th (The Cameronians) Regiment of Foot
  - 90th Regiment of Foot (Perthshire Volunteers) (Light Infantry)
- Royal Inniskilling Fusiliers
  - 27th (Inniskilling) Regiment of Foot
  - 108th Regiment of Foot (Madras Infantry)
- Gloucestershire Regiment
  - 28th (North Gloucestershire) Regiment of Foot
  - 61st (South Gloucestershire) Regiment of Foot
- Worcestershire Regiment
  - 29th (Worcestershire) Regiment of Foot
  - 36th (Herefordshire) Regiment of Foot
- East Lancashire Regiment
  - 30th (Cambridgeshire) Regiment of Foot
  - 59th (2nd Nottinghamshire) Regiment of Foot
- East Surrey Regiment
  - 31st (Huntingdonshire) Regiment of Foot
  - 70th (Surrey) Regiment of Foot
- Duke of Cornwall's Light Infantry
  - 32nd (Cornwall Light Infantry) Regiment of Foot
  - 46th (South Devonshire) Regiment of Foot
- Duke of Wellington's (West Riding Regiment)
  - 33rd (The Duke of Wellington's) Regiment of Foot
  - 76th Regiment of Foot
- Border Regiment
  - 34th (Cumberland) Regiment of Foot
  - 55th (Westmorland) Regiment of Foot
- Royal Sussex Regiment
  - 35th (Royal Sussex) Regiment of Foot
  - 107th Regiment of Foot (Bengal Light Infantry)
- Hampshire Regiment - gained Royal title in 1946 for World War II service
  - 37th (North Hampshire) Regiment of Foot
  - 67th (South Hampshire) Regiment of Foot
- South Staffordshire Regiment
  - 38th (1st Staffordshire) Regiment of Foot
  - 80th (Staffordshire Volunteers) Regiment of Foot
- Dorsetshire Regiment
  - 39th (Dorsetshire) Regiment of Foot
  - 54th (West Norfolk) Regiment of Foot
- Prince of Wales's Volunteers (South Lancashire Regiment)
  - 40th (2nd Somersetshire) Regiment of Foot
  - 82nd (The Prince of Wales's Volunteers) Regiment of Foot
- Welsh Regiment
  - 41st (The Welsh) Regiment of Foot
  - 69th (South Lincolnshire) Regiment of Foot
- Black Watch (Royal Highlanders)
  - 42nd (Royal Highland) Regiment of Foot, The Black Watch
  - 73rd (Perthshire) Regiment of Foot
- Oxfordshire Light Infantry
  - 43rd (Monmouthshire) Regiment of Foot
  - 52nd (Oxfordshire) Regiment of Foot
- Essex Regiment
  - 44th (East Essex) Regiment of Foot
  - 56th (West Essex) Regiment of Foot
- Sherwood Foresters (Derbyshire Regiment)
  - 45th (Nottinghamshire) Regiment of Foot
  - 95th (Derbyshire) Regiment of Foot
- Loyal North Lancashire Regiment
  - 47th (The Lancashire) Regiment of Foot
  - 81st (Loyal Lincoln Volunteers) Regiment of Foot
- Northamptonshire Regiment
  - 48th (The Northamptonshire) Regiment of Foot
  - 58th (Rutlandshire) Regiment of Foot
- Princess Charlotte of Wales's (Berkshire Regiment)
  - 49th (Princess Charlotte of Wales's) (Hertfordshire) Regiment of Foot
  - 66th (Berkshire) Regiment of Foot
- Queen's Own (Royal West Kent Regiment)
  - 50th (The Queen's Own) Regiment of Foot
  - 97th (The Earl of Ulster's) Regiment of Foot
- The King's Own Light Infantry (South Yorkshire Regiment)
  - 51st Regiment of Foot (King's Own Light Infantry)
  - 105th Regiment of Foot (Madras Light Infantry)
- The King's Light Infantry (Shropshire Regiment)
  - 53rd (The Shropshire) Regiment of Foot
  - 85th (The King's Light Infantry) Regiment of Foot
- The (Duke of Cambridge's Own) Middlesex Regiment
  - 57th (The West Middlesex) Regiment of Foot
  - 77th (The East Middlesex) Regiment of Foot
- King's Royal Rifle Corps
  - 60th (The King's Royal Rifle Corps) Regiment of Foot
- The (Duke of Edinburgh's) Wiltshire Regiment
  - 62nd (Wiltshire) Regiment of Foot
  - 99th Duke of Edinburgh's (Lanarkshire) Regiment of Foot
- Manchester Regiment
  - 63rd (The West Suffolk) Regiment of Foot
  - 96th Regiment of Foot
- The (Prince of Wales's) North Staffordshire Regiment
  - 64th (2nd Staffordshire) Regiment of Foot
  - 98th (The Prince of Wales's) Regiment of Foot
- The York and Lancaster Regiment
  - 65th (2nd Yorkshire, North Riding) Regiment of Foot
  - 84th (York and Lancaster) Regiment of Foot
- Durham Light Infantry
  - 68th (Durham) Regiment of Foot (Light Infantry)
  - 106th Regiment of Foot (Bombay Light Infantry)
- Highland Light Infantry
  - 71st (Highland) Regiment of Foot (Light Infantry)
  - 74th (Highland) Regiment of Foot
- Seaforth Highlanders (Duke of Albany's/Ross-shire Buffs)
  - 72nd (Duke of Albany's Own Highlanders) Regiment of Foot
  - 78th (Highlanders) Regiment of Foot (The Ross-shire Buffs)
- Gordon Highlanders
  - 75th (Stirlingshire) Regiment of Foot
  - 92nd (Gordon Highlanders) Regiment of Foot
- Queen's Own Cameron Highlanders
  - 79th (The Queen's Own Cameron Highlanders) Regiment of Foot
- Royal Irish Rifles
  - 83rd (County of Dublin) Regiment of Foot
  - 86th (Royal County Down) Regiment of Foot
- Princess Victoria's (Royal Irish Fusiliers)
  - 87th (Royal Irish Fusiliers) Regiment of Foot
  - 89th (The Princess Victoria's) Regiment of Foot
- Connaught Rangers
  - 88th Regiment of Foot (Connaught Rangers)
  - 94th Regiment of Foot
- Princess Louise's (Argyll and Sutherland Highlanders)
  - 91st (Princess Louise's Argyllshire) Regiment of Foot
  - 93rd (Sutherland Highlanders) Regiment of Foot
- Prince of Wales's Leinster Regiment (Royal Canadians)
  - 100th (Prince of Wales's Royal Canadians) Regiment of Foot
  - 109th Regiment of Foot (Bombay Infantry)
- Royal Munster Fusiliers
  - 101st Regiment of Foot (Royal Bengal Fusiliers)
  - 104th Regiment of Foot (Bengal Fusiliers)
- Royal Dublin Fusiliers
  - 102nd Regiment of Foot (Royal Madras Fusiliers)
  - 103rd Regiment of Foot (Royal Bombay Fusiliers)
- The Prince Consort's Own Rifle Brigade
- 1st West India Regiment - merged with 2nd in 1881 to form single West Indian Regiment
- 2nd West India Regiment

== Services ==
- Commissariat and Transport Corps (later becoming Royal Army Service Corps in 1888)
- Army Hospital Corps
- Army Ordnance Corps
- Corps of Military Mounted Police
- Corps of Army Schoolmasters
- Army Chaplains' Department
- Army Pay Department
- Army Veterinary Department
- Army Nursing Service

== See also ==
- British Army order of precedence
