= John Banks =

John Banks or Bankes may refer to:

== Politics and law ==
- Sir John Banks, 1st Baronet (1627–1699), English merchant and Member of Parliament
- John Banks (American politician) (1793–1864), U.S. Representative from Pennsylvania
- John Gray Banks (1888–1961), politician in Canada
- John Banks (activist) (1915–2010), English political activist and writer
- John Banks (New Zealand politician) (born 1946), New Zealand politician
- Sir John Bankes (1589–1644), Attorney General and Chief Justice to King Charles I of England
- John Bankes (judge) (1854–1947), English judge
- John Bankes (died 1772), British politician
- John Eldon Bankes (1854–1946), Welsh judge
- John Garnett Banks (1889–1974), Scottish businessman and local politician
- John Bankes (died 1714), Member of Parliament 1698–1714 for Corfe Castle
- John W. Banks (1867–1958), justice of the Connecticut Supreme Court

== Sport ==
- John Banks (cricketer) (1903–1979), New Zealand cricketer
- John Banks (motorcyclist), British motocross racer
- John Banks (baseball) (1922–2011), Negro league baseball player
- John Banks (footballer) (1875–1947), English footballer
- Johnny Banks (1861–?), American boxer

== Others ==
- John Banks (playwright) (died 1706), English playwright of the Restoration era
- John Banks (East India Company officer) (1811–1857), British officer
- John Thomas Banks (1816–1908), Anglo-Irish physician
- John Banks (drummer) (1943–1988), drummer for The Merseybeats
- John Banks (mercenary recruiter) (born 1945), British mercenary recruiter

== See also ==
- John Bancks (1709–1751), writer
- Jonathan Banks (born 1947), American character actor
