= Henry Bankes (died 1776) =

British lawyer and politician

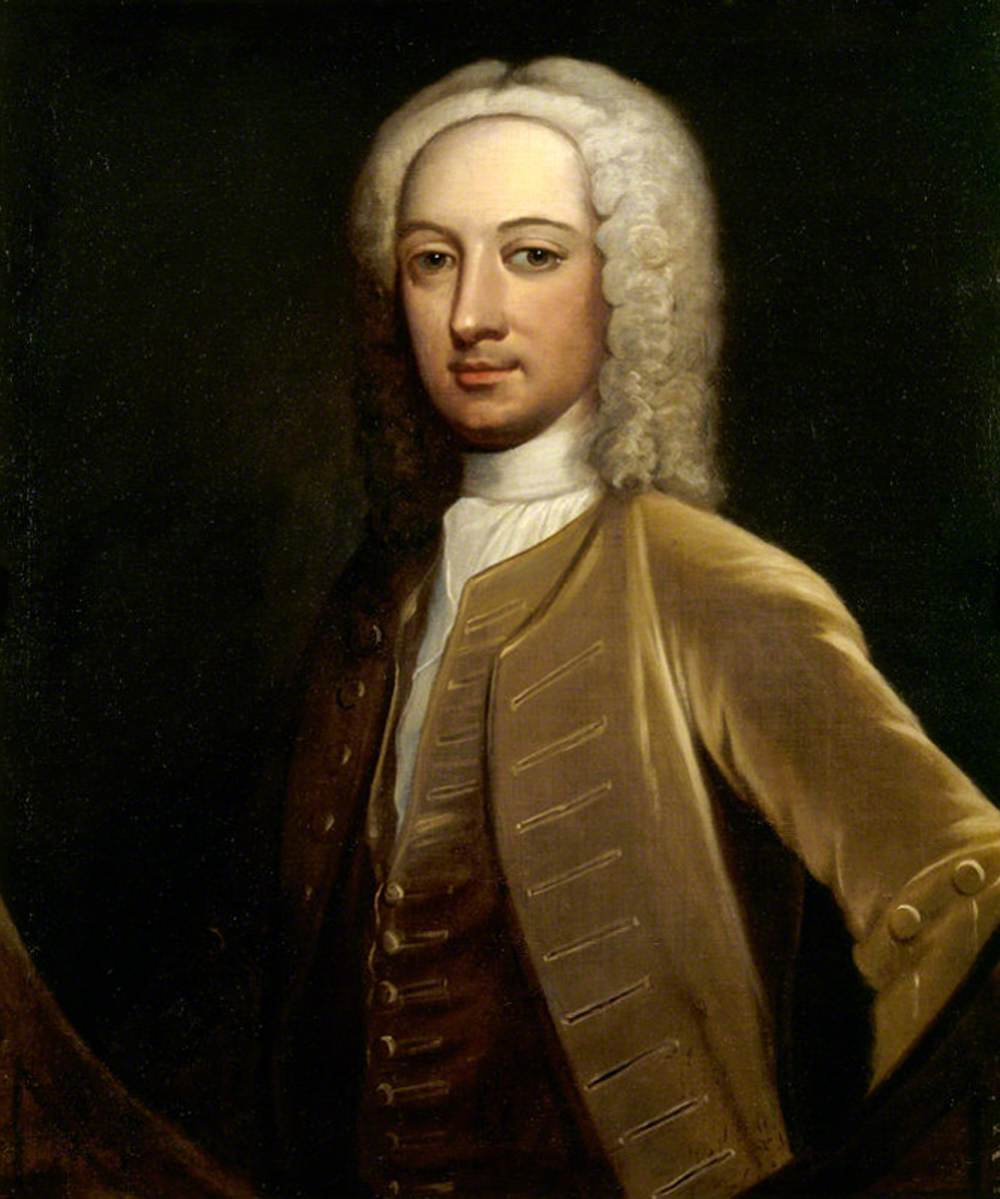
Henry Bankes, portrait by George Dowdney

Henry Bankes (1698/1700 – 23 September 1776) was a British lawyer and politician, who served as Member of Parliament for Corfe Castle.

== Life ==
Bankes was the son of John Bankes MP and his wife Margaret, daughter of Sir Henry Parker Bt MP. He was born in 1698 or 1700 (baptised 2 November 1700).

He was educated at Eton College and King's College, Cambridge (B.A. 1724, M.A. 1728, Fellow 1723–29). He was admitted to Lincoln's Inn in 1720, and called to the bar in 1726.

Bankes was King's Counsel to the Duchy of Lancaster 1738–61, and deputy chief justice of the South Wales circuit 1745–49.

Corfe Castle was a family seat, which Bankes' grandfather, father, and brother John Bankes MP had represented. At the 1741 general election, John stood aside for Henry, who was elected unopposed. He was re-elected unopposed in 1747, 1754 and 1761. Henry was initially a Tory opponent of the government, consistently voting against the government in his first parliament. However, he was made King's Counsel in 1747 on the recommendation of Lord Gower, another ex-Tory convert to the government, and thereafter acted with the government. Bankes stood down from parliament in 1762, to accept appointment as a Commissioner of HM Customs.

== Family ==
Bankes married firstly, on 30 December 1738, Eleanor Symonds, daughter of Richard Symonds of London. They had no children.

Bankes married secondly, on 11 June 1753, Margaret Wynne, daughter of John Wynne, Bishop of Bath and Wells. They had three children:

- John Bankes (1756–1766)
- Henry Bankes MP (1757–1834)
- Anne Bankes (1759–1778)

Parliament of Great Britain
Preceded by John Bankes; John Bond	Member of Parliament for Corfe Castle; 1741–1762; With: John Bond 1741–1744; Thomas Erle Drax 1744–1747; John Bond 1747–1761; Viscount Malpas 1761–1762	Succeeded by Viscount Malpas; John Campbell
