= Dackombe =

Dackombe is a surname. Notable people with the surname include:

- Edward Dackombe (1579–1635), English politician
- John Dackombe (1570–1618), English politician

== See also ==
- Daccombe
