= John Clavell (MP) =

English politician (1541–1609)

Member of Parliament for Corfe Castle
- In office 1584–1585 Serving with Francis Hawley
- Preceded by: Edmund Uvedale
- Succeeded by: William Hatton

Personal details
- Born: 2 May 1541
- Died: 5 January 1609 (aged 67)
- Resting place: St Peter's Church, Church Knowle
- Education: Winchester College

John Clavell (2 May 1541 – 5 January 1609) was an English politician in the 16th century.
