= John Tregonwell (died 1682) =

English politician (1632–1682)

John Tregonwell (3 September 1632 – February 1682) of Anderson Manor, Dorset was an English politician who sat in the House of Commons between 1659 and 1679.

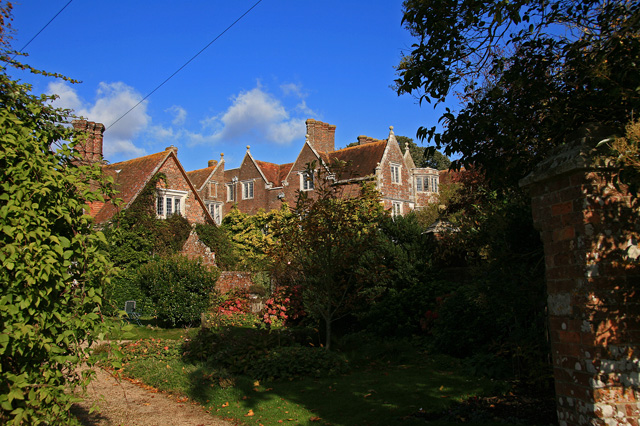
Anderson Manor, Dorset today

Tregonwell was the son of Thomas Tregonwell of Anderson, Dorset, and his wife Dorothy Hastings, daughter of Hon. Henry Hastings of Woodlands, Dorset and widow of Sir John Ryves of Damory Court, Dorset. He succeeded to Anderson on the death of his father in 1655. In 1659, he was elected Member of Parliament for Corfe Castle in the Third Protectorate Parliament. He became J.P. for Dorset in March 1660 and remained on the commission until his death.

In April 1660, Tregonwell was re-elected MP for Corfe Castle for the Convention Parliament. He was commissioner for assessment for Dorset from August 1660 until 1680. He was one of those proposed for the order Knight of the Royal Oak with an estate with an annual income of £1,100. In 1661 he was re-elected MP for Corfe Castle in the Cavalier Parliament. A major concern of his in parliament was to obtain an act allowing him to sell part of the Ebuty estate. He was commissioner for the foreshore, Dorset in 1662. He became Deputy Lieutenant in 1670. He was commissioner for assessment for Westminster from 1673 to 1680. In 1675 he was commissioner for recusants. In 1679 he was re-elected MP for Corfe Castle in the First Exclusion Parliament.

Tregonwell died intestate in London in at the age of 49. He had married firstly Anne Lewis, daughter of Sir Edward Lewis of Edington, Wiltshire, but had no issue. He married secondly by licence dated 18 February 1665, Elizabeth Fane, daughter of Sir George Fane of Burston, Kent, and had no children. His third wife whom he married by licence dated 15 February 1666, was Mary Davies, widow of Alexander Davies, scrivener of Ebury, Middlesex, and daughter of Richard Dukeson, DD, Rector of St. Clement Danes, Middlesex. They had a son and four daughters.

Parliament of England
| Preceded by Not represented in Second Protectorate Parliament | Member of Parliament for Corfe Castle; 1659; With: Sir Ralph Bankes | Succeeded by Not represented in Restored Rump |
| Preceded by Not represented in Restored Rump | Member of Parliament for Corfe Castle; 1660–1679; With: Sir Ralph Bankes; Viscount Latimer; Viscount Osborne; Sir Nathaniel Napier | Succeeded by Sir Nathaniel Napier; Nathaniel Bond |
