= Peter Osborne (1584–1653) =

English administrator and Member of Parliament

Sir Peter Osborne (1584 – 14 April 1653), of Chicksands in Bedfordshire, was an English administrator and Member of Parliament, who was Royal Governor of Guernsey during the English Civil War.

== Biography ==
Osborne was the eldest son of Sir John Osborne (1552–1628) and grandson of Peter Osborne (1521–1592), who had been Keeper of the Privy Purse to King Edward VI, and who had been granted the office of Lord Treasurer's Remembrancer to himself and his heirs. Francis Osborne, the well-known writer, was Sir Peter's younger brother. Sir Peter was knighted in 1611, and married Dorothy Danvers. Through the influence of her brother, the Earl of Danby, he was appointed Lieutenant-Governor of Guernsey in 1621 with a reversion on the governorship in the event of Danby's death. He also served in James I's fourth and last parliament (the Happy Parliament in 1624) and Charles I's first parliament (the Useless Parliament in 1625), representing Corfe Castle, and after his father's death in 1628 also inherited his lucrative position in the Exchequer.

On Guernsey, Sir Peter was active with his brother-in-law in reinforcing the island against the threat of invasion from France; however, the cost of these soldiers fell on the islanders, occasioning considerable unrest, to which Osborne reacted by attempting to impose martial law in 1628. Parry noted that

He took no pains to make himself loved by the inhabitants of Guernsey. He disliked and distrusted their religious and political principles, and expressed his opinions openly.

These grievances probably played a part in Guernsey's decision to declare for Parliament on the outbreak of the civil war, but Osborne remained loyal to the King, holding the impregnable Castle Cornet for the royal cause against constant siege. The castle was strategically priceless, commanding the entrance to St Peter Port harbour and reinforcing the still Royalist Jersey.

In 1644, on Danby's death, Osborne inherited the position of Governor. He remained at Cornet Castle until 1646 when with the military phase of the war in England over, he appointed Sir Baldwin Wake as lieutenant-governor and handed over the fortress to him. Wake continued to hold the castle until October 1651 when he surrendered it to Parliamentary forces.

Osborne seems first to have retired abroad, living in St Malo while his property was sequestered by Parliament, but later he returned, poverty-stricken, to Chicksands, where he died in 1653. However, the family's fortunes were restored at the Restoration, and his eldest son, John, was created a baronet in 1662.

== Family ==
By his wife Dorothy, daughter of John Danvers Osborne had eight sons and four daughters. One of his daughters, Dorothy, married Sir William Temple, and is well known for her charming "Letters", which were edited by Judge Parry in 1888.

His eldest son, Sir John Osborne (1615–1698), had a new grant of the office of remembrancer to the lord-treasurer, was a gentleman of the privy chamber to Charles II, was created a baronet 11 February 1661, and died 6 February 1698.

== Notes ==
Parliament of England
Preceded by Sir Thomas Hatton; Sir Thomas Hammond	Member of Parliament for Corfe Castle; 1624–1625; With: Sir Francis Nethersale	Succeeded by Edward Dackombe; Sir Robert Napier
Honorary titles
Preceded by The Earl of Danby	Governor of Guernsey; 1644–1649	Succeeded by Lord Percy of Alnwick
