= Charles Mathew (Corfe Castle MP) =

English politician

Member of Parliament for Corfe Castle
- In office 1572–1581 Serving with Edmund Uvedale
- Preceded by: unknown
- Succeeded by: Francis Hawley

Charles Mathew was an English politician in the 16th century.
