= Wessex Regionalists =

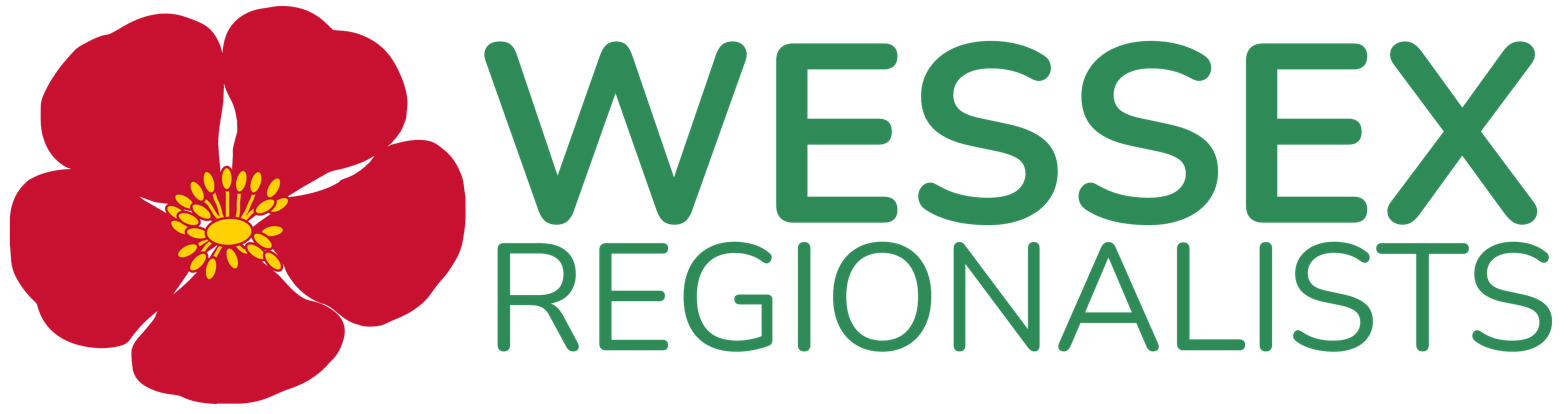
- President: Nick Xylas
- Secretary-General: George Wright
- Governing body: WR Council
- Founded: 1974
- Headquarters: 18 Quaker Court, St John Street, Thornbury, Bristol BS35 2NY
- Membership (2021): 21
- Ideology: Wessex regionalism Agrarianism
- Colours: Sea green Red Gold

Website
- wessexregionalists.org

The Wessex Regionalists is a minor English regionalist political party in the United Kingdom. It seeks a degree of legislative and administrative home rule for Wessex, an area in the south and south-west of England based loosely on the Anglo-Saxon kingdom of the same name.

The party has contested a small number of Wessex-area parliamentary constituencies in most elections since it was established, but without success.

== History ==
Speaking at a tourism industry conference in 1969, the then Viscount Weymouth suggested Wessex as a regional identity for tourism purposes. He later wrote letters to the press, objecting to Wessex not being given the same opportunities as Scotland or Wales in the Kilbrandon Report. Lord Weymouth subsequently stood as the first Wessex Regionalist parliamentary candidate for Westbury in the February 1974 general election, coming last with 521 votes.

In May 1980, the Wessex Regionalists along with the Campaign for the North, Cowethas Flamank, Mebyon Kernow, the Orkney Movement and the Shetland Movement signed the Declaration of Oxford at the first Regionalist Seminar. It read:

"We, the signatories of this Declaration, representing various movements for autonomy, declare that we are joined together in determined support for the right to self-government communities and nations within Britain and against the centralism of the Westminster government."

— Declaration of Oxford

The former were later joined by the Movement for Middle England.

The party was formally constituted in 1981. It initially used Thomas Hardy's definition of Wessex as Berkshire, Hampshire, Wiltshire, Somerset, Dorset and Devon; but later added Oxfordshire and Gloucestershire. It pulled out of the 1987 general election and advocated that its supporters voted for the Liberal/SDP Alliance on the basis that they were a close second in many Wessex seats and were the most supportive of regional government.

Lord Weymouth (who succeeded as The 7th Marquess of Bath in June 1992) was the first president of the party, later defecting to the Liberal Democrats although in 1999 he was "still in touch" with the Wessex Regionalists. Subsequent presidents have included the activist John Banks and the former architect Colin Bex. In 2010, during his term as President, Bex advocated for a 100% tax rate on the top 10% of earners, with the revenue passed to parish councils.

In 2013, Dorset County Councillor David C. Fox switched his party allegiance from Liberal Democrat to Wessex Regionalist days before the 2013 Dorset County Council election; he did not seek re-election.

During the 2015 general election, then-leader Colin Bex cast doubt on the official version of events of the 2001 September 11 attacks. During the UK's 2016 referendum on membership of the European Union, Bex campaigned to leave. He described immigration as a "peaceful invasion", describing "people from all over the world" as "infiltrating" national institutions. Bex was replaced as leader by Jim Gunter, who stood as candidate for the Devizes constituency: at a hustings shortly before the 2017 general election, Gunter advocated for a second referendum on Brexit and, if that were not possible, the "Norway option" of remaining in the single market.

In the 2024 general election, the Regionalists endorsed the campaign of independent candidate George Wright, standing in the constituency of Maidenhead. Wright received 791 votes, a 1.6% share. In 2025, he wrote to the Maidenhead Advertiser that he had become an active member of the party, and argued for a confederal model for Europe as opposed to the "quasi-federal" status quo involving Article 50.

In April 2026, James Crabb was put forward as candidate for Hampshire County Council in Winchester Eastgate, campaigning for "better scrutiny of the infrastructural and ecological effects of urban development", and questioning the government's approach to local government reorganisation. Crabb placed 6th of 6 candidates, with 49 votes.

At the 2026 Autumn Budget, the government confirmed it would be proceeding with the creation of the Wessex Mayoral Strategic Authority, covering Dorset Council, Bournemouth, Christchurch and Poole Council, Somerset Council, North Somerset Council and Wiltshire Council. In response, party president Jim Gunter wrote a letter in the Salisbury Journal criticising the proposal and calling for "a parliament with powers comparable to the devolved administrations in Scotland, Wales and Northern Ireland."

== Ideology ==
Wessex as defined by the Wessex Regionalists

Associate Professor Bonnie M. Meguid labelled the Wessex Regionalists, alongside other pro-devolution parties, as "ethnoterritorial," though an earlier study of regionalist and nationalist parties in Britain reached the opposite conclusion, saying that "For regionalism, the legitimacy of the state as a whole is not usually in question; the challenge is to its territorial organisation. This is in contrast to ethnic nationalism (for example, that advocated for Wales), which suggests that the state is not legitimate because it contains different nations." Its platform is based on the creation of a devolved assembly for the region it defines as Wessex. The party defines the counties of Berkshire, Devon, Dorset, Gloucestershire, Hampshire, the Isle of Wight, Oxfordshire, Somerset, and Wiltshire as being part of Wessex. Whilst this roughly corresponds to the South West Region, it also includes the Western counties of the South East Region, and excludes Cornwall, which it describes as being "the last of the Celtic areas to be brought under Wessex rule, retain[ing] a more distinct character" as well as "its own devolutionary party", Mebyon Kernow. The assembly has variously been described as having a rotating location in the style of the Anglo-Saxon Witenagemot and as being based in Winchester, which had been the capital of the ancient kingdom of Wessex. The assembly would take power from Parliament in Westminster rather than from local authorities.

In light of UK government recognition of the Cornish people as a national minority under a European treaty, in 2014 the party called for greater protection of local produce and what it described as the "Wessex dialect". The party believes that the Wessex region has a distinct cultural identity, which it seeks to promote. It defines this culture as including morris dancing, cider, and the works of various local writers. The party was described in 2010 by The Guardian as having a "nostalgia for pre–industrial revolution England".

A 2018 survey found that when prompted with a text emphasising shared DNA, history, and linguistic features, as well as which focused on political concerns of a regional scale, people from the South West of England were more likely to express support for the Wessex Regionalists.

In 2026, the party expressed skepticism towards upcoming structural changes to local government in England, arguing that devolved regional governance could better relieve local authorities of pressures caused by "problems of a larger scale" such as adult social care.

== Leadership ==
The Wessex Regionalists are led by the WR Council, made up of a minimum of four members.

=== WR Council composition ===
Role	Name
President	Nick Xylas
Secretary-General	George Wright
Treasurer	David Robins
Member of Council without Portfolio	Jim Gunter

=== Presidents (1974–present) ===
No.	Name	Term start	Term end
1	Alexander Thynn		
2	John Banks		
3	Colin Bex		
4	Nick Xylas		

== Electoral performance ==
=== Local elections ===
Election	Candidate	Local authority	Ward	Votes	%
2016	Nick Xylas	Bristol City Council	Eastville	62	0.85
2026	James Edward Crabb	Hampshire County Council	Winchester Eastgate	49	0.79

=== Parish and town council elections ===
Election	Candidate	Town / parish council	Ward	Votes	%
2023	Nick Xylas	Patchway	Coniston	152	3.97

=== General elections ===
Election	Candidate	Constituency	Votes	%
1974 (February)	Alexander Thynn	Westbury	521	0.85
1979	Colin Bex	Windsor and Maidenhead	251	0.39
1979	Henrietta Rous	North Devon	50	0.08
1979	Gwendoline Ewen	West Dorset	192	0.43
1979	Michael Mahoney	Winchester	395	0.58
1979	Alexander Thynn	Wells	155	0.26
1979	Anthony Mockler	Devizes	142	0.22
1979	Tom Thatcher	Westbury	1,905	3.00
1983	Anthony Mockler	Wantage	183	0.37
1983	Colin Bex	Windsor and Maidenhead	68	0.12
1983	Henrietta Rous	Torridge and West Devon	113	0.21
1983	David Fox	Dorset North	294	0.57
1983	Simon Winkworth	Winchester	155	0.28
1983	Adam Stout	Wansdyke	213	0.41
1983	David Robins	Woodspring	177	0.32
1983	Gwendoline Ewen	Devizes	234	0.38
1983	Maya Kemp	Salisbury	182	0.34
1983	John Banks	Westbury	131	0.22
1997	Colin Bex	Portsmouth North	72	0.16
2001	Colin Bex	Wells	167	0.33
2001	Henrietta Rous	Winchester	66	0.11
2005	Colin Bex	South Dorset	83	0.17
2010	Colin Bex	Witney	62	0.11
2013 Eastleigh by-election	Colin Bex	Eastleigh	30	0.07
2015	Colin Bex	Witney	110	0.19
2017	Jim Gunter	Devizes	223	0.44

=== European Parliament elections ===
Election	Candidate	Constituency	Votes	%
1979	Alexander Thynn	Wessex	1,706	0.83
1984	Henrietta Rous	Devon	659	0.33
1989	Gwendoline Ewen	Bristol	1,017	0.46
1989	Henrietta Rous	Devon	385	0.17
1989	Anthony Mockler	Somerset and Dorset West	930	0.39

== Sources ==
- Banks, John C. (1986). "The Regionalist (No. 8)". The Regionalist. Houghton-le-Spring: John Ellis. ISSN 0264-522X.
- Wessex Regionalists (1996). The Statute of Wessex. Cheltenham: Wessex Regionalists. ISBN 0-9508721-0-5.
