= Pryse Campbell =

Scottish politician

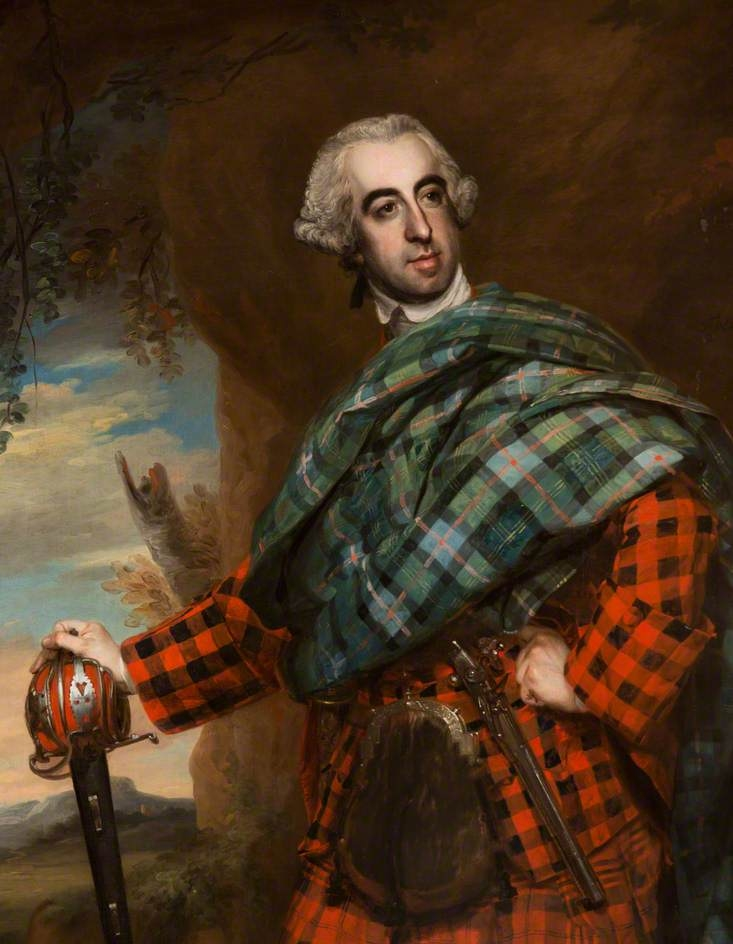
- Portrait by Francis Cotes

Member of Parliament for Cardigan Boroughs
- In office 24 March 1768 – 14 December 1768
- Preceded by: Sir Herbert Lloyd, 1st Baronet
- Succeeded by: Ralph Congreve

Member of Parliament for Nairnshire
- In office 18 April 1761 – March 1768
- Preceded by: John Campbell
- Succeeded by: Cosmo Gordon

Member of Parliament for Inverness-shire
- In office 1754–1761
- Preceded by: Norman Macleod
- Succeeded by: Simon Fraser

Personal details
- Born: 1727 Cawdor Castle, Great Britain
- Died: 14 December 1768 (aged 41)
- Party: Whig
- Spouse: Sarah Bacon (d.1767)
- Children: 7
- Education: Clare College, Cambridge

Pryse Campbell (1727 – 14 December 1768), was a Scottish politician. He was the Member of Parliament (MP) for Cardigan Boroughs, Inverness-shire and Nairnshire.

He was also the Lord Commissioner of the Admiralty and Lord Commissioner of the Treasury.

== Early life and education ==
Campbell was born in 1727 as the first son of John Campbell of Calder (or Cawdor). Campbell went on to attend Clare College, Cambridge in 1745.

== Political career ==
From his youth Campbell was intended for a parliamentary career, being mentioned as a possible candidate for Inverness-shire as early as December 1746; when he was 19. Unlike his father, Campbell was a strong supporter of Pitt the Elder, and it was thought Campbell might seem destined for a successful political career. Campbell later became an MP in 1754, when he was returned for Inverness-shire with the support of the Duke of Argyll. Argyll was supportive of the political aspirations of Simon Fraser of Lovat, a former Jacobite, but believed that 1754 was too soon for such a return for Fraser, and would cause offense in London.

Despite this there was still a degree of competition with Fraser's interest for the seat. Aware that Fraser's acquisition of a Highland regiment in January 1757 heightened his political credibility with Inverness-shire voters, Pryse refused to assist in the recruitment process; but it was his support for the Irish Cattle Importation Act during February and March 1759 that deeply damaged his relationship with his constituents. By February 1761 Argyll had made it clear he would oppose reselection of Pryse for Inverness-shire, with the result that the latter, with the support of the Earl of Bute, stood for and won the Nairnshire seat.

Despite being created a lord of treasury in August 1766 and being re-elected to parliament on 4 December 1766, Campbell was still faced the problem that under the Scottish electoral system Nairnshire would not be represented at the next election. As a result, he switched to his Welsh interest and was elected for the Cardigan Boroughs on 24 March 1768, but died on 14 December of the same year.

== Family ==
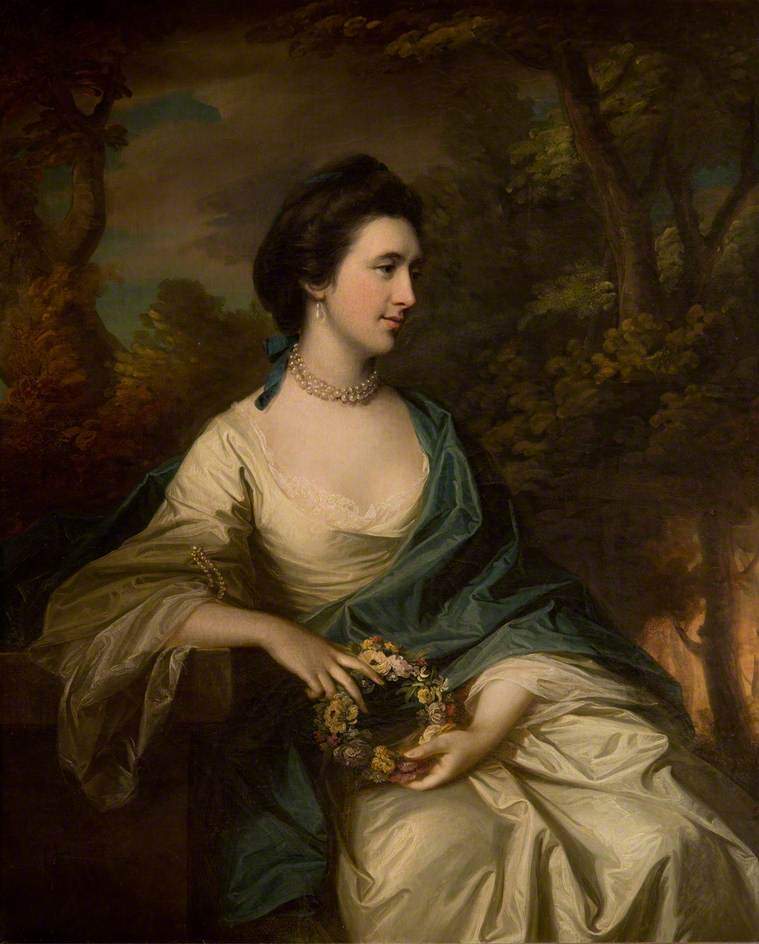
Sarah Bacon; Campbell's wife

On 20 September 1752 Campbell married Sarah, daughter and heir of Sir Edmund Bacon, sixth baronet, of Garboldisham, Norfolk; they had four sons and three daughters.

He was succeeded by his son John, who was later created Baron Cawdor.

Parliament of Great Britain
Preceded by Norman Macleod	Member of Parliament for Inverness-shire; 1754 – 1761	Succeeded by Simon Fraser
Preceded by John Campbell	Member of Parliament for Nairnshire; 1761 – 1768	Succeeded by Cosmo Gordon
Preceded by Sir Herbert Lloyd, 1st Baronet	Member of Parliament for Cardigan Boroughs; 1768 – 1768	Succeeded by Ralph Congreve
