= Nathaniel Bond (born 1754) =

English politician

Member of Parliament for Corfe Castle
- In office 25 February 1801 – 1807 Serving with Henry Bankes

Personal details
- Born: 1 November 1754
- Died: 8 October 1823 (aged 68)
- Party: Whig
- Relations: John Bond (1717–1784) (father); John Bond (1678–1744) (grandfather); Nathaniel Bond (great-grandfather)

Nathaniel Bond (1 November 1754 – 8 October 1823) was an English politician who was Member of Parliament for Corfe Castle.

On 8 March 1806 he was appointed Judge Advocate General in the Ministry of All the Talents.
