= Francis Hawley (Corfe Castle MP) =

English politician (d.1594)

Member of Parliament for Corfe Castle
- In office 1584–1589 Serving with John Clavell and William Hatton
- Preceded by: Charles Mathew
- Succeeded by: Francis Flower

Personal details
- Died: 1594

Francis Hawley (died 1594) was an English politician in the 16th century.
