= John Campbell of Cawdor =

British politician

John Campbell of Stackpole Court and Cawdor (1695–1777), was a British politician. He was a Member of Parliament (MP) for Pembrokeshire, Nairnshire, Inverness Burghs and Corfe Castle.

He was born the second son of Sir Alexander Campbell, MP in the Scottish Parliament, and his wife Elizabeth, daughter of Sir John Lort, 2nd Baronet, of Stackpole Court, Pembrokeshire. He was educated at Lincoln's Inn (1708) and Clare College, Cambridge (1711) and succeeded his mother to the Stackpole estate in 1714 and his grandfather Sir Hugh Campbell to estates in Nairnshire (Cawdor), Inverness-shire, and Argyll in 1716. Stackpole Court became the family home.

He was elected Member of Parliament (MP) for Pembrokeshire in 1727, sitting until 1747. He afterwards represented Nairnshire from 1747 to 1754, Inverness Burghs from 1754 to 1761 and Corfe Castle from 1762 to 1768.

He was also the Lord Commissioner of the Admiralty (1736–42) and Lord Commissioner of the Treasury (1746–54).

He died in 1777. In 1726 he had married Mary, the daughter and coheiress of Lewis Pryse, of Gogerddan, Cardiganshire, and had three sons (including Pryse Campbell and Alexander Campbell father of Henry Frederick Campbell) and three daughters.

Parliament of Great Britain
Preceded by Sir Arthur Owen, Bt	Member of Parliament for Pembrokeshire; 1727–1747	Succeeded by Sir William Owen, Bt
Preceded by No representation 1741–1747; Alexander Brodie 1735–1741	Member of Parliament for Nairnshire; 1747–1754	Succeeded by No representation 1754–1761; Pryse Campbell 1761–1768
Preceded by Alexander Brodie	Member of Parliament for Inverness Burghs; 1754–1761	Succeeded by Sir Alexander Grant, Bt
Preceded by Viscount Malpas; Henry Bankes	Member of Parliament for Corfe Castle; 1762–1768; With: Viscount Malpas until 1764; John Bond from 1764	Succeeded by John Bond; John Jenkinson
