= Corfe Castle (constituency) =

Former parliamentary constituency in the United Kingdom

- Former borough constituency for the House of Commons

1572–1832
- Seats: Two

Corfe Castle was a parliamentary borough in Dorset, which elected two Members of Parliament (MPs) to the House of Commons from 1572 until 1832, when it was abolished by the Great Reform Act.

== History ==
Corfe Castle was made a borough by Queen Elizabeth I, through the influence of Sir Christopher Hatton, who had been granted the manor. The borough consisted of the town of Corfe Castle on the Isle of Purbeck, once a market town but by the 19th century little more than a village, where the main economic interests were clay and stone quarrying. In 1831, the population of the borough was approximately 960, in 156 houses. (The portion of the town outside the borough contained another 141 houses.)

The right to vote was exercised by all householders (resident or not) paying scot and lot; in 1816 this amounted to only 44 voters, and all but 14 of those were non-resident. The local landowners were able to exercise almost total influence. In the late 18th and early 19th century, the Bankes family (who had owned the castle since 1640) nominated the member for one of the seats and the Bond family for the other. It was therefore a rotten borough.

Corfe Castle was abolished as a separate constituency by the Reform Act 1832; however, the nearby borough of Wareham kept one of its MPs, and Corfe Castle was included within the expanded boundaries of the revised Wareham constituency.

== Members of Parliament ==
=== 1572–1640 ===
Parliament	First member	Second member
Parliament of 1572–1581	Edmund Uvedale	Charles Mathew
Parliament of 1584–1585	John Clavell	Francis Hawley
Parliament of 1586–1587	Sir William Hatton	Francis Hawley
Parliament of 1588–1589	Sir William Hatton	Francis Hawley
Parliament of 1593	William Tate	Francis Flower
Parliament of 1597–1598	Francis James	John Foyle
Parliament of 1601	John Durning	John Davies
Parliament of 1604–1611	Edward Dackombe	Sir John Hobart
Addled Parliament (1614)	John Dackombe	James Whitelocke Chose to sit for Woodstock; Elected in his place Sir Thomas Tracie
Parliament of 1621–1622	Sir Thomas Hatton	Sir Thomas Hammond
Happy Parliament (1624–1625)	Sir Francis Nethersole	Sir Peter Osborne
Useless Parliament (1625)	Sir Francis Nethersole	Sir Peter Osborne
Parliament of 1625–1626	Edward Dackombe	Sir Robert Napier
Parliament of 1628–1629	Sir Francis Nethersole	Giles Green
No parliament summoned 1629–1640

=== 1640–1832 ===
Year	First member	First party	Second member	Second party
April 1640	Thomas Jermyn		Henry Jermyn	Royalist
November 1640	Sir Francis Windebank	Royalist	Giles Green	Parliamentarian
1641	John Borlase	Royalist	Giles Green	Parliamentarian
March 1644	Borlase disabled from sitting – seat vacant		Giles Green	Parliamentarian
1645	Francis Chettel		Giles Green	Parliamentarian
December 1648	Chettel not recorded as sitting after Pride's Purge		Green excluded in Pride's Purge – seat vacant	
1653	Corfe Castle unrepresented in the Barebones Parliament and the First and Second Parliaments of the Protectorate			
January 1659	Sir Ralph Bankes		John Tregonwell	
May 1659	Corfe Castle was not represented in the restored Rump Parliament			
April 1660	Sir Ralph Bankes		John Tregonwell	
1677	Viscount Latimer		John Tregonwell	
February 1679	Viscount Osborne		John Tregonwell	
April 1679	Sir Nathaniel Napier		John Tregonwell	
September 1679	Sir Nathaniel Napier		Nathaniel Bond	
1681	Sir Nathaniel Napier		Richard Fownes	
1689	William Okeden		Richard Fownes	
1690	William Culliford		Richard Fownes	
1698	William Culliford		John Bankes	
1699	Richard Fownes		John Bankes	
1715	Denis Bond		William Okeden	
1718	Denis Bond		Joshua Churchill	
1721	Denis Bond		John Bond	
1722	Denis Bond		John Bankes	
1727	John Bond		John Bankes	
1741	John Bond		Henry Bankes	
1744	Thomas Erle Drax		Henry Bankes	
1747	John Bond		Henry Bankes	
1761	Viscount Malpas		Henry Bankes	
1762	Viscount Malpas		John Campbell	
1764	John Bond		John Campbell	
1768	John Bond		John Jenkinson	
1780	John Bond	Whig	Henry Bankes	Tory
1801	Nathaniel Bond	Whig	Henry Bankes	Tory
1807	Peter William Baker	Tory	Henry Bankes	Tory
1816	George Bankes	Tory	Henry Bankes	Tory
1823	John Bond	Tory	Henry Bankes	Tory
1826	John Bond	Tory	George Bankes	Tory
1828	Nathaniel William Peach	Tory	George Bankes	Tory
1829	Philip John Miles	Tory	George Bankes	Tory
1832	Constituency abolished			
