= George Cholmondeley, Viscount Malpas =

British soldier and politician (1724–1764)

Viscount Malpas

Member of the British House of Commons
- In office 1754 – 15 March 1764
- Preceded by: Joseph Damer
- Succeeded by: John Bond
- Constituency: Leicestershire (1754–1761); Maidstone (1761–1764)

Personal details
- Born: 17 October 1724
- Died: 15 March 1764 (aged 39)
- Spouse: Hester Edwardes (m. 1747)
- Children: George Cholmondeley, 1st Marquess of Cholmondeley
- Parent(s): George Cholmondeley, 3rd Earl of Cholmondeley; Lady Mary Walpole

Military service
- Allegiance: Great Britain
- Years of service: 1745
- Battles/wars: War of the Austrian Succession 2nd Battle of Fontenoy

George Cholmondeley, Viscount Malpas (/ˈtʃʌmli/ CHUM-lee; 17 October 1724 – 15 March 1764) was a British soldier and Member of Parliament.

Cholmondeley was the eldest son of George Cholmondeley, 3rd Earl of Cholmondeley, and Lady Mary Walpole, daughter of Prime Minister Robert Walpole, 1st Earl of Orford. He gained the courtesy title of Viscount Malpas when his father succeeded as third Earl of Cholmondeley in 1733. He fought in the Second Battle of Fontenoy in 1745 and later achieved the rank of Lieutenant-Colonel in the 65th Regiment of Foot.

He married Hester Edwardes, daughter of Sir Francis Edwardes, 3rd Baronet, on 19 January 1746. They had two children:

- George Cholmondeley, 1st Marquess of Cholmondeley (1749–1827), succeeded his grandfather as 4th Earl of Cholmondeley in 1770
- Hon. Hester Cholmondeley (1755–1828), lady-in-waiting to Caroline of Brunswick

In 1754, he was elected to the House of Commons for Bramber, a seat he held until 1761, and then to represent Corfe Castle between 1761 and 1764.

He was given the colonelcy for life of the 65th Foot in 1760.

After returning from duty with his regiment in Ireland, Lord Malpas died after five days' illness with 'inflammation of the bowels' on 15 March 1764, aged 39, predeceasing his father. His son George succeeded his grandfather as 4th Earl of Cholmondeley in 1770 and was created Marquess of Cholmondeley in 1815. Lady Malpas died in 1794.

Parliament of Great Britain
| Preceded by The Lord Milton; Henry Pelham | Member of Parliament for Bramber; 1754–1761; With: Nathaniel Newnham | Succeeded by Andrew Archer; William Fitzherbert |
| Preceded by John Bond; Henry Bankes | Member of Parliament for Corfe Castle; 1761–1764; With: Henry Bankes 1761–1762; John Campbell 1762–1764 | Succeeded by John Campbell; John Bond |
Military offices
| Preceded by Robert Armiger | Colonel of the 65th Regiment of Foot; 1760–1764 | Succeeded by Edward Urmston |
