= William Okeden =

English Member of Parliament (died 1718)

MP for Corfe Castle
- In office 1715 – 26 September 1718

William Okeden (1662 – 26 September 1718) was a British politician who sat in the House of Commons representing Corfe Castle and Wareham.

He was High Sheriff of Dorset in 1699.

== See also ==
- List of MPs elected to the English Parliament in 1689
- List of MPs elected in the 1715 British general election
