= John Bond (1717–1784) =

British barrister and politician

John Bond (11 May 1717 – 30 May 1784) was a British barrister and politician.

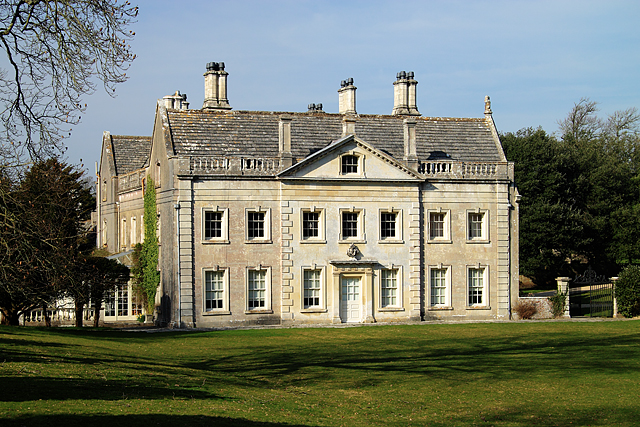
Creech Grange, Dorset

He was the eldest son of John Bond of Tyneham, Dorset and educated in the law at the Inner Temple and Wadham College, Oxford. He was called to the bar in 1740. He succeeded his father at Tyneham in 1744 and his uncle Denis Bond at Creech Grange, Dorset in 1747. These estates carried with them influence in local politics: in 1747, he was chosen recorder of nearby Wareham, an office he held until his death, and in the general election of that year, he was returned to Parliament for the borough of Corfe Castle. On 17 July 1749, he married Mary, the daughter of Edmund Dummer of Swaythling and stepdaughter of his uncle Denis. They had five sons and two daughters, including John and Nathaniel.

In 1756, he was appointed recorder of Dorchester, holding office until 1781. He continued to be returned for Corfe Castle, where he kept up an agreement with the Bankes family, who owned substantial property within the borough, to return one member on each of their interests. For unknown reasons, he did not stand at the 1761 election, and returned Viscount Malpas on his interest instead. Malpas died in 1764, and Bond had himself returned at the ensuing by-election. An independent supporter of Government, little is known of his political convictions or activity in the House.

On 18 July 1772, Bond was appointed recorder of Poole, an office he held until his death. He stood down from Parliament in the 1780 election in favour of his eldest living son, John. His other son Nathaniel Bond was another MP for Corfe Castle.

Bond died on 30 May 1784 and was succeeded to Creech Grange by his son John. His obituary noted his studies of classical authors and of British constitutional law, and his recreation of making improvements to his estate.

Parliament of Great Britain
Preceded by Henry Bankes; Thomas Erle Drax	Member of Parliament for Corfe Castle; 1747–1761; With: Henry Bankes	Succeeded by Henry Bankes; Viscount Malpas
Preceded by Viscount Malpas; John Campbell	Member of Parliament for Corfe Castle; 1764–1780; With: John Campbell 1764–1768; John Jenkinson 1768–1780	Succeeded by John Bond; Henry Bankes
