= 2026 Hampshire County Council election =

2026 English local government election

- 7 May 2026

All 78 seats to Hampshire County Council 40 seats needed for a majority
- Registered: 1,072,971
- Turnout: 484,422; 45.1%

	First party	Second party	Third party
Leader	Nick Adams-King	Keith House
Party	Conservative	Liberal Democrats	Reform
Last election	56 seats, 50.7%	17 seats, 26.8%	0 seats, 0.3%
Seats before	49	19	1
Seats won	27	26	20
Seat change	▼29	▲9	▲20
Popular vote	138,759	126,802	134,689
Percentage	27.7%	25.3%	26.9%
Swing	▼23.0	▼1.5
	Fourth party	Fifth party	Sixth party
Party	Labour	Green	WBCP
Last election	3 seats, 12.6%	0 seats, 4.4%	1 seat, 0.5%
Seats before	3	1	1
Seats won	1	1	1
Seat change	▼2	▲1	Steady
Popular vote	32,619	55,914	3,569
Percentage	6.5%	11.2%	0.7%
Swing	▲6.1	▲6.8	▲0.2%
	Seventh party	Eighth party
Party	Independent	CCH
Last election	1 seat, 1.6%	0
Seats before	4	0
Seats won	1	1
Seat change	Steady	▲1
- Results by Ward
Leader before election
Nick Adams-King
Conservative
Leader after election
Nick Adams-King
Conservative
No overall control

The 2026 Hampshire County Council election took place on 7 May 2026 to elect all 78 seats at Hampshire County Council in Hampshire, England.

Prior to the election, the council was under Conservative majority control. The council went under no overall control at this election. The Conservatives narrowly remained the largest party, winning 27 seats, one more than the Liberal Democrats who won 26 seats. Reform UK, which had just one seat immediately before the election, won 20 seats. At the subsequent annual council meeting on 21 May 2026, both the incumbent Conservative leader, Nick Adams-King, and the Liberal Democrat leader, Keith House, were nominated for the role of leader of the council. Adams-King won with the support of some of the Reform councillors and an independent.

== Background ==
At the 2021 election, the Conservatives won a majority of seats. In May 2024, Nick Adams-King became the new council leader. This was amid a public consultation on cuts worth £132m from the council budget by April 2025.

County Council elections usually occur every four years. In early 2025 it was announced that, owing to upcoming structural changes to local government in England, the elections in some areas – including Hampshire – would be postponed from May 2025 to May 2026. In late 2025 the government said that elections in a greater number of areas would be moved back another year, but this was reversed in the face of a legal challenge by Reform UK.

== Council composition ==
2021 election		Before 2026 election		After 2026 election	
Party	Seats	Party	Seats	Party	Seats
Conservative	56	Conservative	49	Conservative	27
Liberal Democrats	17	Liberal Democrats	19	Liberal Democrats	26
Labour	3	Labour	3	Labour	1
WBCP	1	WBCP	1	WBCP	1
Green	1	Green	1	Green	1
Reform	0	Reform	1	Reform	20
Independent	1	Independent	4	Independent	1
CCH	0	CCH	0	CCH	1

Changes 2021–2026:

- March 2023:
  - Gary Hughes (Conservative) resigns – by-election held May 2023
  - Alexis McEvoy (Conservative) leaves party to sit as an independent
- May 2023:
  - Ryan Brent (Conservative) wins by-election
  - Sarah Pankhurst (Conservative) leaves party to sit as an independent
- September 2023: Prad Bains (Conservative) joins Liberal Democrats
- March 2024: Seán Woodward (Conservative) and Hugh Lumby (Conservative) resign – by-elections held May 2024
- May 2024: Malcolm Wallace (Green) gains by-election from Conservatives; Joanne Burton (Conservative) wins by-election
- September 2024: Rob Humby (Conservative) resigns – by-election held October 2024
- October 2024: Jonathan Williams (Liberal Democrats) gains by-election from Conservatives
- January 2025: Neville Penman (Conservative) leaves party to sit as an independent
- March 2025: Dominic Hiscock (Liberal Democrats) and Adrian Collett (Liberal Democrats) resign – by-election held May 2025
- May 2025: Stuart Bailey (Liberal Democrats) and Paula Ferguson (Liberal Democrats) win by-elections
- October 2025: Barry Dunning (Conservative) joins Reform

=== Election result ===
2026 Hampshire County Council election
Party	Candidates	Seats	Gains	Losses	Net gain/loss	Seats %	Votes %	Votes	+/−
Conservative	78	27	0	27	▼27	34.6	27.7	138,759	▼23.0
Liberal Democrats	76	26	9	1	▲8	33.3	25.3	126,802	▼1.5
Reform	78	20	20	0	▲20	25.6	26.9	134,689	▲26.6
Green	78	1	1	1	Steady	1.3	11.2	55,914	▲6.8
Labour	77	1	0	2	▼2	1.3	6.5	32,619	▼6.1
Independent	7	1	0	0	Steady	1.3	0.8	3,994	▼0.8
WBCP	1	1	0	0	Steady	1.3	0.7	3,569	▲0.2
CCH	1	1	1	0	▲1	1.3	0.5	2,594	▼0.4
All in Party	1	0	0	0	Steady	0.0	0.2	1,144	N/A
Monster Raving Loony	1	0	0	0	Steady	0.0	0.0	106	N/A
Wessex Regionalists	1	0	0	0	Steady	0.0	0.0	49	N/A
SDP	1	0	0	0	Steady	0.0	0.0	43	N/A
Your Party	1	0	0	0	Steady	0.0	0.0	43	N/A
Libertarian	1	0	0	0	Steady	0.0	0.0	26	N/A

== Opinion polling ==
=== Voting intention ===
Date(s) conducted	Pollster	Client	Sample size	Area	Con	Lab	Grn	LD	Ref	Others	Lead
7 May 2026	2026 local elections				27.68%	6.55%	11.20%	25.48%	26.78%	2.31%	
27th March - 21st April	YouGov	None	677	GB	21%	8%	13%	27%	29%	2%	2
31 Mar – 13 Apr	JL Patners (MRP)	Daily Telegraph	4,089	GB	24%	10%	9%	12%	31%	4%	7
6 May 2021	2021 local elections				49.1%	20.5%	13.8%	11.1%	0.4%	5.1%	28.6

=== Seat projections ===
Date(s) conducted	Pollster	Client	Sample size	Area	Con	Lab	Grn	LD	Ref	Others	Majority
7 May 2026	2026 local elections				27	1	1	26	20	3	Hung
31st March - 13th April 2026	JL Partners	Daily Telegraph	4,089	GB	25	0	1	19	31	2	Hung (Ref −9)
6 May 2021	2021 local elections		–	–	56	3	0	17	0	2	39

== Results ==
=== Basingstoke and Deane ===
==== Borough summary ====
Borough summary
Party	Seats	+/-	Votes	%	+/-
Conservative	4	▼3	15,821	26.5	–23.3
Reform	3	▲3	16,297	27.3	N/A
Liberal Democrats	2	▲1	10,945	18.3	–0.7
Labour	1	▼1	7,772	13.0	–9.1
Green	0	Steady	7,679	12.9	N/A
All In	0	Steady	1,144	1.9	N/A
Total	10	Steady	59,658	42.7	
Registered electors			140,393	–	

==== Division results ====
Basingstoke Central
Party	Candidate	Votes	%	±%
Reform	Alan Stone	1,535	27.4	N/A
Labour	Abdel Ibrahim	1,284	22.9	−16.2
Conservative	Sean Dillow	1,105	19.7	−17.0
Green	Paul Briley	833	14.8	N/A
Liberal Democrats	John Shaw	808	14.4	+0.5
Majority		251	4.5	+2.1
Rejected ballots		47	0.8	N/A
Turnout		5612	39.0	+5.9
Registered electors		14,389		
Reform gain from Labour				

Basingstoke North
Party	Candidate	Votes	%	±%
Labour	Sajish Tom	1,515	34.1	−8.9
Reform	Duncan Stone	1,295	29.1	N/A
Green	Dee Marsland-Round	725	16.3	N/A
Conservative	Ricardo Ferriera	493	11.1	−19.9
Liberal Democrats	Michael Berwick-Gooding	389	8.7	−0.3
Majority		220	4.9	−7.0
Rejected ballots		32	0.7	
Turnout		4449	32.2	+5.9
Registered electors		13,811		
Labour hold				

Basingstoke North West
Party	Candidate	Votes	%	±%
Reform	James Barker	1,555	30.6	N/A
Conservative	Arun Mummalaneni*	1,260	24.8	−20.2
Labour	Angela Freeman	1,183	23.3	−17.7
Green	Christopher Duggan	659	13.0	N/A
Liberal Democrats	Mark Scott	388	7.6	−1.4
Majority		295	5.8	+0.9
Rejected ballots		37	0.7	N/A
Turnout		5082	36.5	+5.3
Registered electors		13,941		
Reform gain from Conservative				

Basingstoke South East
Party	Candidate	Votes	%	±%
Liberal Democrats	Gavin James*	2,251	35.1	−5.9
Reform	Christina Jordan	1,671	26.0	N/A
Labour Co-op	Andrew McCormick	897	14.0	−9.0
Green	Zander Fitzgerald	785	12.2	N/A
Conservative	Kishor Patel	783	12.2	−17.8
Majority		580	9.0	−1.9
Rejected ballots		32	0.5	
Turnout		6419	41.1	+8.1
Registered electors		15,633		
Liberal Democrats hold				

Basingstoke South West
Party	Candidate	Votes	%	±%
Conservative	Stephen Reid*	1,980	28.7	−28.3
Reform	Spencer Cleary	1,889	27.3	N/A
All in Party	Stacy Hart	1,144	16.6	N/A
Labour	Lilly Beeson	723	10.5	−10.5
Green	Jenny Gumbrell	592	8.6	N/A
Liberal Democrats	Andrea Bowes	582	8.4	−4.6
Majority		91	1.4	−34.8
Rejected ballots		20	0.3	N/A
Turnout		6930	45.7	+8.7
Registered electors		15,163		
Conservative hold				

Calleva
Party	Candidate	Votes	%	±%
Conservative	Rhydian Vaughan*	1,994	36.0	−28.0
Reform	Lorraine Harper	1,506	27.2	N/A
Liberal Democrats	Jo Slimin	1,266	22.9	+7.9
Green	Gary Scott	452	8.2	N/A
Labour	Bradley Phillips	317	5.7	−7.3
Majority		488	8.8	−39.6
Rejected ballots		30		
Turnout		5565	45.1	+4.1
Registered electors		12,346		
Conservative hold				

Candovers, Oakley and Overton
Party	Candidate	Votes	%	±%
Conservative	Juliet Henderson*	2,544	36.4	−15.6
Reform	Christopher Aldous	1,821	26.0	N/A
Liberal Democrats	Robert Cooper	1,262	18.0	−9.0
Green	Barney Scott	732	10.5	N/A
Labour	Michael Stockwell	634	9.1	−3.9
Majority		723	10.4	−15.2
Rejected ballots		52		
Turnout		7045	49.8	+4.8
Registered electors		14,134		
Conservative hold				

Loddon
Party	Candidate	Votes	%	±%
Reform	Paul Miller	1,945	28.4	N/A
Conservative	Stephen Parker	1,857	27.1	−36.9
Green	Jonathan Jenkin	1,485	21.7	N/A
Liberal Democrats	Richard Lilleker	945	13.8	−1.2
Labour	Ruth Kellaway	588	8.6	−5.4
Rejected ballots		37	0.5	
Turnout		6857	47.2	+10.2
Registered electors		14,522		
Reform gain from Conservative				

Tadley and Baughurst
Party	Candidate	Votes	%	±%
Liberal Democrats	Mark Wilson-Thomas	1,828	33.3	+2.3
Reform	Victoria Rhodes	1,620	29.5	N/A
Conservative	Maria Higson	1,372	25.0	−27.0
Green	Ralph Kent	421	7.7	N/A
Labour	Wayne Terry	225	4.1	−7.9
Majority		208	3.8	−16.5
Rejected ballots		20	0.4	
Turnout		5486	43.0	+7.0
Registered electors		12,765		
Liberal Democrats gain from Conservative				

Whitchurch and The Cleres
Party	Candidate	Votes	%	±%
Conservative	Tom Thacker*	2,433	37.3	−20.7
Reform	Phil Jeffery	1,460	22.4	N/A
Liberal Democrats	David Conquest	1,226	18.8	+5.8
Green	Claudia Camden-Smith	995	15.3	N/A
Labour	Michael Mumford	406	6.2	−7.8
Majority		973	14.9	−27.8
Rejected ballots		29		
Turnout		6549	47.8	+4.8
Registered electors		13,689		
Conservative hold				

=== East Hampshire (7 seats) ===
==== District summary ====
East Hampshire district summary
Party	Seats	+/-	Votes	%	+/-
Conservative	4	▼2	13,915	29.5	–21.4
Liberal Democrats	2	▲2	14,009	29.7	+4.6
WBCP	1	Steady	3,569	7.6	+2.2
Reform	0	Steady	10,414	22.0	+21.9
Green	0	Steady	4,183	8.9	+0.2
Labour	0	Steady	1,098	2.3	–5.8
SDP	0	Steady	43	0.1	N/A
Total	7	Steady	47,334	49.5	
Registered electors			95,688	–	

==== Division results ====
Alton Rural
Party	Candidate	Votes	%	±%
Conservative	Antonia Cox	2,701	37.2	−26.0
Liberal Democrats	Alexandra Ehrmann	2,289	31.5	+11.9
Reform	David Burton	1,604	22.1	N/A
Green	Ben Wills	536	7.4	−3.7
Labour	Barrington Clarke	133	1.8	−4.3
Turnout		7,277	54.1	+11.1
Rejected ballots		14	0.2	
Registered electors		13,444		
Conservative hold		Swing	▼19.0	

Alton Town
Party	Candidate	Votes	%	±%
Liberal Democrats	Emily Young	3,433	46.8	+4.2
Reform	Andrew Oates	1,612	22.0	N/A
Conservative	Brighton Gono	1,353	18.4	−25.7
Green	Lorna Woodcroft	786	10.7	N/A
Labour	Alexandra Faulkner-Hardy	155	2.1	−8.0
Turnout		7,359	48.8	+12.8
Rejected ballots		20		
Registered electors		15,084		
Majority		1,821	24.7	
Liberal Democrats gain from Conservative				

Catherington
Party	Candidate	Votes	%	±%
Conservative	Ian Young	2,161	34.3	−26.5
Reform	William Kellermann	1,941	30.8	N/A
Liberal Democrats	Raja Ali	1,437	22.8	+0.4
Green	Jim Rodgers	557	8.8	−1.0
Labour	Darren Meredith	167	2.6	−4.5
SDP	Ian Cousins	43	0.7	N/A
Turnout		6,315	48.4	
Rejected ballots		9		
Registered electors		13,039		
Conservative hold				

Liphook, Headley & Grayshott
Party	Candidate	Votes	%	±%
Conservative	Debbie Curnow-Ford*	2,519	37.4	−16.8
Reform	Chris Bullick	1,690	25.1	N/A
Liberal Democrats	Bobby Smith	1,681	24.9	−0.1
Green	James Hogan	632	9.4	+2.0
Labour	Diana Lovelock	205	3.0	−6.4
Turnout		6,740	48.8	+9.8
Rejected ballots		13	0.2	
Registered electors		13,798		
Conservative hold				

Petersfield Butser
Party	Candidate	Votes	%	±%
Liberal Democrats	David Podger	2,732	39.9	+12.3
Conservative	Robert Mocatta	1,995	29.2	−20.4
Reform	Ian Brodrick	1,387	20.3	N/A
Green	Oliver Hailstone	541	7.9	−5.2
Labour	Yvonne Heaton	188	2.7	−6.9
Turnout		6,859	49.0	+11.0
Rejected ballots		16	0.2	
Registered electors		14,004		
Liberal Democrats gain from Conservative		Swing	▲16.5	

Petersfield Hangers
Party	Candidate	Votes	%	±%
Conservative	Nicholas Drew	2,763	37.8	−13.9
Liberal Democrats	Thomas Figgins	2,298	31.5	+9.4
Reform	Robert Waddell	1,211	16.6	N/A
Green	Marley Bury	873	12.0	−1.8
Labour	Richard Carthew	160	2.2	−6.3
Turnout		7,322	55.7	+12.7
Rejected ballots		17		
Registered electors		13,144		
Conservative hold		Swing	▼11.7	

Whitehill, Bordon & Lindford
Party	Candidate	Votes	%	±%
WBCP	Andy Tree	3,569	65.5	+15.6
Reform	Tasha Vodden	969	17.8	+16.8
Conservative	Mike Willis	423	7.8	−18.4
Green	Jason Guy	258	4.7	+0.8
Liberal Democrats	Chris Botten	139	2.6	−10.7
Labour	Dave Hedley	90	1.7	−4.0
Turnout		5,462	41.5	+10.5
Rejected ballots		14		
Registered electors		13,175		
WBCP hold		Swing	▼0.6	

=== Eastleigh (8 seats) ===
==== Borough summary ====
Eastleigh borough summary
Party	Seats	+/-	Votes	%	+/-
Liberal Democrats	6	Steady	14,328	36.2	–7.2
Conservative	1	Steady	7,288	18.4	–19.4
Independent	1	Steady	2,087	5.3	+0.4
Reform	0	Steady	10,553	26.6	+26.3
Green	0	Steady	3,876	9.8	N/A
Labour	0	Steady	1,480	3.7	–8.0
Total	8	Steady	45,014	42.7	
Registered electors			105,304	–	

==== Division results ====
Bishopstoke & Fair Oak
Party	Candidate	Votes	%	±%
Independent	Louise Parker-Jones	1,906	31.6	−3.1
Reform	Graeme Smith	1,498	24.8	N/A
Liberal Democrats	Nick Couldrey	1,385	23.0	−7.0
Conservative	Ben Burcombe-Filer	667	11.1	−14.1
Green	Dani Hosford	424	7.0	N/A
Labour	Xander Peace	149	2.5	−4.4
Turnout		6,036	46.9	+3.9
Registered electors		12,870		
Independent hold				

Botley & Hedge End North
Party	Candidate	Votes	%	±%
Liberal Democrats	Rupert Kyrle	2,472	42.1	−8.1
Reform	Lee Tindal	1,404	23.9	N/A
Conservative	Finn Lennon	1,115	19.0	−20.5
Green	Luke Ottley	500	8.5	N/A
Labour	Edward Hill	203	3.5	−6.8
Independent	Russ Kitching	181	3.1	N/A
Turnout		5,896	41.4	+6.4
Registered electors		14,249		
Liberal Democrats hold				

Chandler's Ford
Party	Candidate	Votes	%	±%
Liberal Democrats	Tim Groves	2,786	47.5	+0.8
Reform	Micheal Hibberd	1,200	20.5	N/A
Conservative	Shelagh Lee	1,145	19.5	−26.4
Green	Oliver Smith	570	9.7	N/A
Labour	Chris Gibbs	160	2.7	−4.6
Turnout		5,894	49.9	+6.9
Registered electors		11,802		
Liberal Democrats hold				

Eastleigh North
Party	Candidate	Votes	%	±%
Liberal Democrats	Tanya Park	1,865	40.4	+2.1
Reform	Alex Culley	1,302	28.2	+25.8
Green	Alan Mcdonald	653	14.1	N/A
Conservative	Gavin Ellys	516	11.2	−20.6
Labour	Zak Southward	285	6.1	−15.4
Turnout		4,641	38.4	+3.4
Registered electors		12,093		
Liberal Democrats hold		Swing	▼11.9	

Eastleigh South
Party	Candidate	Votes	%	±%
Liberal Democrats	Prad Bains	2,429	41.2	−0.3
Reform	Clare Fawcett	1,642	27.8	N/A
Green	Jim Smith	777	13.2	N/A
Conservative	Yogesh Saxena	721	12.2	−22.3
Labour	Steven Phillips	331	5.6	−13.2
Turnout		5,936	37.2	
Registered electors		15,940		
Liberal Democrats hold				

Hamble
Party	Candidate	Votes	%	±%
Liberal Democrats	Keith House	2,675	42.3	−11.8
Reform	Neil Fleming	1,874	29.6	N/A
Conservative	Carys Chestnut	944	14.9	−18.7
Green	Joshua Buckle	596	9.4	N/A
Labour	Dennis Robinson	240	3.8	−8.5
Turnout		6,348	42.3	+5.3
Registered electors		15,020		
Liberal Democrats hold				

Hedge End & West End South
Party	Candidate	Votes	%	±%
Liberal Democrats	Tonia Craig	2,061	38.8	−7.6
Reform	Craig Palmer	1,528	28.8	N/A
Conservative	Jerry Hall	1,136	21.4	−24.6
Green	Dave Waghorn	464	8.7	N/A
Labour	Ebi Aninmadu	122	2.3	−5.3
Turnout		5,323	43.0	+4.0
Registered electors		12,384		
Liberal Democrats hold				

West End & Horton Heath
Party	Candidate	Votes	%	±%
Conservative	Steve Broomfield	1,560	31.9	−16.1
Liberal Democrats	Bruce Tennent	1,441	28.9	−10.9
Reform	Steve Humby	1,305	26.7	N/A
Green	Ben Parry	462	9.5	N/A
Labour	Hannah Bowyer	150	3.1	−6.9
Turnout		4,940	45.1	+6.1
Registered electors		10,946		
Conservative hold		Swing	▼2.6	

=== Fareham (7 seats) ===
==== Borough summary ====
Fareham borough summary
Party	Seats	+/-	Votes	%	+/-
Conservative	4	▼2	18,654	35.5	–19.7
Reform	2	▲2	13,870	26.4	+25.8
Liberal Democrats	1	Steady	11,422	21.7	+0.3
Green	0	Steady	4,891	9.3	+5.1
Labour	0	Steady	3,779	7.2	–5.2
Total	7	Steady	43,705	48.4	
Registered electors			90,322	–	

==== Division results ====
Fareham Crofton
Party	Candidate	Votes	%	±%
Conservative	Pal Hayre	3,379	49.2	−12.8
Reform	Peter Watson	1,501	21.9	N/A
Liberal Democrats	Jim Forrest	1,021	14.9	−14.1
Labour	Lynne Murray	539	7.9	−1.1
Green	Nick Lyle	421	6.1	N/A
Turnout		6,880	53.3	+4.3
Rejected ballots		19	0.3	
Registered electors		12,917		
Conservative hold				

Fareham Portchester
Party	Candidate	Votes	%	±%
Liberal Democrats	Chrissie Bainbridge	2,566	35.8	−12.4
Reform	Dave Eggelton	2,157	30.1	N/A
Conservative	Peter Maunder	1,698	23.7	−17.4
Green	David Palk	484	6.7	N/A
Labour	Richard Ryan	269	3.7	−7.0
Turnout		7,213	50.1	+10.1
Rejected ballots		38	0.5	
Registered electors		14,398		
Liberal Democrats hold				

Fareham Sarisbury
Party	Candidate	Votes	%	±%
Conservative	Joanne Burton	3,075	49.7	−7.7
Reform	Josh Read	1,224	19.8	N/A
Liberal Democrats	Graham Everdell	1,123	18.2	+5.3
Green	Polly Sanderson	612	9.9	N/A
Labour	Damilola Ogunleye	150	2.4	−10.0
Turnout		6,253	47.2	+8.2
Rejected ballots		68	1.1	
Registered electors		13,255		
Conservative hold				

Fareham Titchfield
Party	Candidate	Votes	%	±%
Conservative	Julie Bird	2,317	38.1	−26.8
Reform	Gary Fisk	1,811	29.8	+25.0
Liberal Democrats	Richard Blythin	972	16.0	+0.7
Green	Kat Bull	696	11.4	N/A
Labour	Lorraine Drinkwater	287	4.7	−10.2
Turnout		6,140	46.3	
Rejected ballots		55	0.9	
Registered electors		13,266		
Conservative hold		Swing	▼25.9	

Fareham Town (2 seats)
Party	Candidate	Votes	%	±%
Reform	Richard Harris	2,870	29.6	N/A
Reform	Paul Woolley	2,728	28.2	N/A
Conservative	Lisa Whittle	2,452	25.3	−29.8
Liberal Democrats	David Hamilton	2,429	25.1	+9.5
Liberal Democrats	Kirsten Wiltshire	2,304	23.8	+9.6
Conservative	Paul Whittle	2,226	23.0	−17.6
Labour	Gemma Furnivall	1,401	14.5	+0.1
Green	Baz Marie	1,089	11.2	−3.1
Green	John Vivian	1,023	10.6	+1.0
Labour	Dominic Martin	853	8.8	−3.4
Turnout		10,238	45.6	+8.6
Rejected ballots		43		
Registered electors		22,458		
Reform gain from Conservative				
Reform gain from Conservative				

Fareham Warsash
Party	Candidate	Votes	%	±%
Conservative	Mike Ford	3,507	50.5	−20.0
Reform	Steve Wallace	1,579	22.8	N/A
Liberal Democrats	Jon Sacker	1,007	14.5	−1.3
Green	Jake Waterfall	566	8.2	N/A
Labour	David Rodgers	280	4.0	−9.6
Turnout		6,981	49.8	+6.8
Rejected ballots		40	0.6	
Registered electors		14,028		
Conservative hold				

=== Gosport (5 seats) ===
==== Borough summary ====
Gosport borough summary
Party	Seats	+/-	Votes	%	+/-
Conservative	3	▼1	11,761	32.4	–18.3
Reform	2	▲2	11,812	32.5	+31.2
Liberal Democrats	0	▼1	6,862	18.9	–12.7
Green	0	Steady	3,731	10.3	N/A
Labour	0	Steady	2,173	6.0	–7.8
Total	5	Steady	27,021	43.5	
Registered electors			62,109	–	

==== Division results ====
Bridgemary
Party	Candidate	Votes	%	±%
Reform	Paul Carter	2,445	44.9	N/A
Liberal Democrats	Steve Hammond	1,309	24.1	−18.5
Conservative	Supriya Namdeo	1,067	19.6	−29.2
Green	Lucy Maclennan	444	8.2	N/A
Labour	Ivan Gray	176	3.2	−5.4
Turnout		5,471	40.7	+6.7
Rejected ballots		23	0.4	
Registered electors		13,450		
Reform gain from Conservative				

Hardway
Party	Candidate	Votes	%	±%
Reform	Colin Towell	1,951	38.7	+35.0
Liberal Democrats	Sue Ballard	1,475	29.3	−17.0
Conservative	Robert Thompson	864	17.2	−21.0
Green	Anthony Sudworth	509	10.1	N/A
Labour	Stephen Osborne	236	4.7	−7.0
Turnout		5,050	40.3	
Rejected ballots		15	0.3	
Registered electors		12,531		
Reform gain from Liberal Democrats		Swing	▲26.0	

Lee
Party	Candidate	Votes	%	±%
Conservative	Graham Burgess	2,634	45.0	−20.9
Reform	Ian Brown	1,794	30.6	N/A
Green	Matt Reeve-Fowkes	542	9.3	N/A
Labour Co-op	Jonathan Brown	463	7.9	−2.9
Liberal Democrats	Clive Foster-Reed	426	7.3	−16.0
Turnout		5,881	44.6	+10.6
Rejected ballots		20	0.3	
Registered electors		13,197		
Conservative hold				

Leesland and Town (2 seats)
Party	Candidate	Votes	%	±%
Conservative	Zoe Huggins	3,662	36.6	−18.8
Conservative	Lesley Meenaghan	3,534	35.3	−9.1
Reform	Paul Jacobs	3,068	30.7	+27.7
Reform	Emily Strudwick	2,555	25.5	N/A
Liberal Democrats	Rob Hylands	1,945	19.4	−11.6
Liberal Democrats	Julie Westerby	1,707	17.1	−5.1
Green	Lucy Cooper	1,304	13.0	N/A
Green	Aid Smalley	932	9.3	N/A
Labour	Tynan Bryant	723	7.2	−10.1
Labour	Hilary Percival	575	5.7	−11.4
Turnout		10,619	46.3	−12.7
Rejected ballots		23		
Registered electors		22,931		
Conservative hold				
Conservative hold				

=== Hart (5 seats) ===
==== District summary ====
Hart district summary
Party	Seats	+/-	Votes	%	+/-
Conservative	2	▼2	10,369	30.0	–19.7
Liberal Democrats	2	▲1	9,557	27.7	–1.2
CCH	1	▲1	2,594	7.5	–4.8
Reform	0	Steady	8,271	24.0	+23.7
Green	0	Steady	2,501	7.2	N/A
Labour	0	Steady	1,130	3.3	–2.8
Monster Raving Loony	0	Steady	106	0.3	N/A
Total	5	Steady	34,604	46.1	
Registered electors			75,051	–	

==== Division results ====
Church Crookham & Ewshot
Party	Candidate	Votes	%	±%
CCH	Alan Oliver	2,594	37.7	−0.9
Conservative	Jon Farmer	1,686	24.5	−18.7
Reform	Cancice Walmsley	1,663	24.2	N/A
Green	Sven Saar	639	9.3	N/A
Labour	Adam Coulthard	300	4.4	−1.8
Turnout		6,882	45.3	+3.3
Rejected ballots		24		
Registered electors		15,205		
CCH gain from Conservative		Swing	▲8.9	

Fleet Town
Party	Candidate	Votes	%	±%
Conservative	Steve Forster	3,013	40.6	−13.7
Liberal Democrats	Peter Wildsmith	2,427	32.7	+16.5
Reform	George Parnell	1,210	16.3	+14.7
Green	Jacky Moore	448	6.0	N/A
Labour	Andrew Perkins	215	2.9	−4.0
Monster Raving Loony	Howling Laud Hope	106	1.4	N/A
Turnout		7,446	48.8	+4.8
Rejected ballots		27		
Registered electors		15,257		
Conservative hold		Swing	▼15.1	

Hartley Wintney & Yateley West
Party	Candidate	Votes	%	±%
Liberal Democrats	Richard Quarterman	2,422	34.8	−3.0
Conservative	Tim Davies	2,122	30.5	−21.5
Reform	David Lovell	1,843	26.5	N/A
Green	Andy George	407	5.9	N/A
Labour	Elaine Fordham	156	2.2	−5.1
Turnout		6,965	45.9	+2.9
Rejected ballots		15	0.2	
Registered electors		15,185		
Liberal Democrats gain from Conservative				

Odiham & Hook
Party	Candidate	Votes	%	±%
Conservative	Chris Dorn	2,554	38.7	−23.6
Liberal Democrats	Ann Baty	1,833	27.8	+5.2
Reform	Clive Lawrance	1,456	22.1	N/A
Green	Adam Jacobs	510	7.7	N/A
Labour	Amanda Affleck-Cruise	229	3.5	−6.7
Turnout		6,602	47.7	+6.7
Rejected ballots		20	0.3	
Registered electors		13,833		
Conservative hold		Swing	▼14.4	

Yateley East & Blackwater
Party	Candidate	Votes	%	±%
Liberal Democrats	Stuart Bailey	2,875	42.9	−14.4
Reform	Trevor Lloyd-Jones	2,099	31.3	N/A
Conservative	Simon Birtwistle	994	14.8	−21.6
Green	Patrick Ryan	497	7.4	N/A
Labour	Benjamin Wickins	230	3.4	N/A
Turnout		6,709	43.1	+5.1
Rejected ballots		14	0.2	
Registered electors		15,571		
Liberal Democrats hold				

=== Havant (7 seats) ===
==== Borough summary ====
Havant borough summary
Party	Seats	+/-	Votes	%	+/-
Reform	6	▲6	15,770	40.3	N/A
Green	1	▲1	7,082	18.1	+10.0
Conservative	0	▼7	9,002	23.0	–37.8
Liberal Democrats	0	Steady	4,678	11.9	–1.3
Labour	0	Steady	2,636	6.7	–10.2
Total	7	Steady	40,181	42.0	
Registered electors			95,749	–	

==== Division results ====
Cowplain & Hart Plain
Party	Candidate	Votes	%	±%
Reform	Jason Gillen	2,557	48.6	N/A
Conservative	David Keast	1,231	23.4	−44.0
Liberal Democrats	Isabel Harrison	814	15.5	+7.8
Green	Clare Wakeley	659	12.5	+2.2
Turnout		5,294	42.0	+12.0
Rejected ballots		31		
Registered electors		12,605		
Reform gain from Conservative				

Emsworth & St. Faiths
Party	Candidate	Votes	%	±%
Green	Gráinne Rason	2,448	33.7	+20.8
Conservative	Andrew Proctor	1,858	25.5	−27.4
Reform	Jerry White	1,743	24.0	N/A
Labour	Dan Berwick	717	9.9	−11.7
Liberal Democrats	Michael Lind	507	7.0	−5.6
Majority		590	8.1	N/A
Turnout		7,273	52.2	+8.2
Registered electors		13,936		
Green gain from Conservative		Swing	▲24.1	

Hayling Island
Party	Candidate	Votes	%	±%
Reform	Michael Rennie	2,807	40.4	N/A
Green	Jonathan Hulls	1,913	27.5	+14.9
Conservative	Lance Quantrill	1,843	26.5	−33.0
Labour	Peter Oliver	382	5.5	−7.6
Turnout		7,002	49.1	+12.1
Rejected ballots		56		
Registered electors		14,267		
Reform gain from Conservative				

North East Havant
Party	Candidate	Votes	%	±%
Reform	George Madgwick	2,135	48.7	N/A
Conservative	Tim Pike	735	16.8	−39.5
Green	Henry Mitchell	597	13.6	N/A
Labour	Richard Brown	586	13.4	−10.0
Liberal Democrats	Catherine Billam	331	7.6	−3.3
Turnout		5,225	30.2	+4.2
Rejected ballots		23	0.4	
Registered electors		17,287		
Reform gain from Conservative				

North West Havant
Party	Candidate	Votes	%	±%
Reform	Paul McCormick	1,952	42.3	N/A
Conservative	Lulu Bowerman	997	21.6	−34.8
Liberal Democrats	Philippa Gray	904	19.6	−3.3
Green	Peter May	455	9.9	+3.2
Labour	Jason Horton	302	6.6	−7.4
Turnout		4,629	37.6	+11.6
Rejected ballots		17	0.4	
Registered electors		12,308		
Reform gain from Conservative				

Purbrook & Stakes South
Party	Candidate	Votes	%	±%
Reform	Terry Norton	2,177	42.3	N/A
Liberal Democrats	Antonia Harrison	1,141	22.1	+12.4
Conservative	Diana Patrick	1,050	20.4	−45.3
Green	Daniel Grove	415	8.1	−0.4
Labour	Simon Hagan	369	7.2	−8.9
Turnout		5,184	40.9	+12.9
Rejected ballots		30	0.6	
Registered electors		12,688		
Reform gain from Conservative				

Waterloo & Stakes North
Party	Candidate	Votes	%	±%
Reform	Gwen Robinson	2,399	43.3	N/A
Conservative	Mark Inkster	1,288	23.2	−48.4
Liberal Democrats	Paul Tansom	981	17.7	+5.2
Green	Steve Mayne	595	10.7	N/A
Labour	Munazza Faiz	280	5.1	−10.8
Turnout		5,574	44.0	+12.0
Rejected ballots		31	0.6	
Registered electors		12,658		
Reform gain from Conservative				

=== New Forest (10 seats) ===
==== District summary ====
New Forest district summary
Party	Seats	+/-	Votes	%	+/-
Reform	3	▲3	18,507	29.5	N/A
Conservative	3	▼5	16,686	26.6	–28.4
Liberal Democrats	3	▲2	16,405	26.1	+3.4
Green	0	Steady	6,482	10.3	+0.1
Labour	0	Steady	3,000	4.8	–4.3
Independent	0	Steady	1,669	2.7	+0.4
Your Party	0	Steady	43	0.1	N/A
Total	10	Steady	62,921	44.9	
Registered electors			140,025	–	

==== Division results ====
Brockenhurst
Party	Candidate	Votes	%	±%
Conservative	Dan Poole	2,625	37.2	−21.1
Reform	Simon Smith	1,899	26.9	N/A
Green	Barbara Czoch	1,513	21.4	+5.1
Liberal Democrats	Hannah Phillips	694	9.8	−7.5
Labour	Peter Dance	327	4.6	−3.6
Turnout		7,073	48.8	+9.8
Registered electors		14,496		
Conservative hold				

Dibden & Hythe
Party	Candidate	Votes	%	±%
Liberal Democrats	Malcolm Wade	3,409	50.8	+4.4
Reform	Jon Golding	1,810	27.0	N/A
Conservative	Kate Crisell	825	12.3	−26.2
Green	Ruth Arundell	481	7.2	+2.0
Labour	Peter Caroll	147	2.2	−3.0
Your Party	Doug Holloway	43	0.6	N/A
Turnout		6,727	46.7	+8.7
Registered electors		14,406		
Liberal Democrats hold				

Lymington & Boldre
Party	Candidate	Votes	%	±%
Liberal Democrats	Jack Davies	3,009	45.2	+22.6
Reform	Barry Dunning	1,520	22.9	N/A
Conservative	Ian Loveless	1,012	15.2	−26.9
Independent	Jacqui England	567	8.5	−12.6
Labour	Sally Johnston	292	4.4	−1.6
Green	Nizam Mamode	251	3.8	−4.4
Turnout		6,660	47.4	+9.4
Registered electors		14,044		
Liberal Democrats gain from Conservative				

Lyndhurst & Fordingbridge
Party	Candidate	Votes	%	±%
Liberal Democrats	David Millar	2,544	34.7	+15.2
Reform	Jason Lewis	1,872	25.6	N/A
Conservative	Brice Stratford	1,769	24.2	−31.2
Green	Janet Richards	911	12.4	−4.6
Labour	Chris Willsher	229	3.1	−5.0
Turnout		7,351	49.6	+12.6
Registered electors		14,824		
Liberal Democrats gain from Conservative				

New Milton
Party	Candidate	Votes	%	±%
Reform	Julie Vigor	2,105	34.6	N/A
Conservative	Alan O'Sullivan	2,075	34.1	−32.1
Liberal Democrats	Wynford Davies	916	15.1	+3.9
Green	Kirsty Gray	690	11.3	−0.4
Labour	Jerry Weber	299	4.9	−6.1
Turnout		6,095	43.6	+5.6
Registered electors		13,971		
Reform gain from Conservative				

New Milton North, Milford & Hordle
Party	Candidate	Votes	%	±%
Conservative	Fran Carpenter	2,851	39.4	−30.7
Reform	Lindsey Cooper	2,434	33.7	N/A
Liberal Democrats	Aidan Reed	843	11.7	+2.5
Green	Calre Muir	781	10.8	+1.6
Labour	Sherri Johnstone	303	4.2	−5.3
Turnout		7,229	48.0	+9.0
Registered electors		15,063		
Conservative hold				

Ringwood
Party	Candidate	Votes	%	±%
Reform	Martin Eyre	1,619	30.5	N/A
Conservative	Steve Rippon-Swaine	1,338	25.2	−32.0
Labour	Peter Kelleher	828	15.6	−2.5
Green	Janet Cox	616	11.6	−3.5
Independent	Michael Thierry	511	9.6	N/A
Liberal Democrats	Luke Dadford	399	7.5	−2.1
Turnout		5,319	40.7	+8.7
Registered electors		13,077		
Reform gain from Conservative				

South Waterside
Party	Candidate	Votes	%	±%
Reform	Paul Barrett	1,837	36.2	N/A
Conservative	Kim O'Halloran	1,371	27.0	−32.4
Liberal Democrats	Angela Pearson	761	15.0	−8.7
Independent	Peter Armstrong	591	11.6	N/A
Green	Chris Jones	364	7.2	+1.4
Labour	Pauline Brown	156	3.1	−8.1
Turnout		5,092	41.7	+11.7
Registered electors		12,207		
Reform gain from Conservative				

Totton North & Netley Marsh
Party	Candidate	Votes	%	±%
Conservative	Neville Penman	2,011	35.1	−28.3
Reform	Ian Coombes	1,754	30.6	N/A
Liberal Democrats	Caroline Rackham	1,215	21.2	+0.9
Green	Jasper Dalby	479	8.3	+1.3
Labour	Adrian Johnstone	268	4.7	−4.5
Turnout		5,737	40.6	+9.6
Registered electors		14,142		
Conservative hold				

Totton South & Marchwood
Party	Candidate	Votes	%	±%
Liberal Democrats	David Harrison	2,615	46.5	−2.2
Reform	Kevin Smith	1,657	29.4	N/A
Conservative	Len Harris	809	14.4	−25.6
Green	Oliver Alford-Evans	396	7.0	+2.4
Labour	Ken Kershaw	151	2.7	−3.9
Turnout		5,638	40.9	+6.9
Registered electors		13,795		
Liberal Democrats hold				

=== Rushmoor (5 seats) ===
==== Borough summary ====
Rushmoor borough summary
Party	Seats	+/-	Votes	%	+/-
Reform	4	▲4	8,432	30.0	+29.7
Conservative	1	▼3	6,940	24.7	–25.6
Labour	0	▼1	6,569	23.4	–7.9
Green	0	Steady	3,259	11.6	N/A
Liberal Democrats	0	Steady	2,924	10.4	–6.5
Total	5	Steady	28,252	41.9	
Registered electors			67,392	–	

==== Division results ====
Aldershot North
Party	Candidate	Votes	%	±%
Reform	Kevin Betsworth	1,583	31.8	N/A
Labour	Gaynor Austin	1,582	31.8	−12.2
Conservative	Daniel Kelly	837	16.8	−25.2
Green	Daryl Higgs	609	12.2	N/A
Liberal Democrats	Alan Hilliar	367	7.4	−6.6
Majority		1	0.02	−1.4
Turnout		4,978	38.4	+4.3
Registered electors		13,071		
Reform gain from Labour				

Aldershot South
Party	Candidate	Votes	%	±%
Reform	Ken Tranter	1,590	30.2	N/A
Labour	Keith Dibble	1,533	29.1	−16.2
Conservative	Bill Withers	1,211	23.0	−23.8
Green	Hazel Agombar	609	11.6	N/A
Liberal Democrats	Mark Trotter	329	6.2	−1.6
Turnout		5,297	33.7	−1.3
Rejected ballots		22	0.4	
Registered electors		12,744		
Reform gain from Conservative				

Farnborough North
Party	Candidate	Votes	%	±%
Reform	Ian Simpson	1,656	32.3	N/A
Conservative	Stuart Trussler	1,387	27.0	−27.0
Labour	Christine Guinness	1,155	22.5	−10.4
Green	Jules Crossley	572	11.2	N/A
Liberal Democrats	Olive O'Dowd-Booth	360	7.0	−6.2
Turnout		5,159	40.4	+7.0
Rejected ballots		27	0.5	
Registered electors		12,783		
Reform gain from Conservative				

Farnborough South
Party	Candidate	Votes	%	±%
Conservative	Roz Chadd	1,839	27.1	−20.1
Reform	Joey Noyce	1,738	25.6	+24.4
Liberal Democrats	Craig Card	1,373	20.2	−9.0
Labour	Gareth Williams	1,070	15.8	−1.2
Green	Zak Khan	765	11.3	N/A
Turnout		6,835	44.9	
Rejected ballots		49	0.7	
Registered electors		15,237		
Conservative hold		Swing	▼22.3	

Farnborough West
Party	Candidate	Votes	%	±%
Reform	Chris Harding	1,865	31.3	N/A
Conservative	Rod Cooper	1,666	28.0	−32.2
Labour	Becky Miles	1,229	20.6	−2.3
Green	Andy Wilson	704	11.8	N/A
Liberal Democrats	Leola Card	495	8.3	−8.5
Turnout		5,983	44.1	+8.0
Rejected ballots		24	0.4	
Registered electors		13,557		
Reform gain from Conservative				

=== Test Valley (7 seats) ===
==== District summary ====
Test Valley district summary
Party	Seats	+/-	Votes	%	+/-
Conservative	5	Steady	15,941	35.3	–16.7
Liberal Democrats	2	Steady	12,159	26.9	–5.3
Reform	0	Steady	10,734	23.8	+22.8
Green	0	Steady	4,367	9.7	+7.4
Labour	0	Steady	1,868	4.1	–4.9
Independent	0	Steady	63	0.1	–0.3
Libertarian	0	Steady	26	0.1	N/A
Total	7	Steady	45,242	44.9	
Registered electors			100,801	–	

==== Division results ====
Andover North
Party	Candidate	Votes	%	±%
Conservative	Kirsty North	1,828	35.6	−21.6
Reform	Vincent McGarry	1,507	29.3	N/A
Green	Tom Waddington	772	15.0	N/A
Liberal Democrats	Jason Sangster	734	14.2	−1.7
Labour	Geoff McBride	298	5.8	−11.0
Turnout		5,157	34.1	+8.1
Rejected ballots		18	0.3	
Registered electors		15,104		
Conservative hold				

Andover South
Party	Candidate	Votes	%	±%
Conservative	Zilliah Brooks	1,858	31.3	−26.9
Reform	Richard Davis	1,695	28.5	+26.8
Liberal Democrats	Luigi Gregori	914	15.4	+0.7
Green	Rachel Pattinson-West	812	13.7	+6.1
Labour	Andy Fitchet	570	9.6	−0.6
Independent	William Jackson	63	1.1	N/A
Libertarian	Christopher Ecclestone	26	0.4	N/A
Turnout		5,945	41.1	+7.1
Registered electors		14,480		
Conservative hold				

Andover West
Party	Candidate	Votes	%	±%
Conservative	Chris Donnelly	2,220	37.2	−19.3
Reform	Harry Sheffield	1,740	29.2	N/A
Liberal Democrats	Robin Hughes	1,200	20.1	−2.4
Green	Alan Wright	551	9.2	N/A
Labour	Philippa Roll	254	4.2	−8.1
Turnout		5,979	41.6	+8.6
Rejected ballots		12	0.2	
Registered electors		14,362		
Conservative hold				

Baddesley
Party	Candidate	Votes	%	±%
Liberal Democrats	Sally Yalden	3,127	48.9	−12.2
Reform	Peter Lazic	1,354	21.2	+18.8
Conservative	Nigel Nicholson	1,257	19.7	−10.2
Green	Mike Munro	485	7.6	N/A
Labour	Sarah Fearn	171	2.7	−3.9
Turnout		6,407	48.9	+7.9
Rejected ballots		13	0.2	
Registered electors		13,092		
Liberal Democrats hold				

Romsey Rural
Party	Candidate	Votes	%	±%
Conservative	Nick Adams-King	3,999	49.6	−17.5
Liberal Democrats	Victoria Burbidge	1,740	21.6	−3.4
Reform	Gary Cooper	1,623	20.1	N/A
Green	Matthew Smith	503	6.2	N/A
Labour	Adrian Field	199	2.5	−5.3
Turnout		8,072	50.8	+7.8
Rejected ballots		8	0.1	
Registered electors		15,883		
Conservative hold		Swing	▼7.1	

Romsey Town
Party	Candidate	Votes	%	±%
Liberal Democrats	Sandra Gidley	3,241	47.1	−5.7
Conservative	Tim Mayer	1,638	23.8	−13.1
Reform	Christina Pointer	1,322	19.2	+16.6
Green	Neil Judd	548	8.0	N/A
Labour	James Owen	138	2.0	−5.6
Turnout		6,903	51.6	+6.6
Rejected ballots		15	0.2	
Registered electors		13,367		
Liberal Democrats hold				

Test Valley Central
Party	Candidate	Votes	%	±%
Conservative	David Drew	3,141	46.4	−13.0
Reform	Linda Sheffield	1,493	22.0	N/A
Liberal Democrats	Bud Pollard	1,203	17.7	−6.8
Green	Connor Shaw	696	10.3	+2.4
Labour	Tessa Valentine	238	3.5	−2.0
Turnout		6,779	46.7	+5.7
Rejected ballots		8	0.1	
Registered electors		14,513		
Conservative hold				

=== Winchester (7 seats) ===
==== City summary ====
Winchester city summary
Party	Seats	+/-	Votes	%	+/-
Liberal Democrats	7	▲3	20,782	42.2	+4.7
Conservative	0	▼2	11,146	22.6	–23.4
Reform	0	Steady	8,828	17.9	+17.7
Green	0	▼1	7,293	14.8	+3.9
Labour	0	Steady	954	1.9	–2.5
Independent	0	Steady	175	0.4	–0.3
Wessex Regionalists	0	Steady	49	0.1	N/A
Total	7	Steady	50,115	50.0	
Registered electors			100,137	–	

==== Division results ====
Bishops Waltham
Party	Candidate	Votes	%	±%
Liberal Democrats	Jonathan Williams	2,811	37.5	+13.9
Conservative	Neil Bolton	1,824	24.3	−32.6
Reform	Peter Jordan	1,446	19.3	N/A
Green	Liam Bailey-Morgan	1,286	17.2	+4.0
Labour	Steve Haines	124	1.6	−4.6
Turnout		7,520	51.7	+6.7
Rejected ballots		20	0.3	
Registered electors		14,553		
Liberal Democrats hold		Swing	▲23.3	

Itchen Valley
Party	Candidate	Votes	%	±%
Liberal Democrats	Jackie Porter	3,985	58.3	+6.6
Reform	Nicholas Hubbard	1,192	17.4	+16.1
Conservative	Signe Biddle	1,087	15.9	−24.0
Green	Tom Street	475	6.9	+2.0
Labour	Jamie Trodden	96	1.4	−0.9
Turnout		7,587	53.0	±0.0
Rejected ballots		27	0.4	
Registered electors		14,316		
Liberal Democrats hold				

Meon Valley
Party	Candidate	Votes	%	±%
Liberal Democrats	Anne Small	2,242	29.6	+9.3
Green	Malcolm Wallace	1,892	25.0	+1.8
Reform	Charlotte Northbrook	1,675	22.1	N/A
Conservative	Alex Rennie	1,488	19.6	−32.2
Independent	Sean Whelan	175	2.3	N/A
Labour	Martyn Davis	106	1.4	−3.3
Turnout		7,606	46.2	+2.2
Rejected ballots		21		
Registered electors		16,472		
Liberal Democrats gain from Green		Swing	▲3.8	

Winchester Downlands
Party	Candidate	Votes	%	±%
Liberal Democrats	James Batho	3,380	41.7	+6.5
Conservative	Jan Warwick	2,891	35.7	−18.5
Reform	Lincoln Redding	994	12.3	N/A
Green	Jacob Battison	703	8.7	+1.9
Labour	Alison Cochrane	138	1.7	−2.1
Turnout		8,124	55.7	+2.7
Rejected ballots		13	0.2	
Registered electors		14,588		
Liberal Democrats gain from Conservative				

Winchester Eastgate
Party	Candidate	Votes	%	±%
Liberal Democrats	Paula Ferguson	2,850	46.2	−2.2
Green	Lorraine Estelle	1,223	19.8	+10.3
Conservative	Ian Tait	1,145	18.6	−13.7
Reform	Sukhdev Raj	741	12.0	N/A
Labour	Patrick Davies	160	2.6	−5.2
Wessex Regionalists	James Crabb	49	0.8	N/A
Turnout		6,186	47.0	+3.0
Rejected ballots		13		
Registered electors		13,165		
Liberal Democrats hold		Swing	▼6.3	

Winchester Southern Parishes
Party	Candidate	Votes	%	±%
Liberal Democrats	Angela Clear	2,248	33.7	+4.3
Reform	Amanda Aldridge	2,090	31.3	N/A
Conservative	Paula Langford-Smith	1,631	24.4	−34.8
Green	Ben Thomas	540	8.1	−3.3
Labour	Margaret Rees	162	2.4	N/A
Turnout		6,698	46.8	+8.8
Rejected ballots		24	0.4	
Registered electors		14,318		
Liberal Democrats gain from Conservative				

Winchester Westgate
Party	Candidate	Votes	%	±%
Liberal Democrats	Martin Tod	3,266	51.2	+1.6
Green	Simon Warde	1,174	18.4	+8.1
Conservative	Caroline Horrill	1,080	16.9	−12.3
Reform	Mark Adams	690	10.8	N/A
Labour	Lucy Sims	168	2.6	−3.1
Turnout		6,394	50.2	+1.2
Rejected ballots		10	0.2	
Registered electors		12,725		
Liberal Democrats hold		Swing	▼3.3	
