= John Bankes (died 1714) =

British Tory politician

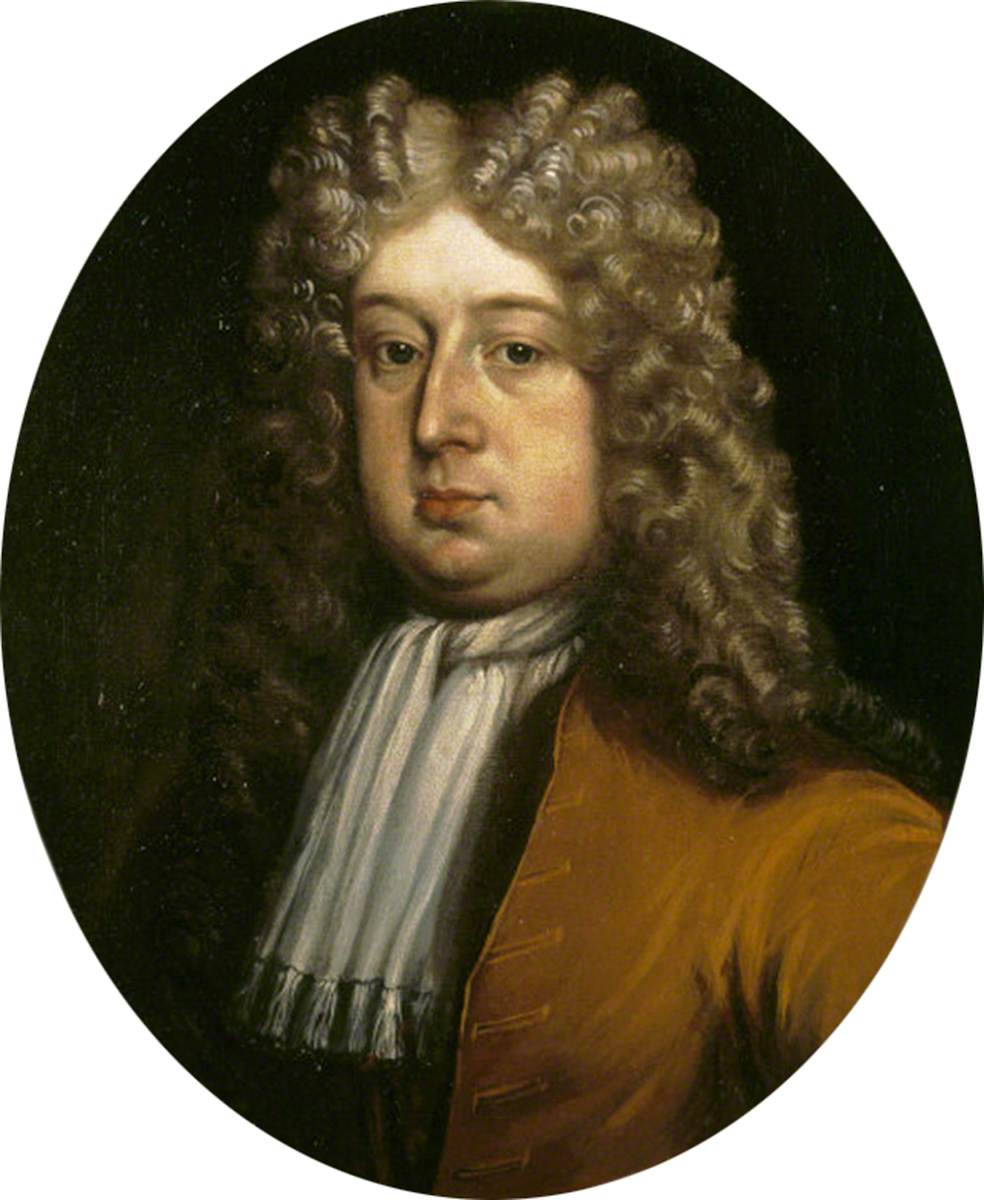
John Bankes, portrait by William Reader

John Bankes (1665 – 14 July 1714) was a British Tory politician, who served as Member of Parliament for Corfe Castle.

== Life ==
Bankes was the son of Sir Ralph Bankes MP (son of Sir John Bankes, Chief Justice of the Common Pleas) and his wife Mary, daughter of John Brune.

In 1691, Bankes married Margaret, daughter of Sir Henry Parker Bt MP. Two of their sons, John and Henry, went on to serve as MP for Corfe Castle.

Bankes first stood at Corfe Castle – a family seat, which his father had previously represented – in the 1698 general election. The election was contested, and Bankes survived a petition from the losing candidate for voting irregularities. Bankes and Richard Fownes were returned unopposed at every subsequent election until they both died in 1714.

Bankes was also hereditary constable of Corfe Castle and hereditary Lord Lieutenant of the Isle of Purbeck.

On 14 July 1714, Bankes was attempting to lift a blunderbuss hanging on his bedroom wall at Kingston Lacy when it discharged, shooting him fatally through the head. He was buried at Wimborne Minster.
