= John Jenkinson (British politician) =

British Army officer, courtier and Member of Parliament

Captain John Robert Jenkinson (1734? – 1 May 1805) was a British Army officer, courtier and Member of Parliament.

He was born the third son of Colonel Charles Jenkinson and was the younger brother of Charles Jenkinson, 1st Earl of Liverpool. He was educated at the Charterhouse School.

As a courtier he was a Page of Honour to King George II from 1748 to 1752, a gentleman usher to the Queen from 1761 to his death, the second (or Ulster) secretary to the Lord Lieutenant in Ireland for 1773–75 and joint secretary to the Lord Lieutenant in England in 1775.

As a soldier he was a Cornet in the 2nd Troop of Horse Guards in 1752 and a captain in 1762. He then transferred as a captain to the 12th Dragoons in 1765 before retiring in 1773.

He sat as Member of Parliament for Corfe Castle between 1768 and 1780.

He died in Winchester in 1805. He had married, in 1778, Frances, the daughter of Rear-Admiral John Barker, and had four sons and a daughter. One son was Sir Charles Jenkinson, 10th Baronet, a second son was John Jenkinson, Bishop of St David's. Their daughter Frances married Sir William Boothby, 8th Baronet.

Parliament of Great Britain
Preceded by John Bond; John Campbell	Member of Parliament for Corfe Castle; 1768–1780; With: John Bond	Succeeded by John Bond; Henry Bankes
