= John Bond (1678–1744) =

English lawyer and politician

John Bond (5 April 1678 – 19 June 1744), of Tyneham in Dorset, was an English lawyer and a politician who sat in the House of Commons, from 1721 to 1744.

== Early life ==
Bond was a second son of Nathaniel Bond, of Creech Grange, Dorset, a King's Serjeant and MP. His elder brother was Denis, who was also an MP. He was admitted at Inner Temple to study law in 1697, and was called to the bar in 1706. He married his cousin, Margaret Williams (died 1775), daughter of John Williams of Herringston, Dorset on 19 March 1716.

== Career ==
Bond was returned as a stop-gap Member of Parliament for Corfe Castle at a by-election on 25 February 1721, when his brother was the borough's other MP. He did not stand at the 1722 general election but replaced his brother, who became MP for Poole, at the 1727 general election. He voted against the Government on the Hessians in 1730, but from then on supported the Government when present. In 1732, a report of a House of Commons committee named him as being involved with his brother in the fraudulent sale of the forfeited Derwentwater estates in 1723, but no action was taken. He was returned unopposed at the 1734 general election. In 1737, he was made a bencher of his Inn. He was returned unopposed for Corfe Castle again in 1741.

== Death and legacy ==
Bond died on 19 June 1744. He and his wife had four sons and two daughters. Their son, John (1717–1784), was also an MP and, as his uncle's heir, became head of the family. His grandson Nathaniel Bond was also an MP for Corfe Castle.

Parliament of Great Britain
Preceded by Denis Bond; Joshua Churchill	Member of Parliament for Corfe Castle; 1721–1722; With: Denis Bond	Succeeded by Denis Bond; John Bankes
Preceded by Denis Bond; John Bankes	Member of Parliament for Corfe Castle; 1727–1744; With: John Bankes (1727–1741) with Henry Bankes (1741–1744)	Succeeded by Thomas Erle Drax; Henry Bankes
