= Cosmo Gordon =

Scottish politician and agricultural improver

Cosmo Gordon of Cluny FRSE (1736–1800) was a Scottish politician, agricultural improver and co-founder of the Royal Society of Edinburgh. He sat in the House of Commons from 1774 to 1777 and was a Baron of the Scottish Court of Exchequer from 1777 until his death. He was for several years Rector of Marischal College in Aberdeen.

== Life ==
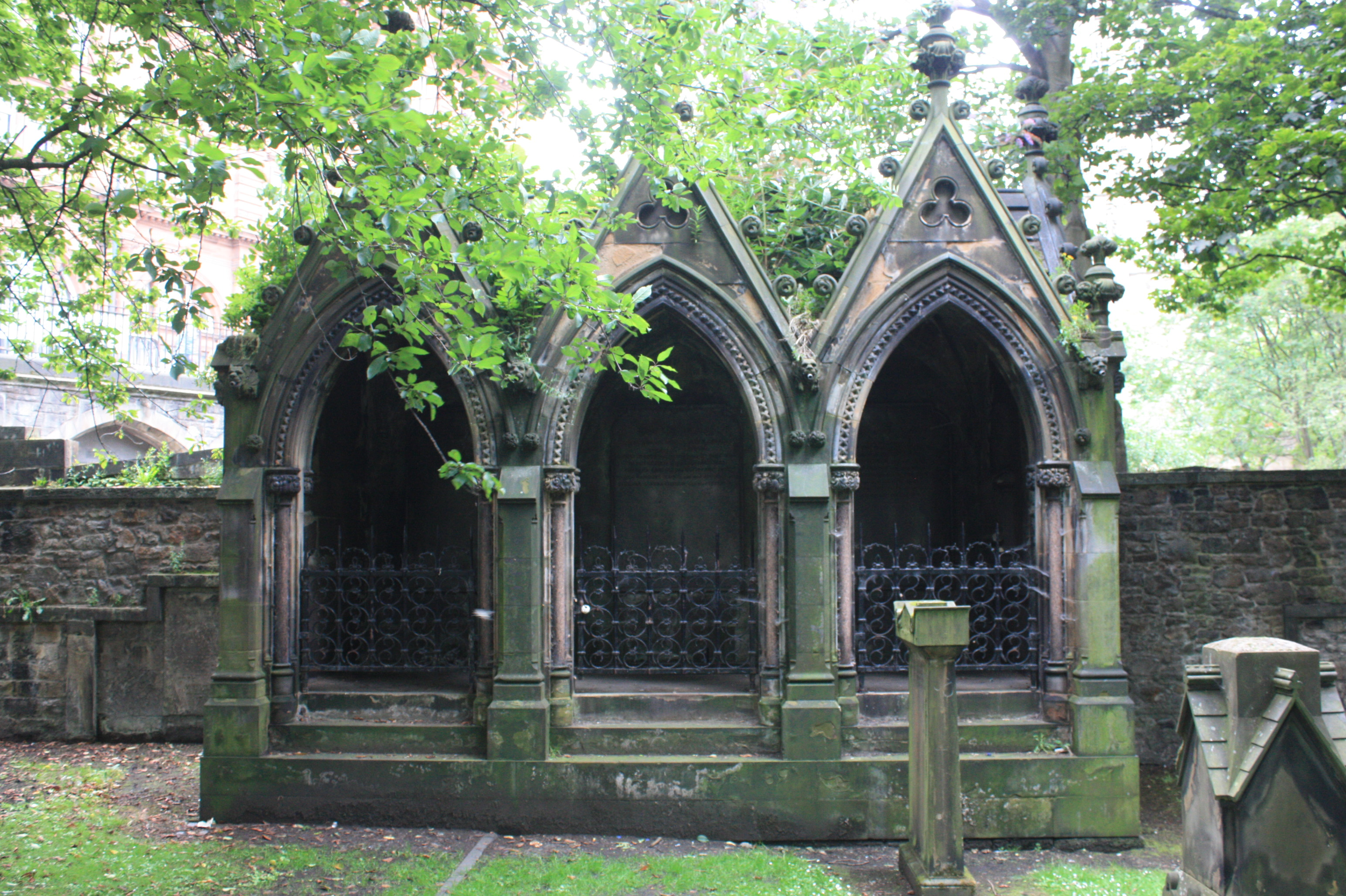
The grave of Cosmo Gordon, St Cuthbert's Churchyard, Edinburgh

Gordon was the eldest son of John Gordon of Cluny (died 1769), a former Edinburgh merchant, and estate factor to Cosmo Gordon, 3rd Duke of Gordon who had bought Cluny Castle with monies from leasing salmon fishing rights on the River Spey on the Duke’s estate.

Gordon studied law at Marischal College in Aberdeen 1749 to 1753 and was created an advocate in 1758. In 1763 he bought the Kinsteary estate in Nairnshire and in 1769 inherited the Cluny estate on the death of his father.

In 1774 he succeeded Sir William Pulteney, 5th Baronet as Member of Parliament for Nairnshire. Whilst in office he strongly supported the war against America. In 1777 the prime minister, Frederick North, Lord North created him a Baron of the Scottish Exchequer, a prestigious and well-paid role which after his death was filled by George Buchanan Hepburn.

Gordon was a man of strong character, a friend of Lord Monboddo and James Boswell. In 1783, along with many Edinburgh literati, he co-founded the Royal Society of Edinburgh, serving as their Literary President. He was Rector of Marischal College (now the University of Aberdeen) from 1782 to 1788.

Gordon died on 22 November 1800 at his now demolished townhouse at 4 St Andrew Square in Edinburgh and was buried in a highly ornate Gothic family vault in the churchyard of St Cuthbert's Church, Edinburgh. He lies in the eastmost section of the vault, which is to the north-west of the churchyard.

Gordon had married Mary Baillie, daughter of Henry Baillie of Carnbroe, on 30 June 1786. She died in 1791 and he did not remarry. Being childless, his estates passed on his death to his younger brother Charles Gordon of Braid (died 1815) and from there to Charles’ son, John Gordon of Cluny (died 1858).

== Family ==
Cosmo’s youngest brother Alexander Gordon made a fortune in the plantations of Tobago.

== Publications ==
- On The Dutch Herring Fishery

Parliament of Great Britain
Preceded by Pryse Campbell	Member of Parliament for Nairnshire; 1774 – 1777	Succeeded by John Campbell
