= John Bankes (died 1772) =

British Tory politician

John Bankes (died 1772) of Kingston Lacy, Dorset, was a British Tory politician who sat in the House of Commons from 1722 to 1741.

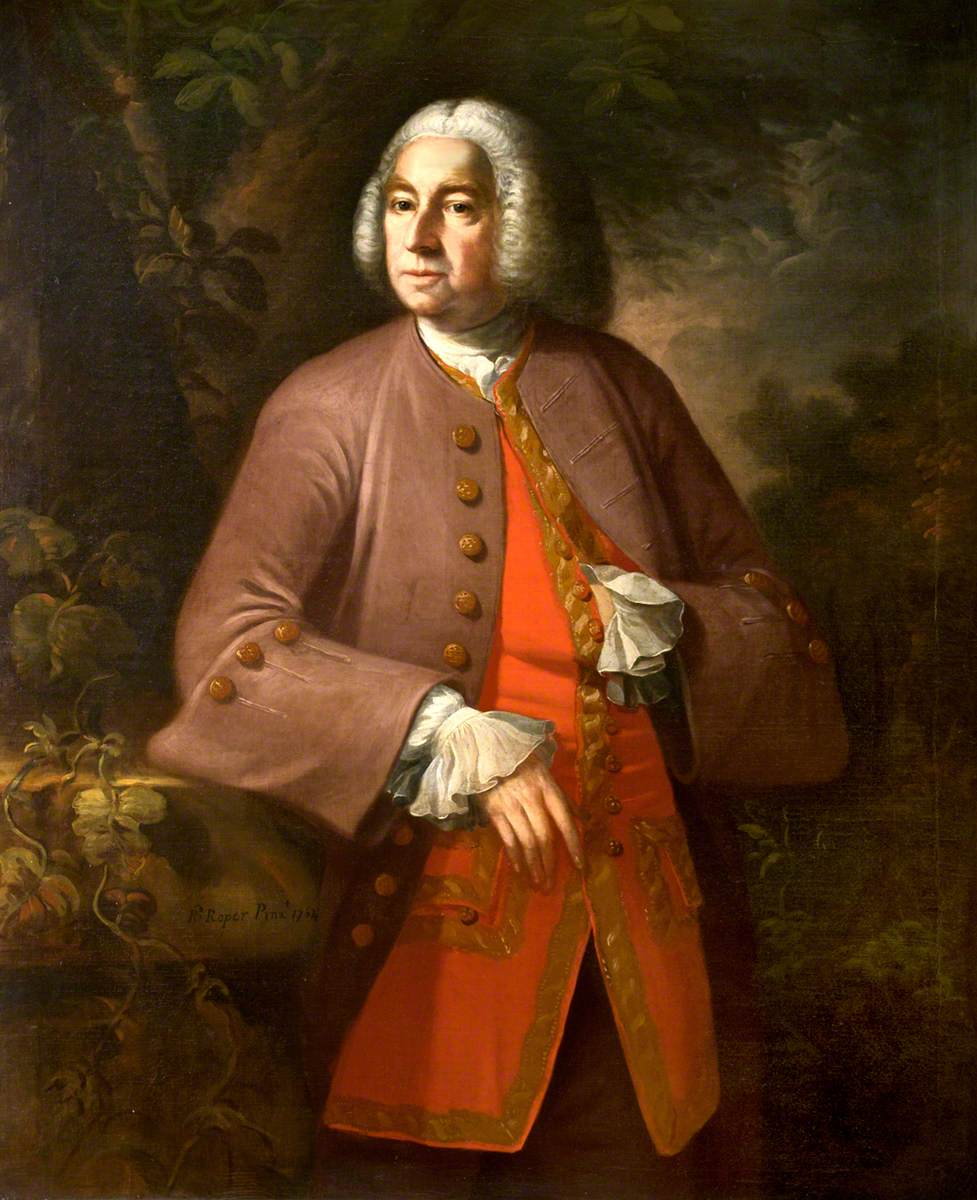
John Bankes by Richard Roper

Bankes was the eldest son of John Bankes, MP of Kingston Lacy and Corfe Castle, and great-grandson of Sir John Bankes, MP and chief justice of the common pleas, who acquired the manor and castle of Corfe in 1635. He succeeded his father who died in 1714.

At the 1715 general election, Bankes stood as a Tory at Corfe Castle, which had been his father's seat, but was unsuccessful. He was also defeated there at a by-election in 1718, being involved in a double return. He was finally returned at the 1722 general election and was subsequently returned unopposed in 1727 and 1734. He voted against the Government in every recorded division except on the motion for Walpole's removal in February 1741. At the 1741 general election, he gave up his seat for his brother Henry and did not stand for parliament again.

Bankes died unmarried on 26 January 1772.

Parliament of Great Britain
Preceded by Denis Bond; John Bond	Member of Parliament for Corfe Castle; 1722–1741; With: Denis Bond; John Bond 1727	Succeeded by John Bond; Henry Bankes
