= John Banks (activist) =

English political activist and writer

John Croisdale Banks (June 1915 – 16 January 2010) was an English political activist and writer, noted for his work on the territorial aspects of constitutional reform.

== Early life ==
Banks was born in Kent in June 1915. He was educated at Chatham House Grammar School, Ramsgate (1929–1934), and the University of London, from where he graduated (BSc (Econ)) in June 1936. Between 1936 and 1939 he lectured for the Workers' Educational Association in east Kent and was active in the Left Book Club from 1937.

== Military service ==
Banks was embodied in the Royal Artillery (Territorial Army) in August 1939, embarking for the Middle East as Quartermaster in December 1940. In March 1942 he transferred to the Army Educational Corps and was commissioned in July 1942. Between September 1942 and March 1944 he served as Staff Captain at GHQ Middle East Forces, Cairo, where he was Middle East editor of the Army publications Current Affairs, War and British Way and Purpose. He saw service with 3 Corps (Palestine), 56 London Division (Italy) and 5 Corps (Italy) between March 1944 and April 1945. Following postings to Liverpool, Tenby and London District (May 1945 to February 1946), he was discharged in the rank of Major.

== Academic career ==
From February 1946 to September 1948, Banks was employed as Research Officer by the Institute of the Motor Industry. He then took up a post as Lecturer (later Senior Lecturer, then Principal Lecturer) in Public Administration at Kingston Technical College (later Kingston College of Technology), where he remained until 1969. After a year as Head of the School of Business, Kingston Polytechnic, he became Reader in Public Administration at the University of the South Pacific (1970–1974). He returned to Kingston Polytechnic as Head of Learning Resources from 1975 until his retirement in 1977.

== Political work ==
Banks joined the Common Wealth Party (Services Section) in 1943, taking part in the 1945 General Election in support of CW candidates. He served CW as General Secretary (November 1946 to April 1955), Chairman of the National Committee (April 1955 to May 1959) and as editor of The Libertarian (later CW Journal) from December 1979 until the party's dissolution in 1993.

Banks' special interest has been the territorial aspects of constitutional reform. He co-wrote (with Gwynfor Evans, Robert McIntyre and others) Our Three Nations, issued jointly by CW, Plaid Cymru and the Scottish National Party in 1956. This advocated regional devolution within an independent, post-colonial England. The only published book of which he was sole author was Federal Britain?, sub-titled 'The Case for Regionalism' (1971). With the exception of Cornwall, the regions defined in the book were based on Derek Senior's 1969 map of 'city-regions', in turn based on commuting patterns. Banks subsequently repudiated this approach, in favour of historically-based regions.

In 1980 he was introduced to the Wessex Regionalist Party, where he helped edit The Statute of Wessex, the party's draft constitution for their region, before contesting the Westbury seat in the 1983 General Election. He polled 131 votes (0.2%), finishing last of five candidates. From 1982 to 1990 he was editor of The Regionalist, reporting on Home Rule campaigns from Shetland to Cornwall and beyond. He afterwards served as the Secretary-General of the Wessex Regionalists and later as the party's President.

Banks retired from active political life in his late 80s. He died in January 2010 at the age of 94 in Coventry, Warwickshire.

== Family connections ==
Banks' stepdaughter, Clare Banks, is a BBC radio journalist and newsreader.

== Reading ==
- Evans, Gwynfor; Lewis, Roy A.; Jones, J.E.; Donaldson, Arthur; Rollo, David R.; MacIntyre, Robert; Banks, John C.; Stuckey, Douglas; Bannister, Don (1956). Our Three Nations. Cardiff: Plaid Cymru.
- Banks, John C. (1971). Federal Britain?. London: George G. Harrap & Co. Ltd. ISBN 0-245-50378-1.
- Banks, John C. (1986). The Regionalist (No. 8). Houghton-le-Spring: John Ellis. ISSN 0264-522X.
- Wessex Regionalists (1996). The Statute of Wessex. Cheltenham: Wessex Regionalists. ISBN 0-9508721-0-5.
