= John Bond (1753–1824) =

British politician

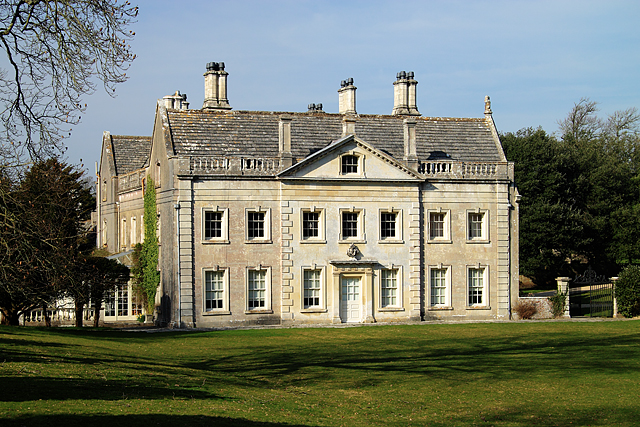
Creech Grange, Dorset

John Bond (24 July 1753 – 12 May 1824) was a British politician.

He was the eldest son of John Bond, was educated at Winchester College and Magdalene College, Cambridge (1771) and studied law at the Inner Temple (1773), being called to the bar in 1779. He succeeded his father, including to Creech Grange, Dorset on 30 May 1784.

He was the Member of Parliament (MP) for Corfe Castle from 9 September 1780 to 25 February 1801. He resigned from Parliament by accepting the post of Steward of the Chiltern Hundreds. He was appointed High Sheriff of Cardiganshire for 1804–05.

He married Elizabeth, the daughter and heiress of John Lloyd of Cefn-y-Coed, Cardiganshire; they had 2 sons and 2 daughters.
