= Hampshire County Council =

British administrative body and municipal art collection

- Depiction of Coat of arms

Type
- Type: Non-metropolitan county

History
- Founded: 1 April 1889

Leadership
- Chair: Pal Hayre, Conservative since 21 May 2026
- Leader: Nick Adams-King, Conservative since 23 May 2024
- Chief executive: Gary Westbrook since 4 August 2025

Structure
- Seats: 78 councillors
- Graph of the party split among 78 seats.
- Political groups: Administration (28) Conservative (27) Whitehill & Bordon Community Party (1) Other parties (50) Liberal Democrats (26) Reform UK (20) Labour (1) Community Campaign (Hart) (1) Green (1) Independent (1)
- Length of term: 4 years

Elections
- Voting system: First past the post
- Last election: 7 May 2026

Meeting place
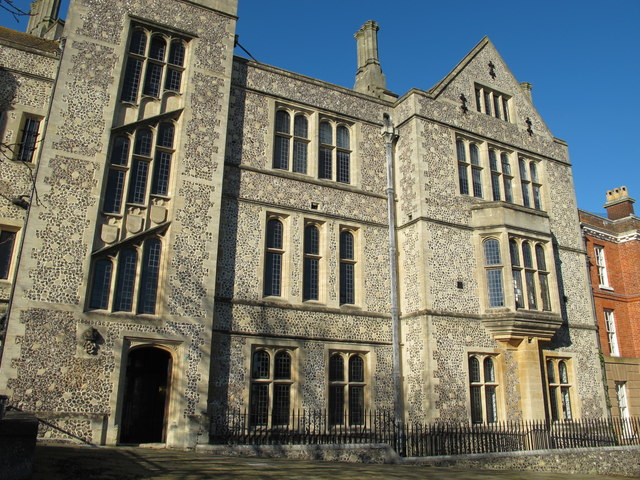
- The Castle, Upper High Street, Winchester, SO23 8UJ

Website
- hants.gov.uk

Hampshire County Council (HCC) is the upper-tier local authority for the non-metropolitan county of Hampshire in England. The council was created in 1889. The county council provides county-level services to eleven of the thirteen districts geographically located within the ceremonial county of Hampshire. The county council acts as the upper tier of local government to approximately 1.4 million people. It is one of 21 county councils in England.

Whilst they form part of the ceremonial county of Hampshire, the two cities of Southampton and Portsmouth are unitary authorities, independent from Hampshire County Council. The county council comprises 78 elected councillors, who meet in the city of Winchester, which is the county town.

The council has been under no overall control since the 2026 election, being run by a Conservative-led administration with the Whitehill & Bordon Community Party councillor being appointed to the council's cabinet.

In 2026, the council became a member of the Hampshire and the Solent Combined County Authority.

== History ==
Elected county councils were created in 1889 under the Local Government Act 1888, taking over many administrative functions that had previously been performed by unelected magistrates at the Quarter Sessions. The boroughs of Portsmouth and Southampton were both considered large enough to provide their own county-level services, so they became county boroughs, independent from the county council. The county council was elected by and provided services to the remainder of the county outside those two boroughs, which area was termed the administrative county.

The first elections were held in January 1889, and the council formally came into being on 1 April 1889, on which day it held its first official meeting at Winchester Castle. George Sclater-Booth, Lord Basing, a Conservative peer and former Member of Parliament, was appointed the first chairman of the council.

The Isle of Wight was covered by Hampshire County Council when it was created in 1889, but soon after it was decided that the island should have its own county council, and so it was made a separate administrative county with effect from 1 April 1890. Bournemouth was made a county borough in 1900, removing it from the administrative county of Hampshire.

The council's legal name until 1959 was the "County Council of the County of Southampton", although the name "Hampshire County Council" was used informally from the council's creation in 1889. The name was officially changed to Hampshire County Council with effect from 1 April 1959.

Local government was reformed in 1974 under the Local Government Act 1972, which made Hampshire a non-metropolitan county. As part of the 1974 reforms it ceded an area in the south-west of the county including Christchurch to Dorset, but the county council gained authority over Portsmouth and Southampton. The lower tier of local government was rearranged at the same time, with the county being divided into thirteen non-metropolitan districts.

The council was granted a coat of arms in 1992.

In 1997 Portsmouth and Southampton regained their independence from the county council when they were made unitary authorities following a review by Local Government Commission for England. They remain part of the ceremonial county of Hampshire for the purposes of lieutenancy. In 2015 the Hampshire and Isle of Wight Local Government Association unanimously agreed to support a 'pan-Hampshire' combined authority, but the bid was eventually unsuccessful.

In November 2022, the county council warned it may face bankruptcy within 12 months due to austerity cuts, alongside similar warnings from Kent County Council.

In 2026, the council became a member of the Hampshire and the Solent Combined County Authority.

In March 2026, the government announced local government reorganisation plans, which would have seen the county council abolished in 2028 and local government across Hampshire reorganised into four unitary authorities. These proposals were withdrawn in September 2026.

== Governance ==
Hampshire County Council provides county-level services. District-level services are provided by the area's eleven district councils.

The county council has authority over the pink area, formally called the non-metropolitan county. The wider ceremonial county of Hampshire additionally includes the two unitary authorities of Southampton (8) and Portsmouth (12) shown in yellow.

The ceremonial county is divided into thirteen districts, with the county council having responsibility for the eleven districts excluding the two unitary authorities of Portsmouth and Southampton, which area is formally called the non-metropolitan county.

1. Test Valley
2. Basingstoke and Deane
3. Hart
4. Rushmoor
5. Winchester
6. East Hampshire
7. New Forest
8. Southampton (unitary)
9. Eastleigh
10. Fareham
11. Gosport
12. Portsmouth (unitary)
13. Havant

=== Political control ===
The council went under no overall control at the 2026 election, prior to which it was under Conservative majority control since 1997. The Conservatives remain the largest party on the council and lead the council's administration alongside the "Independent Group" of four councillors.

Political control of the council since the 1974 reforms has been as follows:

Party in control	Years
No overall control	1974–1977
Conservative	1977–1985
No overall control	1985–1989
Conservative	1989–1993
No overall control	1993–1997
Conservative	1997–2026
No overall control	2026-Present

=== Leadership ===
The leaders of the council since 1976 have been:

Councillor	Party	From	To
Freddie Emery-Wallis	Conservative	1976	1993
Mike Hancock	Liberal Democrats	1993	1997
Freddie Emery-Wallis	Conservative	1997	1999
Ken Thornber	Conservative	1999	May 2013
Roy Perry	Conservative	23 May 2013	17 May 2019
Keith Mans	Conservative	17 May 2019	19 May 2022
Rob Humby	Conservative	19 May 2022	23 May 2024
Nick Adams-King	Conservative	23 May 2024	

=== Composition ===
Following the 2026 election, the composition of the council was:

Party	Councillors
Conservative	27
Liberal Democrats	26
Reform	20
Community Campaign	1
Green	1
Labour	1
WBCP	1
Independent	1
Total	78

The independent councillor, the Green councillor and the councillors for the local parties Community Campaign (Hart) and the Whitehill and Bordon Community Party sit together as the "Independent Group". The group leader is the Whitehill & Bordon Community Party and the deputy leader of the group serves as vice chairman of the council. However, the Independent Group is not itself part of a coalition administration and nor does it offer confidence and supply with only the Whitehill & Bordon Community Party member serving in the council's cabinet as part of the administration.

== Premises ==
The council's main offices and meeting place are at Winchester Castle, parts of which date back to 1067. The council's part of the castle complex is known as Castle Hill and comprises more recent buildings added to the historic castle site, notably in 1895, 1912 and 1933. The council also has area offices in Basingstoke, Farnborough, Havant and Totton.

== Elections ==
Since the last boundary changes in 2017 the council has comprised 78 councillors, representing 76 electoral divisions, with two divisions electing two councillors and the rest electing one each. Elections are held every four years. In February 2025, the government postponed the elections that were due to take place in May 2025 for a year, to allow for alternative local government structures for the area to be considered.

== Notable members ==
- Henry Paulet, 16th Marquess of Winchester, Chairman 1904–1909
- James Harris, 5th Earl of Malmesbury, Chairman 1927–1937
- Sir Charles Chute, Baronet, Chairman 1938–1955
- Sir John Crowder, member 1931–1946
- Francis Manners, 4th Baron Manners
- Horace King, Baron Maybray-King, member 1946–1965
- John Denham, member 1981–1989, later a member of parliament
- Mike Hancock, Leader 1989–1997, later a member of parliament
- Henry Herbert, 7th Earl of Carnarvon, Chairman 1973–1977
- Alexander Baring, 6th Baron Ashburton, member 1945–1972
- Roy Perry, Leader 2013–2019
- Percivall Pott, elected member, 1949, later member of parliament for Devizes in Wiltshire
