= John Dackombe =

Sir John Dackombe

Chancellor of the Duchy of Lancaster
- In office 1616–1618
- Preceded by: Sir Thomas Parry
- Succeeded by: Sir Humphrey May

Personal details
- Born: 1 January 1570 Dorset, England
- Died: 29 January 1618 (aged 48) England
- Spouse: Lady Melior Pitt
- Relations: Richard Dackombe (father)

Sir John Dackombe (1 January 1570 – 29 January 1618) was a Member of Parliament and Chancellor of the Duchy of Lancaster.

He was born the eldest son of Richard Dackombe of Motcombe, Dorset and educated at the Middle Temple (1596). He succeeded his father in 1600 and was knighted in 1616.

He held a number of public offices, including those of Master of Requests (1613–16) and Chancellor of the Duchy of Lancaster (1616–18) and was the Member of Parliament for Corfe Castle in the 1614 Addled Parliament.

He married by 1607 Melior, the daughter of John Pitt, mercer, of Blandford Forum, Dorset and the widow of Robert Mohun of Bothenhampton, Dorset. They had 1 son and 2 daughters.
