= Edmund Uvedale (died 1621) =

English politician

Edmund Uvedale (died 1621), of Little Crichel, Dorset, was an English politician.

He was a Member of Parliament (MP) for Corfe Castle in 1572.
