= Henry Bankes =

English politician and author

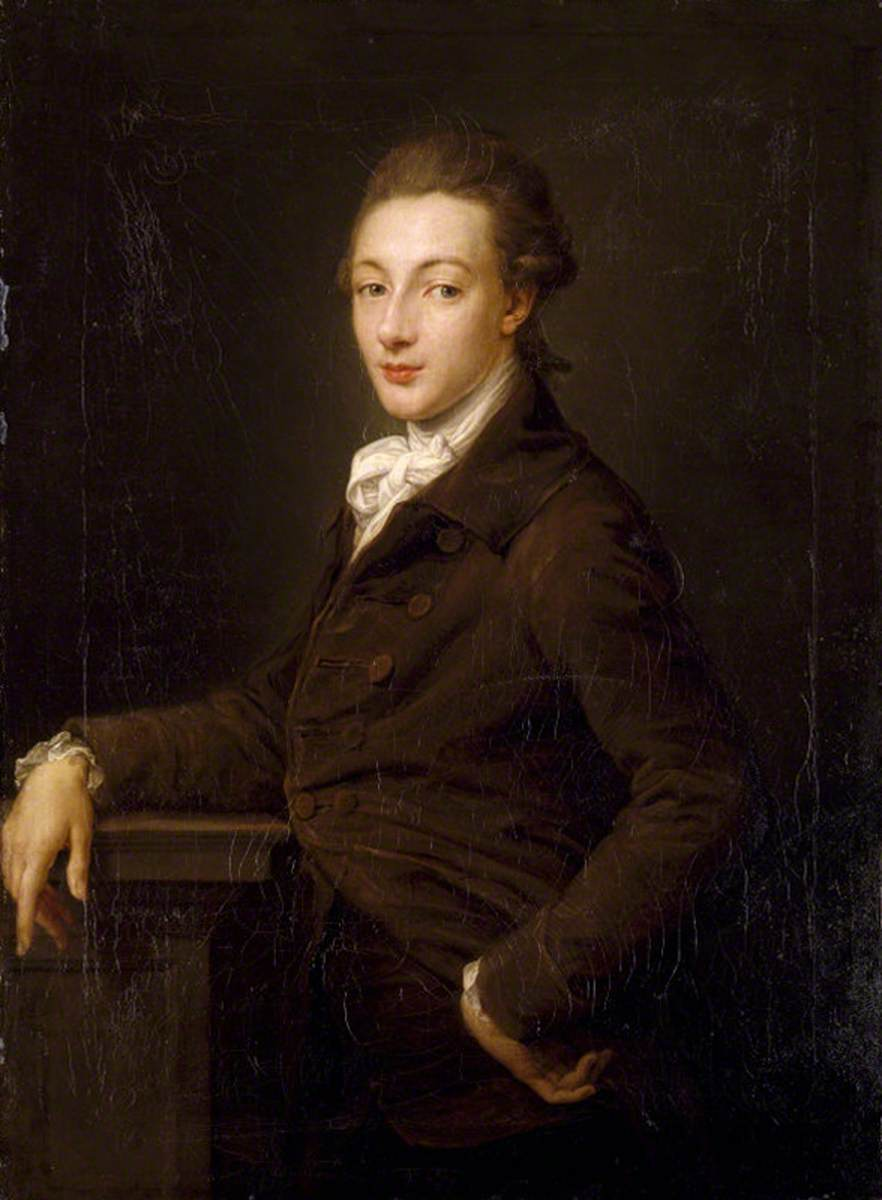
Henry Bankes by Pompeo Batoni, 1779.

Henry Bankes (1757–1834) was an English politician and writer.

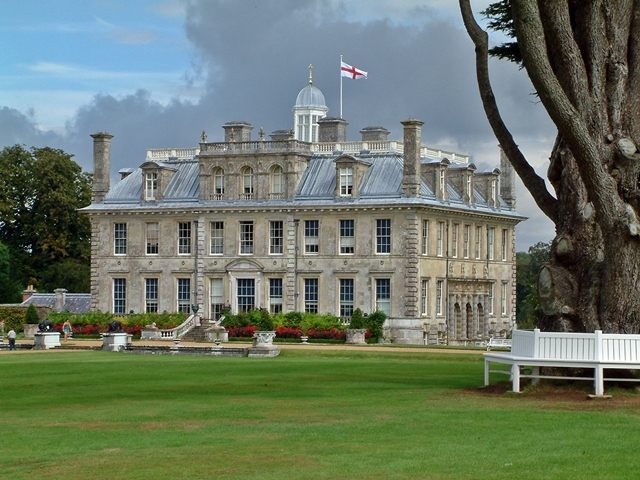
Kingston Lacy House - Seat of the Bankes family

== Life ==
Bankes was the only surviving son of Henry Bankes MP and Margaret Wynne (1724–1822). Bankes was the great-great-grandson of Sir John Bankes, Chief Justice of the Common Pleas in the time of Charles I.

Bankes was educated at Westminster School and Trinity College, Cambridge, where he won the Chancellor's Classical Medal and graduated B.A. as 14th wrangler in 1778 (M.A. in 1781). He then spent three years (October 1778 to October 1781) on a Grand Tour of Europe, which included four months in Venice.

On his father's death in 1776, he inherited the family estate at Kingston Lacy, including a lucrative lead mine in Cumberland.

He represented the close borough of Corfe Castle from 1780 to 1826; in the latter year he was elected for the county of Dorset, and re-elected in the general election in the same year, but was rejected after a severe contest in 1830. In politics he was a conservative; he gave a general support to Prime Minister Pitt, but preserved his independence. He took an active but not a leading part in nearly every debate of his time, and closely attended to all parliamentary duties.

The 1784 Enclosure Act allowed Henry to create the current Kingston Lacy estate and parkland footprint. He demolished the hamlet of Kingston which was situated adjacent to the 16th-century Keeper's Lodge, diverted the Blandford road (now the B3082) and converted former agricultural land to parkland. He undertook further minor alterations in the 1820s.

He was a trustee of the British Museum, and acted as its organ in parliament.

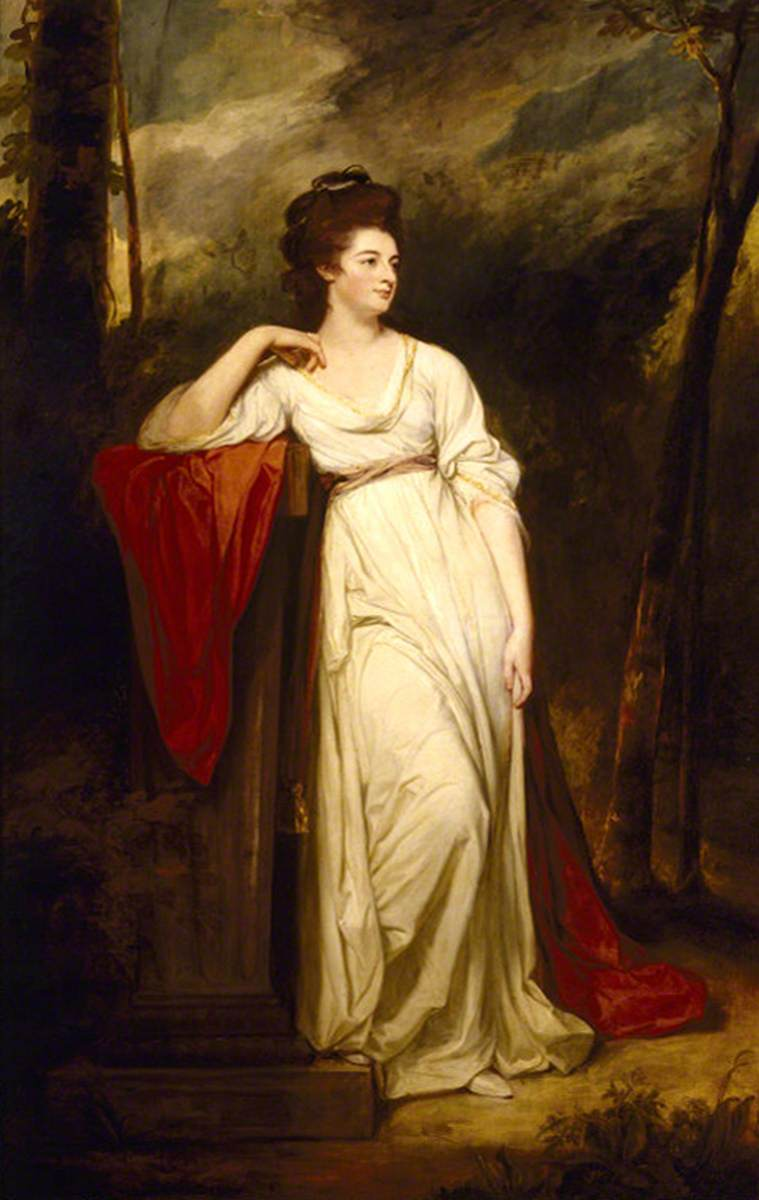
Frances Woodley (1760–1823), Mrs Henry Bankes II, by George Romney 1780-81.

After his marriage, Henry altered Kingston Lacy. The revised layout included the creation of a new entrance on the east side of the building, a new dining room and a large ballroom. In December 1791, the Bankes family held a ball to commemorate the completion of the rooms. Frances Bankes was delighted with the evening. She wrote to her mother-in-law that: "I was perfectly satisfied from beginning to end, you know I am very difficult, but every Creature appeared in high good humour."

When his maternal uncle William Wynne died unmarried in 1815, he left Soughton Hall to John Bankes's son and heir, William John Bankes.

Bankes died at Tregothnan, Cornwall, home of his eldest daughter on 17 December 1834, and was buried at Wimborne Minster. William John Bankes succeeded him and took possession of Kingston Lacy.

== Family ==
On 18 August 1784, Bankes married Frances (1760–1823), daughter of William Woodley, Governor of the Leeward Islands. They had the following children:

- Henry Bankes (1785–1806), drowned in the wrecking of HMS Athenienne
- William John Bankes MP (1786–1855)
- George Bankes MP (1787–1856)
- Anne Frances Bankes (1789–1864), married Edward Boscawen, 1st Earl of Falmouth
- Maria Wynne Bankes (1791–1823), married Thomas Stapleton
- Edward Bankes (1794–1867), Canon of Gloucester and Bristol Cathedrals
- Frederick Woodley Banks (born 1799), believed to have died young, shortly after smallpox inoculation

== Works ==
- A Civil and Constitutional History of Rome, from the Foundation to the Age of Augustus, 2 vols. 1818.

Parliament of Great Britain
Preceded by John Bond; John Jenkinson	Member of Parliament for Corfe Castle; 1780–1826; With: John Bond 1780–1801; Nathaniel Bond 1801–1807; Peter William Baker 1807–1816; George Bankes 1816–1823; John Bond 1823–1826	Succeeded by John Bond; George Bankes
Preceded by Edward Portman; William Morton Pitt	Member of Parliament for Dorset; 1826–1831; With: Edward Portman	Succeeded by Edward Portmand; John Calcraft
