= Edward Dackombe =

MP for Corfe Castle
- In office 1625–1626
- In office 1604–1611

Personal details
- Born: 22 June 1579
- Died: December 1635 (aged 56)

Edward Dackombe (22 June 1579 – December 1635) was an English member of parliament.
