= Ralph Bankes =

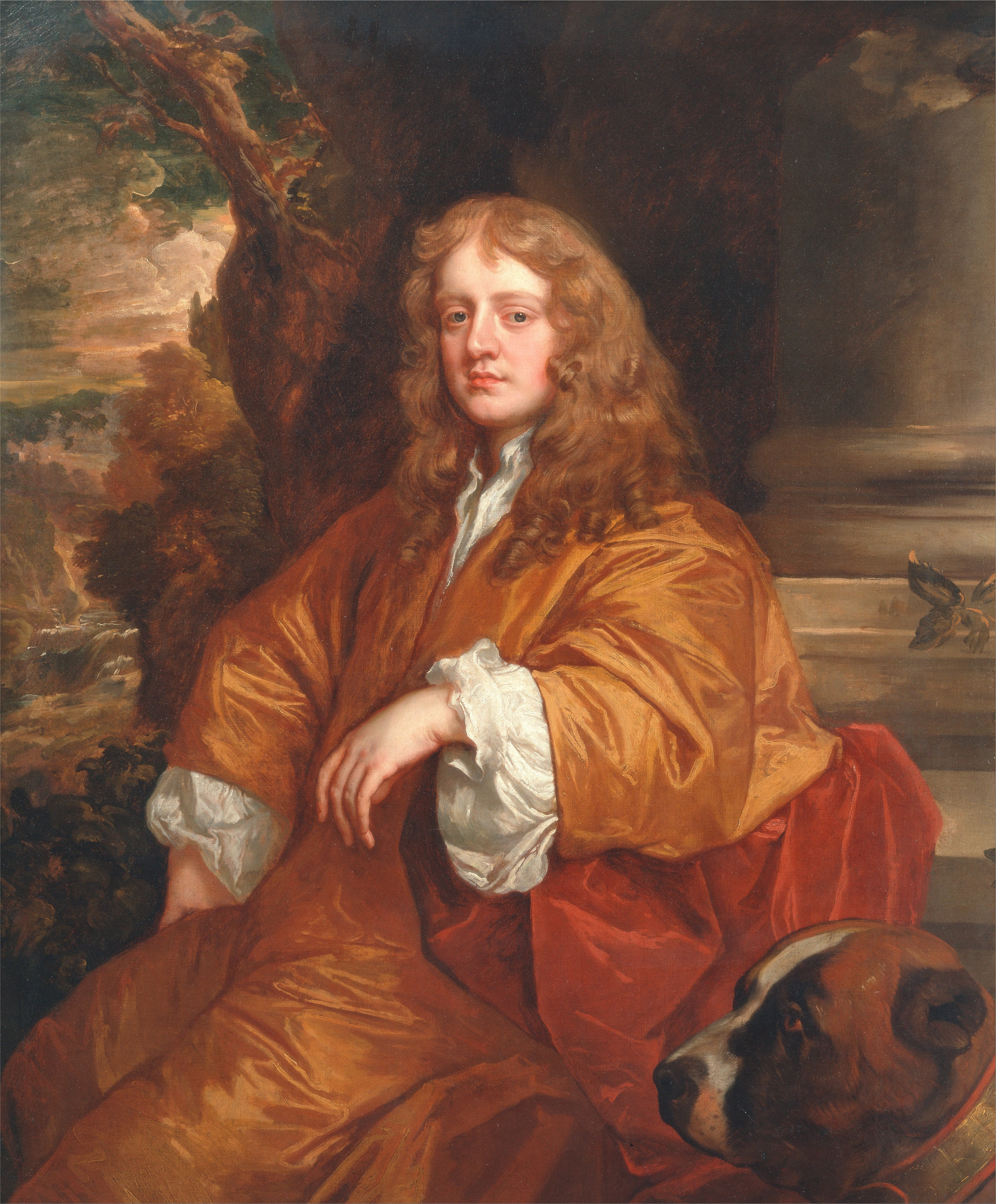
Sir Ralph Bankes, portrait by Sir Peter Lely

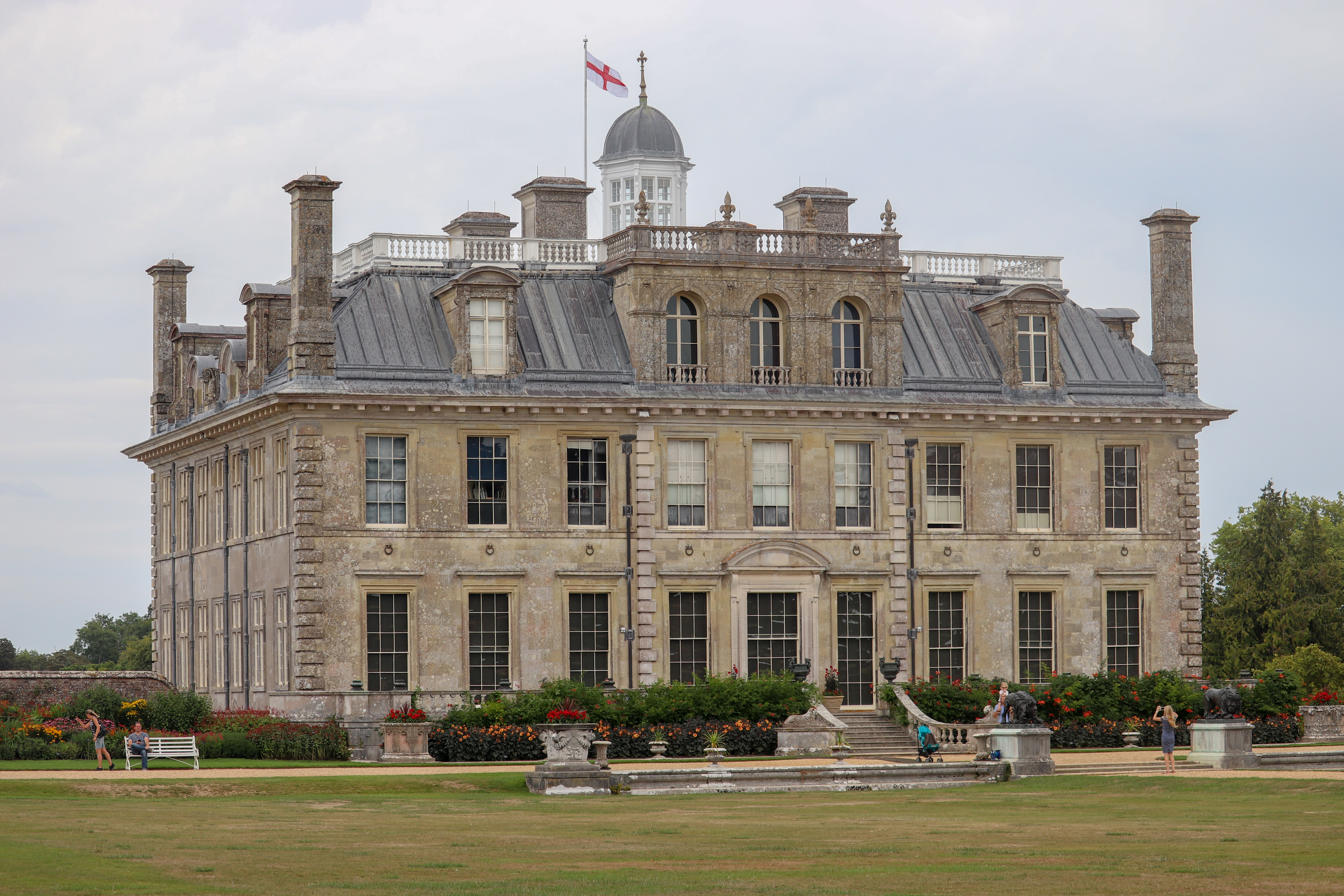
Kingston Lacy House, Dorset

Sir Ralph Bankes (1631–1677) was a courtier of the restored Charles II and a knighted member of the Privy Chamber. He was the builder of Kingston Lacy, the restored seat of the Bankes family, designed by architect Sir Roger Pratt.

Bankes was born at Corfe Castle, Dorset, the second son and one of nine children of Sir John Bankes and Mary Hawtrey. Sir Ralph, like his father, trained in the law at Gray's Inn and became close friends with Peter Lely, the painter, and Roger Pratt, the gentleman architect. In 1661 he married Mary Brune, niece of Charles Brune of Athelhampton, by whom he had two children, John and Mary.

Bankes sat in Richard Cromwell's parliament in 1659 for the family seat of Corfe Castle and remained an MP until his death in 1677, actively safeguarding Dorset interests. With the restoration of Charles II in 1660, he went to Canterbury and was knighted. He was also made a gentleman of the Privy Chamber for services rendered to the crown. He was a reasonably active Parliamentarian, and a supporter of the Crown party.

Until his death, he was engaged with Roger Pratt in the design of Kingston Lacy, a new house to replace the destroyed Corfe Castle, which his mother had defended heroically during the English Civil War. It was based on Clarendon House, built for the Lord Chancellor, which Bankes visited several times. The project led to severe financial difficulties, and at the time of his death, he was endeavouring to raise further funds.

== Sources ==
- Mitchell, Anthony, nd: Kingston Lacy Guide by the National Trust, ISBN 1-84359-042-5
