= Sir Robert Napier, 1st Baronet, of Punknoll =

English lawyer and politician

Sir Robert Napier Bt
- Born: 1642
- Died: 31 October 1700 (aged 57–58)
- Occupations: politician lawyer
- Known for: 1st Baronet of Punknoll

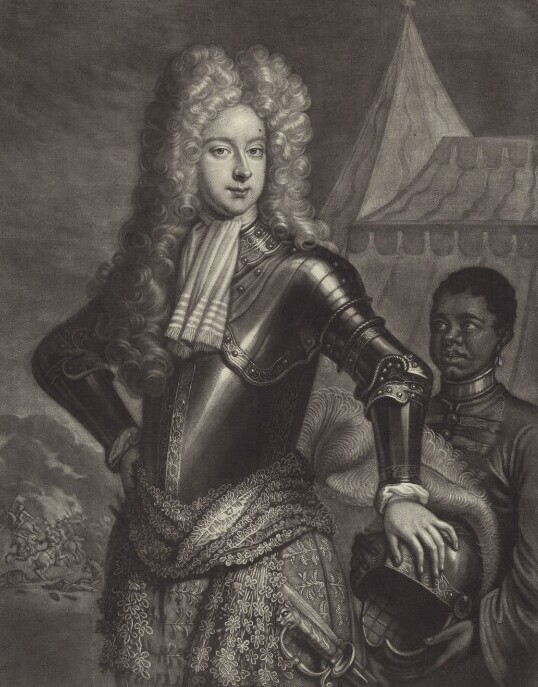
Detail of an engraving of Napier's son Charles and a Black attendant

Sir Robert Napier, 1st Baronet of Punknoll (1642 – 31 October 1700) was an English lawyer and politician. He was the son of Robert Napier of Punknoll (d. 1686), the grandson of Sir Nathaniel Napier, also an MP, and the great-grandson of Sir Robert Napier, a judge who had been Chief Baron of the Exchequer in Ireland. His uncle was Gerrard Napier, created a baronet (in 1641) of Middle Marsh and Moor Crichel, who was also a Member of Parliament.

== Personal life ==
He married Sophia Evelyn, the daughter of Charles Evelyn of Godstone, and they had a son, Charles who assumed the baronetcy upon his death in 1700.

== Early life and career ==
He was educated at Trinity College, Oxford. In 1681, while he served as High Sheriff of Dorset, he was knighted. He was subsequently raised to the Baronetage of Punknoll on 25 February 1682, after which he served as Member of Parliament (MP) for Weymouth (from 1689 to 1690) and Dorchester (in 1690 and from 1698 to his death in 1700).

Baronetage of England
New creation	Baronet (of Punknoll); 1682–1700	Succeeded by Charles Napier
Parliament of England
Preceded by Sir John Strangways; Francis Mohun; Sir John Morton; Henry Henning	Member of Parliament for Weymouth and Melcombe Regis with Michael Harvey; Sir John Morton; Henry Henning; 1689–1690	Succeeded by Nicholas Gould; Michael Harvey; Sir John Morton; Henry Henning
Preceded by Thomas Trenchard; Thomas Chafin	Member of Parliament for Dorchester with James Gould; 1690	Succeeded by Thomas Trenchard; James Gould
Preceded by Nathaniel Bond; Nathaniel Napier	Member of Parliament for Dorchester with Nathaniel Napier; 1698–1700	Succeeded by Thomas Trenchard; Nathaniel Napier
