= Nathaniel Bond =

English lawyer and Member of Parliament

Nathaniel Bond KS (14 June 1634 – 31 August 1707), of Creech Grange in the Isle of Purbeck, Dorset, was an English lawyer and Member of Parliament.

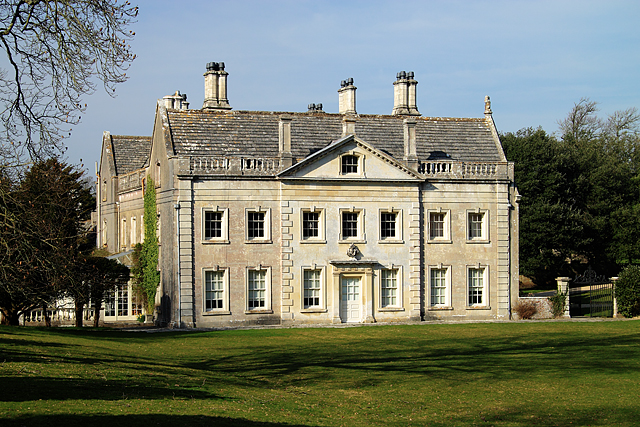
Creech Grange, Dorset

Bond was the fourth son of Denis Bond, a prominent politician during the Interregnum, succeeding to the family estates at Lutton after all his elder brothers died without male heirs, and also in 1686 buying the neighbouring estate of Grange which subsequently became the family seat.

He was educated at Oxford University, awarded a fellowship at All Souls College, matriculated from Wadham College in 1650, graduating B.C.L. in 1654, and incorporated LL.B. at Cambridge University in 1659. He proceeded to the Inner Temple, where he was called to the bar in 1661. Making his career in the law, he was a barrister and King's Serjeant. He entered Parliament in 1679 as member for Corfe Castle, and subsequently also represented Dorchester in 1681.

== Family ==
On 21 December 1667 he married Elizabeth Churchill (b. 1648/9 d. 1674). His second marriage, on 3 August 1675, was to Mary Browne (d. 1728), widow of Thomas Browne of Frampton and daughter of Lewis Williams of Shitterton, and they had two sons:

- Denis Bond of Creech Grange (1676–1747), MP for Dorchester, Corfe Castle and Poole, his heir
- John Bond of Tyneham (1678–1744), MP for Corfe Castle

He bought Creech Grange near Wareham in 1691.

His great-grandson Nathaniel Bond was also an MP for Corfe Castle.

Parliament of England
Preceded by Sir Nathaniel Napier; John Tregonwell	Member of Parliament for Corfe Castle; 1679–1681; With: Sir Nathaniel Napier	Succeeded by Sir Nathaniel Napier; Richard Fownes
Preceded by Sir Robert Napier; James Gould	Member of Parliament for Dorchester; 1681–1685; With: James Gould	Succeeded by Edward Meller; William Churchill
Preceded by Thomas Trenchard; James Gould	Member of Parliament for Dorchester; 1695–1698; With: Nathaniel Napier	Succeeded by Nathaniel Napier; Sir Robert Napier
