= John Browne (1696–1750) =

English lawyer and Tory politician

John Browne (1696–1750) of Forston, Charminster, Dorset, and Lincoln's Inn, London, was an English lawyer and Tory politician who sat in the House of Commons from 1727 to 1750.

Browne was baptized on 24 December 1696, the second son of Robert Browne of Frampton and Forston, and his wife Frances Browne, daughter of Robert Browne of Blandford St Mary, Dorset. He was younger brother of Robert Browne. He matriculated at Hart Hall, Oxford on 1 June 1715, aged 18, and was admitted at Inner Temple in 1715. He was called to the bar in 1722 and was admitted at Lincolns Inn in 1733. He was standing counsel to the East India Company, and became King's Counsel in February 1736.

At the 1727 British general election, Browne was returned unopposed as Tory Member of Parliament (MP) for Dorchester on his family's interest. He voted against the Administration in all recorded divisions. He was returned in a contest at the 1734 British general election. He spoke in favour of the seamen's bill in January 1741 and was one of the Tories who withdrew on the motion for the removal of Walpole in February 1741. He was returned unopposed at the 1741 British general election. He followed Pitt and Lyttleton in walking out of the House on 29 February 1744 during Lord Barrington's speech to defer the suspension of the Habeas Corpus Act against the threatened French invasion. He became Recorder of Dorchester in 1747 and at the 1747 British general election was returned unopposed again for Dorchester.

Browne died unmarried on 25 April 1750.

Parliament of Great Britain
Preceded by Sir William Chapple; Joseph Damer	Member of Parliament for Dorchester; 1727–1750; With: Sir William Chapple 1727-1737; Robert Browne 1727-1741; Nathaniel Gundry 1741-1750	Succeeded by George Damer; John Pitt
