= James Gould =

James Gould may refer to:

- James Gould (jurist) (1770–1838), jurist and professor at the Litchfield Law School
- James L. Gould (born 1945), American ethologist, evolutionary biologist, and popular science writer
- James Gould (rower) (1914–1997), New Zealand rower
- James Nutcombe Gould (1849–1899), English stage actor
- James Gould (died 1676) (1593–1676), Member of Parliament for Dorchester
- James Gould (died 1707) (1620s–1707), Member of Parliament for Dorchester, son of above
- James Childs Gould (1882–1944), Member of Parliament for Cardiff Central
- James J. Gould, member of the Michigan House of Representatives
