= Sir Nathaniel Napier, 3rd Baronet =

English landowner and politician

Sir Nathaniel Napier, 3rd Baronet (c. 1668 – 24 February 1728), of Moor Crichel, Dorset, was an English landowner and politician who sat in the English House of Commons from 1695 to 1708 and in the British House of Commons from 1710 to 1722.

== Early life ==
Napier was the only surviving son of Sir Nathaniel Napier, 2nd Baronet, MP and his wife Blanche Wyndham, the daughter and coheiress of judge Sir Hugh Wyndham of Silton, Dorset. He was admitted at Lincoln's Inn in 1683 and matriculated at Trinity College, Oxford 10 April 1685, aged 16.

In 1709, he succeeded his father to the baronetcy and Crichel House. He married Jane Worsley, the daughter of Sir Robert Worsley, 3rd Baronet, MP, of Appuldurcombe, Isle of Wight in July 1691 but she died in 1692. He married secondly on 28 August 1694, Catherine Alington, the daughter of William Alington, 3rd Baron Alington, MP.

== Career ==
Napier was returned unopposed at the 1695 general election as Member of Parliament (MP) for Dorchester on the family interest. He was returned unopposed in 1698 and topped the poll in a contest at the first 1701 general election. He was returned unopposed at the second election in 1701 and was joined in Parliament by his father at a subsequent by-election. He and his father were returned unopposed together in 1702. He was elected in a contest at the 1705 general election, but did not stand in 1708. He was re-elected as a Tory in contests in 1710 and 1713. He was returned unopposed at the 1715 general election but retired in 1722.

== Death and legacy ==
Napier died at More Critchell on 24 February 1728. He and his second wife Catherine had three sons and three daughters:

- William
- Gerard
- Wyndham
- Diana
- Catherine
- Blanch.

He was succeeded in the baronetcy successively by his sons William and Gerard. The baronetcy became extinct on the death of Gerard's son. The estates then went to Humphrey Sturt, son of Diana and her husband Humphrey Sturt.

Parliament of England
Preceded by James Gould; Thomas Trenchard	Member of Parliament for Dorchester; 1695–1708; With: Nathaniel Bond; Sir Robert Napier, Bt; Thomas Trenchard; Sir Nathaniel Napier, Bt; Awnsham Churchill	Succeeded by Awnsham Churchill; John Churchill
Parliament of Great Britain
Preceded by Awnsham Churchill; Denis Bond	Member of Parliament for Dorchester; 1710–1722; With: Benjamin Gifford; Henry Trenchard; Robert Browne; Abraham Janssen	Succeeded by Edmund Morton Pleydell; Joseph Damer
Baronetage of England
Preceded by Nathaniel Napier	Baronet (of Middle Marsh); 1709–1728	Succeeded by William Napier
