= Matthew Chubbe =

English politician

Member of the England Parliament for Dorchester
- In office 1601–1611
- Preceded by: Richard Wright
- Succeeded by: George Horsey

Personal details
- Died: 1617

Matthew Chubbe (died 1617), of Dorchester, Dorset, was an English politician.

He was a Member (MP) of the Parliament of England for Dorchester in 1601 and 1604.
