= Nathaniel Napier =

Nathaniel Napier may refer to:

- Nathaniel Napier (died 1635), MP
- Sir Nathaniel Napier, 2nd Baronet, MP for Dorchester and Corfe Castle
- Sir Nathaniel Napier, 3rd Baronet, MP for Dorchester
