= Nihil =

Nihil may refer to:

- Nihil, concept of Nothingness

== Law ==
- Nihil obstat
- Nihil novi

== Books ==
- "Nihil", poem by Jean Passerat in 1588
- Nihil, an invisible planet whose inhabitants invade the Earth in the 1964 science fiction novel, Beyond the Spectrum
- Annihilus, an alien character in the Marvel Comics

== Music ==
- Nihil (Impaled Nazarene album) 2007
- Nihil (KMFDM album), a 1995 album by German industrial band KMFDM
- "Nihil", a song by Godflesh from the 1991 EP Cold World
- "Nihil", a song by The Amenta from the 2004 album Occasus
- "Nihil", a song by Ghostemane from the 2018 album N/O/I/S/E/

== See also ==
- Nihilism
- Nihilist (disambiguation)
