= Awnsham Churchill =

English bookseller and radical Whig politician

Awnsham Churchill (1658–1728), of the Black Swan, Paternoster Row, London and Henbury, Dorset, was an English bookseller and radical Whig politician who sat in the English and British House of Commons from 1705 to 1710.

== Early life ==
Churchill was the son of William Churchill of Dorchester, Dorset, and his wife Elizabeth Awnsham, daughter of Nicholas Awnsham of Isleworth, Middlesex. He was the brother of the MPs Joshua Churchill and William Churchill. He was apprenticed to George Sawbridge and became a Freeman of the Stationers' Company in 1681. With another brother, John, he then entered into business as booksellers and stationers at the sign of the Black Swan in Paternoster Row, London. At the beginning of 1680 he signed a petition to the king asking for the recall of parliament; and in 1682 he published a sermon of Samuel Bold against persecution.

== Stationer ==
In the mid-1680s the Churchill brothers were involved in the opposition to James II of England, visiting Amsterdam and consorting with those supporting Monmouth's Rebellion. He was arrested in 1687 for printing Gaspar Fagel's Letter, which outlined the position on religious toleration of the Prince of Orange.

Churchill was later stationer to William III of England, as the Prince became in 1689, and a leading bookseller of his time. He amassed a fortune, and was able to purchase, in 1704, the manor of Higher Henbury in Dorset from John Morton, and that of West Ringstead from James Huishe in 1723.

== Political career ==
Churchill was returned in a contest as Whig Member of Parliament for Dorchester at the 1705 English general election. He voted for the Court candidate for Speaker on 25 October 1705. He was distantly related to the other Dorchester member John Churchill and also was related to the Duke of Marlborough, but had little to do with him. He was closer to George Churchill, the Duke's brother. He was returned again unopposed as a Whig at the 1708 British general election. He kept a low profile in Parliament but voted in favour of naturalizing the Palatines in 1709 and for the impeachment of Sacheverell in 1710. This was enough to alienate the High Churchmen of Dorchester, and in 1710 they procured an address from the borough which pointedly condemned ‘republican principles and anti-monarchical notions’. They said they would take care to be represented in future Parliaments by eminently loyal and perspicuously zealous representatives. Churchill was defeated at the poll at the 1710 British general election, and again in 1713. He made no further attempts to enter Parliament

== Relationship with John Locke ==
John Locke met Churchill in Rotterdam. They remained on friendly terms for many years. Churchill was Locke's publisher, and Edward Clarke acted as an intermediary at some point. The Two Treatises of Government and A Letter Concerning Toleration of 1689 were published by Churchill, with other works by Locke.

Churchill also managed money and business for Locke. As Locke was dying in 1704 they parted at High Laver, and Churchill was a trustee for money Locke was leaving to Francis Cudworth Masham, son of Damaris Cudworth Masham.

== Death and legacy ==
Churchill died unmarried on 24 April 1728, and his brother John succeeded to his estate. A library at Henbury was formed by the two brothers.

== Publications ==
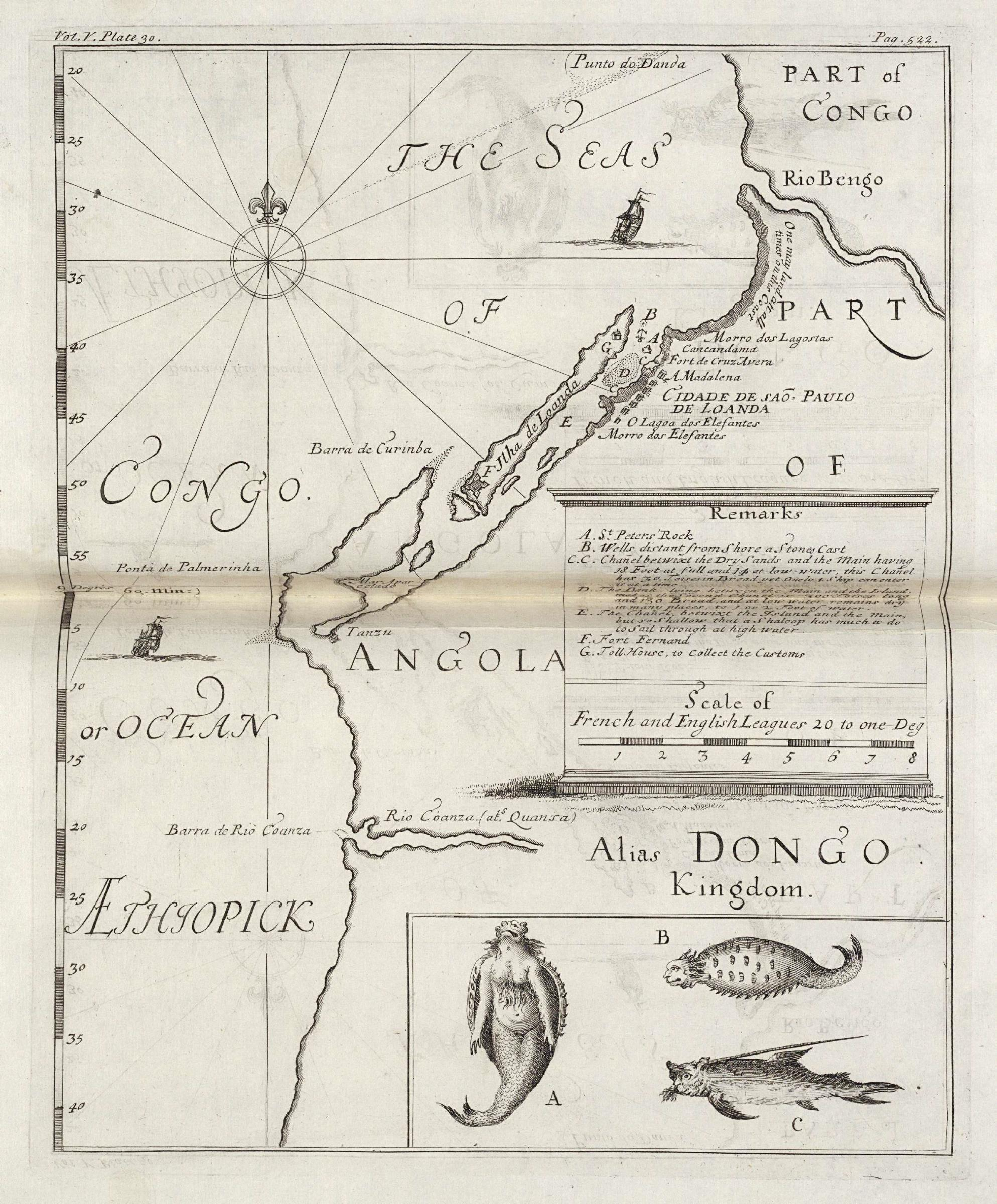
Map of 1732 of the coast of Angola, from the Collection of Voyages and Travels by Awnsham and John Churchill

The Churchill brothers published in 1695 the edition of William Camden's Britannia by Edmund Gibson, from a manuscript of John Aubrey. A second edition of Gibson's Camden was issued by Awnsham alone in 1722. Their Collection of Voyages and Travels was well known, and was issued to subscribers in 1704. Two more volumes came out in 1732, when the first four volumes were reissued; a "third edition" of the six volumes is dated 1744–6; and another by Thomas Osborne, 1752. A Collection from the Library of the Earl of Oxford, London, T. Osborne, 1745 and 1747, 2 vols, known as the "Harleian Collection", and a similar collection by John Harris (1744–8 as 2 vols.), are often grouped with Churchill's collection, as reprints of voyages and travels. Locke was involved, and it was stated on the title-page of the third edition that the preliminary essay on the history of navigation was attributed to him, which was later questioned; but it was included in Locke's works in 1812.

The brothers also published the first edition of Thomas Rymer's Fœdera (16 vols. 1701–15); the seventeenth volume (1717) was issued by William Churchill, and the last three (1726–1735) by Jacob Tonson.

== Notes ==
Parliament of Great Britain
| Preceded by Sir Nathaniel Napier, 2nd Baronet; Nathaniel Napier | Member of Parliament for Dorchester; 1705–1710; With: Nathaniel Napier 1705-1708; John Churchill 1708-1709; Denis Bond 1709-1710 | Succeeded by Nathaniel Napier; Benjamin Gifford |

Attribution

This article incorporates text from a publication now in the public domain: Stephen, Leslie, ed. (1887). "Churchill, Awnsham". Dictionary of National Biography. Vol. 10. London: Smith, Elder & Co.
