= Hole (surname) =

Hole is a surname. Notable individuals with the surname include:

== People ==
- Barrie Hole (1942–2019), Welsh international footballer and son of Billy Hole
- Billy Hole (1897–1983), Welsh international footballer and father of Barrie Hole
- Brandon Scott Hole (2001–2021), American spree killer and perpetrator of the 2021 Indianapolis FedEx shooting
- Christopher Hole (1511–1570), English politician.
- Dave Hole (born 1948), Australian slide guitarist
- Frank Hole (born 1931), American archaeologist
- Fred Hole (1935–2011), English art director
- Graeme Hole (1931–1990), Australian cricketer
- Harry Hole (1855–1942), New Zealand cricketer
- Hugh Marshall Hole (1865–1941), English pioneer, administrator and author
- Joanna Hole (born 1955), British actress
- Jonathan Hole (1904–1998), American actor
- Jean Hole (born 1925 - 2011) British palaeontologist known for discovering the Dune shearwater
- Kevin Hole, Australian rugby league footballer who played in the 1950s and 1960s
- Lois Hole (c.1929 – 2005), Canadian politician and author
- Martin Hole (born 1959), Norwegian cross-country skier
- Max Hole (born 1951), chairman and CEO of UMGI
- Michael Hole (1941–1976), British-born horse racing jockey who mainly raced in USA
- Mickey Hole (1892–1969), NFL player
- Nina Hole (1941–2016), Danish artist
- Njål Hole MBE (1914–1988), Norwegian chemical engineer and nuclear physicist
- Robert Selby Hole (1875–1938), British botanist whose standard author abbreviation is Hole
- Samuel Hole (1819–1904), English Anglican priest, author and horticulturalist
- Sigurd Hole (born 1981), Norwegian jazz musician
- Stian Hole (born 1969), Norwegian graphic designer, illustrator and writer of children's books
- Stuart Hole (born 1985), former English cricketer
- Tahu Hole CBE (1908–1985), New Zealand born journalist
- William Brassey Hole (1846–1917), English artist
- Willits J. Hole (1858–1936), American businessman and real estate developer in Southern California

== Fictional characters ==
- Harry Hole, fictional Norwegian detective

== See also ==
- Einar Hole Moxnes (1921–2006), Norwegian politician for the Centre Party
