= George Chafin =

British landowner and Tory politician

George Chafin or Chaffin (c. 1689 – 7 September 1766), of Chettle House, Dorset, England, was a British landowner and Tory politician who sat in the House of Commons from 1713 to 1754.

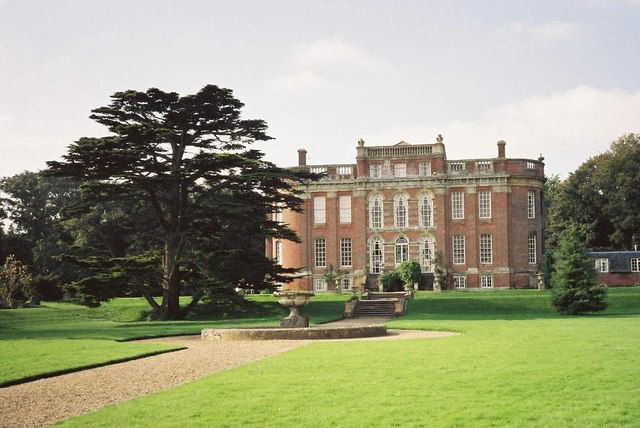
Chettle House in 2001

Chafin was baptized on 7 January 1689, the fifth son of Thomas Chafin MP of Chettle and his wife Anne Penruddock, daughter of Colonel John Penruddock of Compton Chamberlayne, Wiltshire. His father commanded a troop of horse against the Duke of Monmouth at the Battle of Sedgemoor in 1685 and died in 1691. Chafin was probably educated at Winchester College from about 1702 to 1706; and matriculated at Oriel College, Oxford on 12 July 1707, aged 18. He succeeded to the family estates in Dorset, Hampshire, Surrey and Somerset on the death of his elder brother Thomas in 1711. Chafin rebuilt Chettle House to the design of the architect Thomas Archer. He married Elizabeth Sturt, daughter of Sir Anthony Sturt, by licence dated 8 February 1714.

Chafin was returned unopposed as Tory Member of Parliament for Dorset at the 1713 general election. There are no known speeches or votes by him in that Parliament. He was returned unopposed in 1715 and 1722, but there was a contest in 1727 at which he was successful. At the 1734 general election, he was returned unopposed again at Dorset. He withdrew on the motion for removing Walpole in February 1741. He was returned unopposed again at the 1741 and 1747 general elections. He voted consistently against the Administration from 1715 onwards. By 1748 he was in financial difficulties, and had to obtain an Act of Parliament to allow him to sell some of his settled estates to pay his debts. At a meeting at Dorchester in August 1753, he declined nomination for the next election, being according to an electoral survey "ruined in his affairs", and did not stand in 1754.

Chafin's financial difficulties continued and in 1757 he had to obtain another Act of Parliament to allow him to sell off more of the estates. He died on 7 September 1766. He had five sons and three daughters.

Parliament of Great Britain
Preceded by Thomas Strangways I Richard Bingham	Member of Parliament for Dorset; 1713–1754; With: Thomas Strangways II 1713-1727; George Pitt 1727; Edmund Morton Pleydell 1727-1747; George Pitt 1747-1754	Succeeded by Humphrey Sturt; George Pitt
