= John Churchill (died 1682) =

English politician

John Churchill (1622 - 1682) was an English politician who sat in the House of Commons from 1661 to 1679.

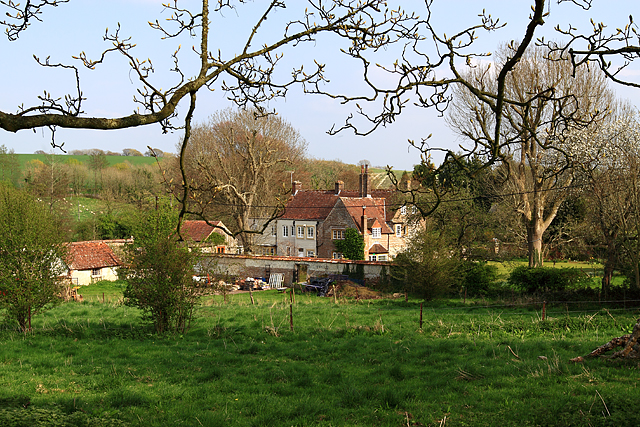
Muston Manor, Dorset

Churchill was the son of William Churchill of Muston Manor, Piddlehinton and his wife Mary Yarde, daughter of George Yarde of Churston Ferrers, Devon. He was a student of Middle Temple in 1647. He was J.P. for Dorset from July 1660. In 1661, he was elected Member of Parliament for Dorchester in the Cavalier Parliament. He was commissioner for assessment from 1661 to 1680. In 1662 he became a freeman of Poole and Lyme Regis. He was commissioner for corporations for Dorset from 1662 to 1663. In 1675 he was commissioner for recusants. He succeeded his father to the family estate in 1681.

Churchill died at the age of about 60 and was buried at Piddlehinton on 22 December 1682.

Churchill married firstly Bridget Vaughan, daughter of Charles Vaughan of Ottery St. Mary, Devon on 30 January 1650 and had one daughter. He married secondly in July 1664, Frances Hooke, daughter of John Hooke of Bramshot, Hampshire. His property passed to his brother.

Parliament of England
Preceded by Denzil Holles; James Gould	Member of Parliament for Dorchester; 1661–1679; With: James Gould 1661–1677; James Gould	Succeeded by Sir Francis Holles; Nicholas Gould
