= Lamers =

Lamers (Dutch pronunciation: [ˈlaːmərs]) is a Dutch / Low Franconian patronymic surname, from the now rare given name Lamert, a local form of Lambert. Among variant spellings are Laamers and Laemers. Notable people with the surname include:

- Gijsbert Hendrik Lamers (1834–1903), Dutch theologian
- Ine Lamers (born 1954), Dutch photographer and video installation artist
- Karl Lamers (1935–2022), German politician
- Karl A. Lamers (born 1951), German CDU politician, NATO Parliamentary Assembly president 2010–12
- Karl F. Lamers (1935–2022), German CDU politician
- Kiki Lamers (born 1964), Dutch painter and photographer
- Loiza Lamers (born 1995), Dutch model
- Martin Laamers (1967–2025), Dutch football midfielder
- Rolf Lamers (1927–2016), German middle-distance runner

== See also ==
- Lamer (surname)
- Lamer, internet pejorative
- Lammers, surname of a similar origin
