= Bill Newton (disambiguation) =

Bill Newton (1919–1943) was an Australian recipient of the Victoria Cross.

Bill Newton may also refer to:

- Bill Newton (politician) (1934–2015), Australian politician
- Bill Newton (basketball) (born 1950), American basketball player
- Bill Newton (footballer) (1875–1941), Australian rules footballer

== See also ==
- William Newton (disambiguation)
