= Gerard Napier =

Gerard Napier may refer to:

- Sir Gerrard Napier, 1st Baronet (1606–1673), MP for Wareham, and for Weymouth and Melcombe Regis
- Gerard Napier (MP for Dorchester) (c. 1661–1689)
- Sir Gerard Napier, 6th Baronet (1739–1765), MP for Bridport
