= Denis Bond (MP) =

English lawyer and Whig politician

Denis Bond (1676–1747), of Creech Grange, Dorset, was an English lawyer and Whig politician who sat in the British House of Commons between 1709 and 1732, when he was expelled for financial misconduct.

== Early life ==
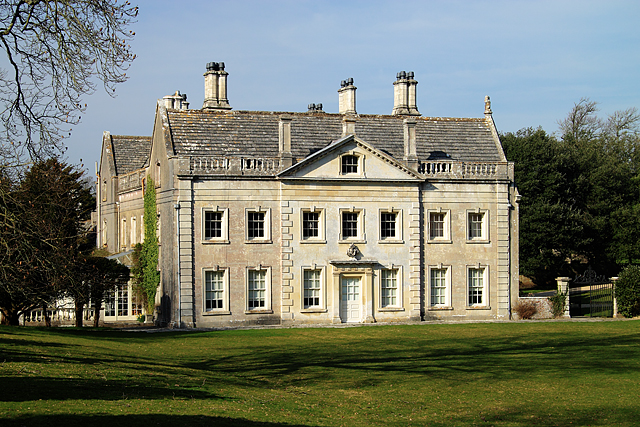
Creech Grange, Dorset

Bond was the elder son and heir of the wealthy barrister Nathaniel Bond, who came from a family who had been merchants in Dorchester, and bought Creech Grange, near Wareham in 1691. He was admitted at Inner Temple in 1695 and called to the bar in 1703. He succeeded his father to Creech Grange in 1707.

== Career ==
Bond became Recorder of Dorchester and of Weymouth and Melcombe Regis in 1707 and held the position for the rest of his life. He first stood for Parliament at Wareham at the 1708 general election but was defeated. He was returned as Member of Parliament for Dorchester at a by-election on 5 December 1709, but was defeated at the 1710 general election. He did not stand in 1713 but was appointed carrier of the King's letters in 1714 and held the post for the rest of his life.

At the 1715 general election Bond was elected MP for Corfe Castle and was appointed Commissioner for forfeited estates in 1716. In 1719 he became Recorder of Poole. He was returned unopposed as MP for Corfe Castle in 1722. He became Recorder of Wareham in 1724. In 1725 he ceased to be on the commission for forfeited estates, but became a member of the committee of management of the Charitable Corporation. At the 1727 general election he changed seats and was returned unopposed as MP for Poole. He became bencher of his Inn in 1728.

== Financial scandals ==
In 1731 Bond was exposed as being involved in financial scandals. While on the Commission for forfeited lands, he had colluded with John Birch in the fraudulent sale of lands forfeited by the 3rd Earl of Derwentwater. They also acquired an annuity for the life of the real heir of the estate who was under age and expected to survive a full lifetime. When this heir died aged 18 the whole swindle came to light. A parliamentary inquiry was instituted by Lord Gage and as a result the sales were annulled. Bond and Birch were expelled from the House of Commons. At this time Bond was a director of the Charitable Corporation, which was set up to make small loans to the poor. Instead the corporation was lending the money to the City of London and receiving high returns instead. The House of Commons declared Bond and his colleagues to have been 'guilty of many notorious breaches of trust and many indirect and fraudulent practices'. They were forbidden to leave the country or to sell any of their property so that compensation could be claimed. However, in the next year, on further information, the House of Commons reduced its judgement of Bond's behaviour to neglect of duty and took no further action. Bond did not return to Parliament, but kept all his offices and was dutiful in the church and the law. He became churchwarden of St. George's, Hanover Square, in 1735 and Treasurer of his Inn 1739.

== Death and legacy ==
Bond died on 30 January 1747. He had married Leonara Sophia Dummer, widow of Edmund Dummer and daughter of the diplomat Sir William Dutton Colt in 1729. They had no children and Bond's estates, including Creech Grange, passed to his nephew John Bond.

Parliament of Great Britain
Preceded by Awnsham Churchill; John Churchill	Member of Parliament for Dorchester; 1709–1710; With: Awnsham Churchill	Succeeded by Sir Nathaniel Napier; Benjamin Gifford
Preceded by John Bankes; Richard Fownes	Member of Parliament for Corfe Castle; 1715–1727; With: William Okeden 1715–1718; Joshua Churchill 1718–1721; John Bond 1721–1722; John Bankes 1722–1741	Succeeded by John Bond; John Bankes
Preceded by George Trenchard; Thomas Ridge	Member of Parliament for Poole; 1727–1732; With: George Trenchard	Succeeded by George Trenchard; Thomas Wyndham
