= Robert Browne (1695–1757) =

English politician

Robert Browne (1695 – 21 April 1757), of Frampton, near Dorchester, Dorset, was an English politician who sat in the House of Commons in 1720 and from 1737 to 1741.

Browne was baptized on 7 August 1695, the eldest son of Robert Browne of Frampton and Forston, Charminster, Dorset and his wife Frances Browne, daughter of Robert Browne of Blandford St Mary, Dorset. He matriculated at Hart Hall, Oxford in November 1715, aged 20. He married Jenny Brune, daughter of Charles Brune of Plumber, Lydlinch, Dorset.

Browne was elected by one vote as Tory Member of Parliament (MP) for Dorchester at a by-election on 23 April 1720. However, he was unseated on petition on 18 May 1720. He became High Steward of Dorchester in 1734 and held the position for the rest of his life. He was returned as MP for Dorchester at a by-election on 25 June 1737 and joined his brother John in Parliament. He did not stand again at the 1741 general election.

Browne died without issue on 21 April 1757.

Parliament of Great Britain
Preceded by Sir Nathaniel Napier, Bt; Henry Trenchard	Member of Parliament for Dorchester; 1720; With: Sir Nathaniel Napier, Bt	Succeeded by Sir Nathaniel Napier, Bt; Abraham Janssen
Preceded by Sir William Chapple; John Browne	Member of Parliament for Dorchester; 1737–1741; With: John Browne	Succeeded by Nathaniel Gundry; John Browne
