= Richard Hyde =

Richard or Dick Hyde may refer to:

== Entertainment and sports ==
- Dick Hyde (baseball) (born 1928), American former relief pitcher
- Dick Hyde (musician), American trombone and tuba player
- Richard Hyde (1856–1912), American theatre impresario of the firm Hyde and Benham

== Politicians ==
- Richard Hyde (MP for Worcestershire), Member of Parliament (MP) for Worcestershire
- Richard Hyde (MP for Dorchester) (fl.1406)

== See also ==
- John Richard Hyde (1912–2003), Canadian soldier, provincial politician and judge
