= Gutton =

Gutton is a surname. Notable people with the surname include:

- André Gutton (1904–2002), French architect
- Camille Gutton (1872–1963), French physicist
- Robert Gutton (fl. 1384–1397), English politician and member of the Parliament of England
