= Samuel Bond =

Samuel Bond may refer to:

- Kit Bond (Christopher Samuel Bond, born 1939), former United States Senator from Missouri
- Samuel Bond (MP) (died 1673), English academic, lawyer and politician
