= Henry Trenchard =

Henry Trenchard may refer to:

- Henry Trenchard (MP for Dorchester) (1668–1720)
- Henry Trenchard (MP for Poole) (c.1652–1694)
