= Gerard Napier (MP for Dorchester) =

English politician

Gerard Napier (c. 1661 – 16 November 1689), of East Woodsford, Dorset, was an English politician.

He was the second son of Sir Nathaniel Napier, 2nd Baronet and younger brother of Sir Nathaniel Napier, 3rd Baronet. He was educated at Lincoln's Inn from 1676 and matriculated at Wadham College, Oxford in 1677.

He was a Member (MP) of the Parliament of England for Dorchester in 1689.

On his death in 1689 he was buried at Minterne Magna.
