= Sir Abraham Janssen, 2nd Baronet =

British politician

Sir Abraham Janssen, 2nd baronet (c. 1699 – 1765), of Wimbledon, Surrey, was a British politician who sat in the House of Commons from 1720 to 1722.

Janssen was the eldest son of Sir Theodore Janssen, 1st Baronet, of Wimbledon, and his wife Williamza or Williamsa Henley.

Janssen was returned as member of parliament for Dorchester on 18 May 1720 on petition after being defeated by one vote at a by-election. During his time in the House of Commons his father was expelled for his part in the South Sea Bubble scandal. He made little impression and did not stand at the 1722 general election.

From 1725 to 1728, Janssen was a Director of the East India Company. He succeeded his father in the baronetcy on 22 September 1748.

Janssen died unmarried and without issue on 19 February 1765. He was succeeded in the baronetcy by his brother Henry.

Parliament of Great Britain
Preceded by Sir Nathaniel Napier, Bt; Robert Browne	Member of Parliament for Dorchester; 1720–1722; With: Sir Nathaniel Napier, Bt	Succeeded by Edmund Morton Pleydell; Joseph Damer
Baronetage of Great Britain
Preceded by Theodore Janssen	Baronet (of Wimbledon); 1748–1765	Succeeded by Henry Jannsen
