= Richard Burke Jr. =

British barrister and Member of Parliament (1758-1794)

Richard Burke
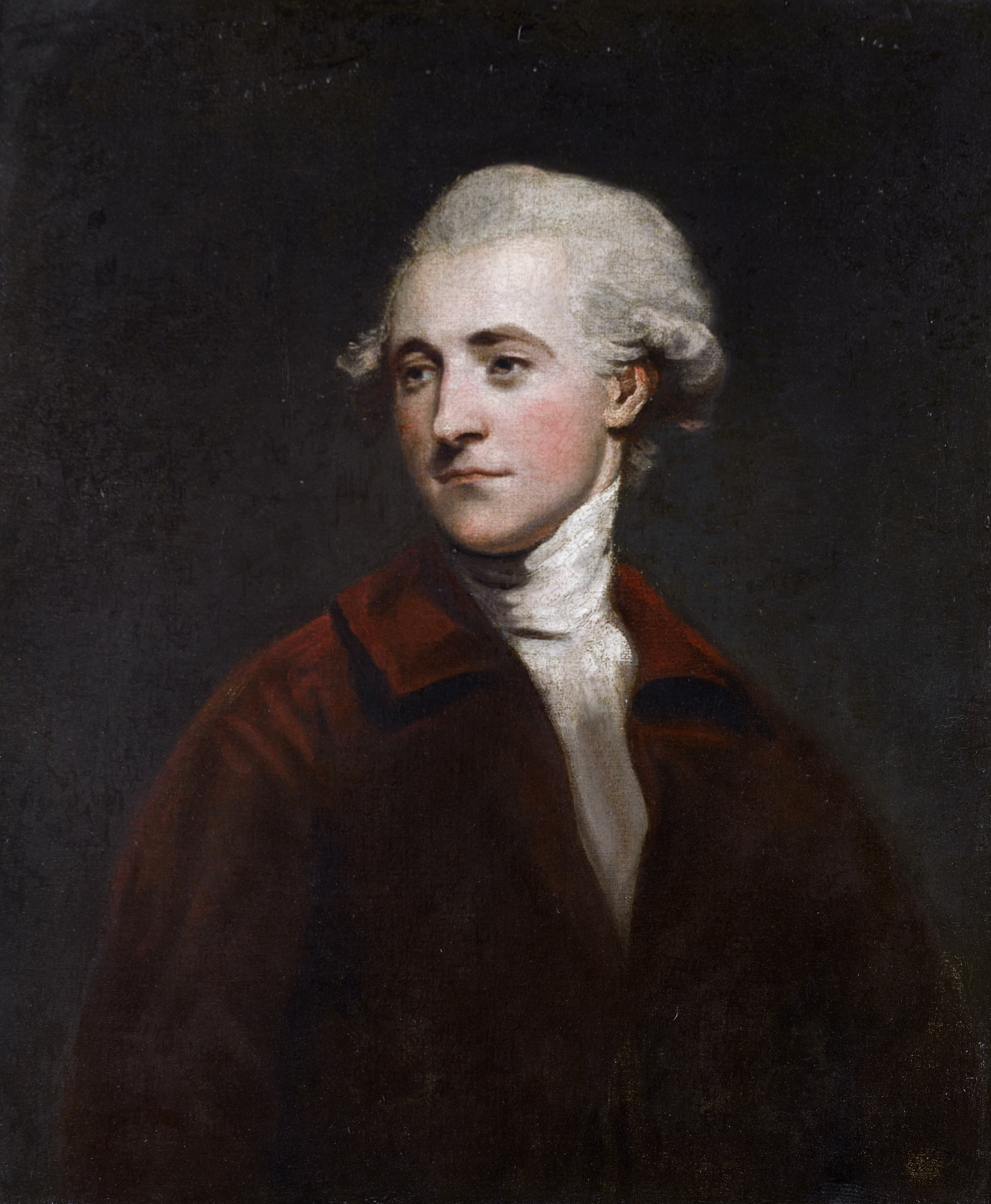
- Richard Burke (studio of Sir Joshua Reynolds)

Member of Parliament for Malton
- In office 1794–1794
- Preceded by: Edmund Burke
- Succeeded by: William Baldwin

Personal details
- Born: 9 February 1758 Battersea, London, England
- Died: 2 August 1794 (aged 36) South Kensington, London, England
- Party: Whig
- Parent: Edmund Burke (father)
- Education: Christ Church, Oxford
- Occupation: Agent of the Catholic Committee
- Profession: Barrister

Richard Burke (9 February 1758 – 2 August 1794; not be confused with his uncle, also named Richard Burke) was a British barrister and Member of Parliament.

He was born in Battersea, the son of Edmund Burke and Jane Mary Nugent. He was educated at Westminster School and Christ Church, Oxford, and was called to the bar at the Middle Temple in 1780. His father had high hopes for "the Whelp", never to be realized.

He was Recorder of Bristol from 1783 until his early death.

In 1791 Richard carried out a mission to the Koblenz headquarters of the French émigré army on behalf of his father, who was indulging in private diplomacy. Thereafter he returned to Ireland to become an agent of the Catholic Committee, which achieved a small measure of Catholic Emancipation in the Irish Parliament's Roman Catholic Relief Act 1793.

In 1794 his father resigned his seat in parliament for Malton, North Yorkshire over the failure to convict Warren Hastings in a parliamentary impeachment. Richard was elected in succession to his father, but fell ill soon afterwards, and died in South Kensington at the early age of thirty-six on 2 August 1794, and was buried in Beaconsfield.

The elder Burke suffered grief on a scale described by eyewitnesses as "truly terrific". In the words of his biographer, Edmund's bursts of affliction were of fearful force, so overwhelming indeed as to fright and almost to paralyze those who were around them. The Dictionary of National Biography article describes the grief of the parents as "almost uncontrollable", and his father considered himself ‘marked by the hand of God’

Richard had been a member of The Club since 1782. His contacts with Samuel Johnson were fairly slight, and on one occasion involved a rebuke to the younger man for futile attempts at "smart drollery".

No evidence has been found to support the claim that he was married, though a potential marriage to Mary Palmer, niece of Joshua Reynolds was speculated in 1792.

In August 1791, Richard was sent by his father to Koblenz with the mission of helping unite royalists on the continent against the revolutionary regime in Paris. He found it beyond his skill to reconcile the warring factions among French royalists, and was snubbed by government ministers on his return.

He was again an instrument of his father's policy in Ireland: to secure the loyalty of the comparatively small class of propertied Catholics by securing the vote for them on the same very limited and idiosyncratic terms on which it was available to Protestants. This was achieved with the Roman Catholic Relief Act 1793, though by then (in early 1792) the younger Burke had been replaced as secretary of the Catholic Committee in Dublin by the United Irishman, Theobald Wolfe Tone, in a move that signalled a radicalisation of Catholic opinion.

On his father’s retirement in 1794, Burke accepted an offer from Lord William Fitzwilliam, appointed Lord Lieutenant of Ireland, of his English parliamentary seat at Malton. However, after receiving what his father called "a glimmering of public hope", a week after his election Richard Burke died of tuberculosis on 2 August 1794. Edmund Burke "reproached himself for having made such unsparing use of his son’s services".

== Resources ==
- Encyclopedia of Richard Burke

Parliament of Great Britain
Preceded by Edmund Burke; George Damer	Member of Parliament for Malton; 1794; With: George Damer	Succeeded by George Damer; William Baldwin
