= John Jordan =

John or Johnny Jordan may refer to:

== Sportspeople ==
- John Jordan (basketball, born 1910), American basketball player and coach for the University of Notre Dame
- John Jordan (basketball, born 1992), American basketball player
- John Jordan (cricketer) (1932–2007), English cricketer
- Jack Jordan (footballer) (1924–2007), Scottish footballer
- Johnny Jordan (1921–2016), English footballer
- Johnny Jordan (rugby league) (1906–1957), English rugby league footballer

== Politicians ==
- John Jordan (died c. 1422), member of parliament for Dorchester 1397–1414
- John W. Jordan (born 1926), American politician in Florida
- John T. Jordan (1832–1886), mayor of Seattle
- John Jordan (Canadian politician), MPP in Ontario
- John Paul Jordan, member of the Oklahoma House of Representatives
- John Jordan (West Virginia politician), member of the West Virginia House of Delegates

== Others ==
- John Jordan (diplomat) (1852–1925), British diplomat and Minister Plenipotentiary to China
- John Jordan (judge), Irish judge
- John Jordan (poet) (1930–1988), Irish poet
- John Jordan (vintner), American vintner and Republican donor
- John Q. Jordan, African American journalist
- John Jordan (woodturner) (1950–2023) American artist and woodturner
- John Jordan (1925–69) British aerial cameraman and second unit film director

== See also ==
- Jack Jordan (disambiguation)
