= William Newton =

William or Bill Newton may refer to:

== Entertainment ==
- William Newton (poet) (1750–1830), English poet, the Peak Minstrel from Derbyshire
- William John Newton (1785–1869), English miniature-painter
- Frankie Newton (William Frank Newton, 1906–1954), American jazz trumpeter
- William Newton (novelist), pseudonym of Kenneth Newton (1927–2010), English doctor
- William Arnold Newton (1965–1990), actor and producer of gay erotic films

== Military ==
- Bill Newton (William Ellis Newton, 1919–1943), Australian recipient of the Victoria Cross
- William Newton (British Army officer) (died 1730), brigadier-general

== Politics ==
- William Newton (MP for Dorchester) (died 1453), English MP for Dorchester
- William Newton (MP for Ipswich) (1783–1862), English MP for Ipswich
- William Newton (Mauritian politician) (1842–1915), Mauritian barrister, politician and MP

== Sports ==
- William Newton (footballer) (1900–1965), English soccer player
- William Newton (sport shooter), British Olympic shooter

== Other ==
- William Newton (architect, 1730–1798), English architect
- William Newton (architect, 1735–1790), English architect
- William Newton (priest) (1843–1914), American Episcopalian priest and author
- William Newton (trade unionist) (1822–1876), English trade unionist, journalist, and Chartist

== See also ==
- Bill Newton (disambiguation)
- Willie Newton (born 1978), Australian rugby league player
- William Newton Byers (1831–1903), American founding figure of Omaha, Nebraska
- William Newton-Smith (born 1943), Anglo-Canadian philosopher of science
- Billy Newton-Davis (born 1951), Canadian singer-songwriter
- Bill Newton Dunn (born 1941), British politician in the European Parliament
- Williams Newton (1893–1970), American football and baseball coach
