= Thomas Martin =

Thomas, Tom, or Tommy Martin may refer to:

== Arts and entertainment ==
- Thomas Mower Martin (1838–1934), English-born Canadian landscape painter
- Thomas Martin (musician) (born 1940), American-born double bass player and luthier
- Thomas K. Martin (born 1960), American fantasy author
- Tom Martin (writer) (born 1964), American television writer
- One of twins James and Tom Martin (born 1977), British musicians
- T. J. Martin (born 1979), American filmmaker

== Business and industry ==
- Thomas Martin (banker) (c. 1679–1765), British banker and Whig politician
- Thomas J. Martin (1842–1872), American inventor awarded a patent for improvements to the fire extinguisher
- Thomas Acquin Martin (1850–1906), English industrialist in India
- Thomas Reed Martin (1866–1949), American architect in Florida

== Law and politics ==
=== United Kingdom ===
- Thomas Martin (politician, died 1583) (1530–1583), English politician, MP for Dorchester
- Thomas Martin (lawyer) (1521–1593), English politician, MP for Ludgershall, Saltash and Hindon
- Thomas Byam Martin (1773–1854), British Admiral and MP for Plymouth
- Thomas Barnwall Martin (1784–1847), Irish landowner and Member of the British Parliament for County Galway
- Thomas Martin (Conservative politician) (1901–1995), British MP for Blaydon

=== United States ===
- Thomas Bryan Martin (1731–1798), American jurist and legislator
- Thomas S. Martin (1847–1919), United States Representative and Senator from Virginia
- Thomas E. Martin (1893–1971), United States Representative and Senator from Iowa
- Tom Martin (Texas politician) (1948–2018), American politician, mayor of Lubbock, Texas
- Thomas Martin (Maine politician), American politician and businessperson

=== Elsewhere ===
- Thomas Martin (Canadian politician) (1850–1907), Canadian Member of Parliament

== Science and medicine ==
- Thomas Commerford Martin (1856–1924), American electrical engineer and editor
- Thomas "Doc" Martin (1864–1935), American physician in Taos County, New Mexico
- Thomas L. Martin (1885–1958), English American soil agronomist
- Thomas Martin (pathologist) (born 1937), Australian pathologist

== Sports ==
- Tom Martin (Australian footballer) (1888–1949), Australian rules footballer
- Thomas Martin (cricketer) (1911–1937), Irish cricketer
- Tom Martin (ice hockey, born 1947), Canadian hockey player for the Maple Leafs
- Thomas Martin (judoka) (1956–2023), American judoka
- Tom Martin (ice hockey, born 1964), Canadian hockey player for the Jets, Whalers and North Stars
- Tom Martin (baseball) (born 1970), American baseball pitcher
- Thomas Martin (racing driver) (born 1978), American racecar driver
- Tommy Martin (boxer) (born 1994), British boxer

== Others ==
- Thomas Martin of Palgrave (1697–1771), British antiquary and book collector
- Sir Thomas Carlaw Martin (1850–1920), Scottish newspaper editor and director of the Royal Scottish Museum
- Thomas Martin (moderator) (1856–1942), Scottish minister, moderator of the General Assembly of the Church of Scotland
- Thomas Lyle Martin Jr. (1921–2009), American academic, president of the Illinois Institute of Technology
- Thomas R. Martin (born 1947), American historian at the College of the Holy Cross

== See also ==
- Martin Thomas (disambiguation)
- Thomas Martyn (disambiguation)
- Thomas Marten (disambiguation)
