= William Chapple (judge) =

British lawyer and politician

Sir William Chapple

Member of Parliament for Dorchester
- In office 1723–1737

Personal details
- Born: c. 1676
- Died: 15 March 1745 (aged 68–69)
- Political party: Whig
- Spouse: Trehane Clifton
- Children: 6
- Relatives: Fletcher Norton (son-in-law)

Sir William Chapple (c. 1676 – 15 March 1745) of Waybay House, Upwey, Dorset and Wonersh, Surrey, was a British lawyer and Whig politician who sat in the House of Commons from 1723 to 1737. He became a High Court Judge in 1737 and presided over the trial of highwayman Dick Turpin.

== Early life ==
Chapple was the second son of John Chapple of Waybay House, Upwey near Dorchester. He was admitted at Middle Temple in 1694 and called to the bar in 1709.

In 1710, he married Trehane Clifton, daughter of Susannah Clifton of Wonersh who was the niece and heiress of Richard Gwynne of Wonersh Park. He probably rebuilt the house at Wonersh Park.

== Career ==
At the 1722 British general election, Chapple stood for Dorchester with support of the Duke of Newcastle, and was returned as Whig Member of Parliament on petition on 13 February 1723. According to the 1st Earl of Egmont, when Chapple first entered the House, Arthur Onslow introduced him saying that 'one of the honestest men in England was come to sit among us.' In 1724, he became serjeant-at-law. He was returned unopposed at the 1727 British general election. He was knighted on 14 May 1729, also becoming King's serjeant.

Upon his appointment as Chief Justice of Carnarvon, Merioneth and Anglesey in 1729, he retained his seat in the consequential by-election. In Parliament he voted for the Administration on the civil list arrears in 1729, and on the army in 1732, but was absent for the Excise Bill in 1733. He seconded James Oglethorpe on 24 April 1732 in opposing the bill to void the contracts for the sale of the forfeited Derwentwater estates, and made a bad impression by speaking earnestly for the commissioners and purchasers and against such a bills. He was re-elected for Dorchester in a contest at the 1734 British general election but vacated his seat in 1737 when he was appointed a Hhigh Court Judge.

In March 1739, Chapple presided at the trial and ordered the execution of the highwayman Dick Turpin, then going under the name of John Palmer.

== Death and legacy ==
Chapple died on 15 March 1745, aged 68, and was buried in a tomb of black and white marble in Wonersh church. He and his wife left four sons, William, Richard, John, and Joseph, and two daughters, Jane and Grace who married Sir Fletcher Norton, afterwards Lord Grantley. His eldest son William was apparently married at Wonersh but the entry is erased to the extent that the name of his bride is obliterated – presumably in disapproval.

Parliament of Great Britain
Preceded by Edmund Morton Pleydell; Joseph Damer	Member of Parliament for Dorchester; 1723–1737; With: Joseph Damer; John Browne	Succeeded by Robert Browne; John Browne
