= Edmund Morton Pleydell =

Edmund Morton Pleydell (?1693-1754), of Milborne St. Andrew, Dorset, was an English politician who sat in the House of Commons between 1723 and 1747.

Pleydell was the fourth but eldest surviving son of Edmund Pleydell of Midgehall, Wiltshire and his wife Anne Morton, daughter of Sir John Morton, 2nd Baronet, MP of Milborne St. Andrew. He matriculated at Balliol College, Oxford on 10 April 1712, aged 18. He married by 1724, Deborah Kyffyn, daughter of William Kyffyn of Denbighshire. His father, whom he succeeded in 1726, was MP for Wootton Bassett, as were many members of the Pleydell family.

Pleydell was elected Member of Parliament (MP) for Dorchester at the 1722 general election but was unseated on petition on 13 February 1723. At the 1727 general election he was elected MP for Dorset in a contest. He was returned unopposed in the general elections of 1734 and 1741. He voted consistently against the Administration and did not stand in 1747.

Pleydell died on 16 March 1754 leaving four sons and three daughters.

Parliament of Great Britain
Preceded by Sir Nathaniel Napier, Bt; Abraham Janssen	Member of Parliament for Dorchester; 1722–1723; With: Joseph Damer	Succeeded by William Chapple; Joseph Damer
Preceded by George Chafin; George Pitt	Member of Parliament for Dorset; 1727–1747; With: George Chafin	Succeeded by George Chafin; George Pitt
