= Joseph Damer =

Joseph Damer may refer to:

- Joseph Damer, 1st Earl of Dorchester (1718–1798), landowner
- Joseph Damer (1676–1737), MP for Dorchester
