= Lonikand =

Village in Maharashtra

- village
- Location in Maharashtra, India Lonikand (India)
- Coordinates: 18.622°N 74.026°E
- Country: India
- State: Maharashtra
- District: Pune
- Taluka: Haveli

Population
  - Total: 7,944

Languages
  - Official: Marathi
- Time zone: UTC+5:30 (IST)
- Postal Index Number: 412216

Lonikand or Loni-kand (according to the Census Bureau) or Loni is a village panchayat located towards the northeast of Pune district in the Indian state of Maharashtra and is located in Haveli taluka. It is named after the Kands, the important family of the village. It is located 23 kilometres towards East from Pune, 29 kilometres from Haveli and 152 kilometres from the state capital Mumbai. Wagholi, Fulgaon, Tulapur, Wadebolhai, Perne, Burkhegaon, Vadu are some nearby villages of Lonikand. It is situated on Pune-Nagar State Highway No. 27. The nearest railway station to Lonikand is Hadapsar around 22 kilometres away. Lonikand's nearest airport is Pune Airport situated at 16.7 kilometres' distance. Situated from Pune on 23 kilometres' distance it can be reached by road.

== Demographics ==
It has an area of 1723.2 hectares. As of 2011 census Lonikand has a population of 7944 located in 1820 houses with 4230 males who constitute 53.24 per cent of the total population and 3714 females who constitute 46.75 per cent of the total population. Total literate population of the village is 5710 (71.86%) of which 3223 (40.57%) are males and 2487 (31.30%) are females. Literacy rate in the village is higher than that of Maharashtra state[84.50%] which was recorded as 82.91 percent for Maharashtra in 2011. Average sex ratio of the village is 878 females for each 1000 males which is lower than the Maharashtra average of 929 females per 1000 males.

== Facilities ==
There are three primary schools, one middle school and one secondary school in Lonikand. They are the following

- Holy Spirit Convent School
- Dr Basu Vidyadham school
- Zilla Parishad Primary school
- Matoshri Sulochana Pratishthan's HD English Medium School

College available within the range is 5-10 kilometres away from the village. Allopathic hospital available within the range is between 5 and 10 kilometres. Maternity and child welfare centre is available at 10 kilometres' distance from the village.

There is a 400 KV electricity substation in the village.

== Economy ==
The village is basically an agricultural village though the two principal occupations in the village are stone quarries and warehousing.

== Temples ==
The prominent temple of the village is Vitthal Rukmini Temple . It also has a Mahadev temple and a Hanuman temple.
