= William Holman (disambiguation) =

William Holman (1871–1934) was the Premier of New South Wales, Australia.

William Holman may also refer to:

- Bill Holman (musician) (1927–2024), American saxophonist, composer, arranger
- Bill Holman (cartoonist) (1903–1987), creator of the comic strip Smokey Stover
- William S. Holman (1822–1897), lawyer, judge and politician from Dearborn County, Indiana
- William Alfred Holman (1864–1949), New Zealand architect
- Willie Holman (1945–2002), American football player
- William Holman (MP for Dorchester)
- William Holman (antiquary) (died 1730), English antiquarian
