= Mayor of Dorchester =

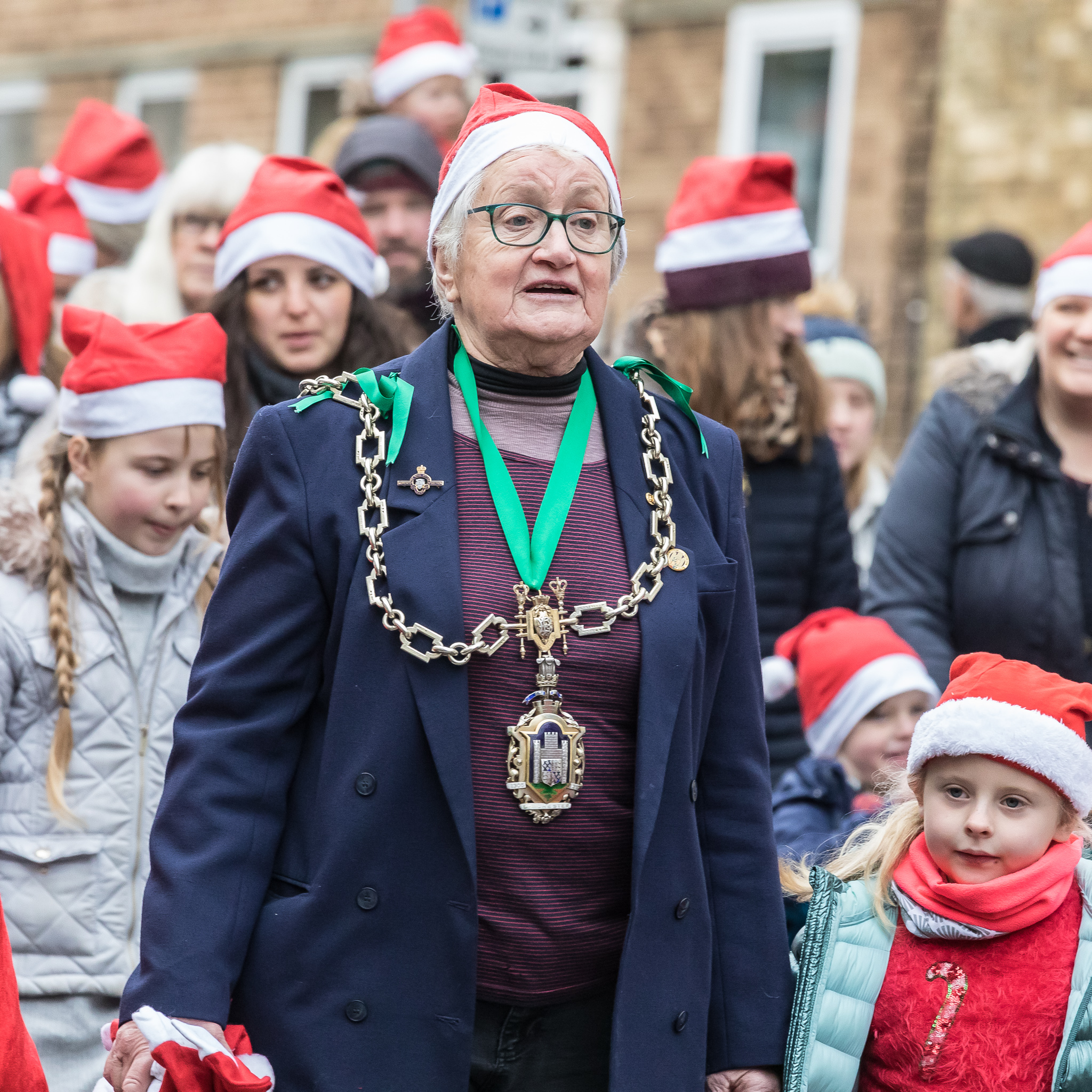
Dorchester Mayor Janet Hewitt in the Santa Hat Parade in 2022

John Parkin was the first mayor when he was elected in 1629. The first woman to serve as mayor was Winifrede Marsden in 1930. Stella Jones MBE has been mayor three times and she was also the mayoress three times when her husband Trevor was mayor.

The following have been elected mayors of Dorchester, Dorset, England:

- 1629–30: John Parkins, MP for Dorchester, 1621
- 1631–32: William Whiteway, MP for Dorchester, 1624, 1625
- 1635–36: Denis Bond MP for Dorchester, 1640
- 1636–37: John Hill, MP for Dorchester, 1628
- 1637–38: James Gould, snr, MP for Dorchester, 1659, 1661
- 1644–45: John Bushrode, MP for Dorchester, 1659
- 1645–46: John Whiteway, MP for Dorchester, 1654, 1656, 1660
- 1655–56: John Bushrode, MP for Dorchester, 1659
- 1658–59: John Whiteway, MP for Dorchester, 1654, 1656, 1660
- 1677–78: James Gould, jnr, MP for Dorchester, 1677, 1680, 1681, 1690
- 1680–81: Nicholas Gould MP for Dorchester, 1679
- 1682: Charles Stoodley
- 1683: John Oldis
- 1684: William Pitt
- 1685: Alexander Haviland
- 1686: John Nelson
- 1687: George Lester
- 1688: Hugh Baker
- 1689: Richard Cooper and Thomas Blandford
- 1690: Maximilian Gollop
- 1691: Daniel Arden
- 1692: Thomas Delacourt
- 1693: Thomas Seward
- 1694: Andrew Loder
- 1695: John Gollop
- 1696: James Gould
- 1697: John Yeat
- 1698: Robert Weare
- 1699: Henry Whiffen
- 1700: Richard Samways
- 1701: John Haviland
- 1702: John Oldis
- 1703: Maximilian Gollop

...

- 1902-03: Stephen D. Allen, Conservative (re-elected)
- 1930-31:Winifrede Marsden

...

- 1950-51: Nancy Jackman

...

- 1988: E. Stella Jones
- 1989: Dennis G. Maggs
- 1990: Elizabeth G. Boothman
- 1991:: M. Diana Dowell
- 1992:D. Trevor Jones
- 1993: Mary E. (Molly) Rennie
- 1994: John H. Antell
- 1995: Timothy C.N. Harries
- 1996: Peter A.A. Scott
- 1997: Richard M. Biggs
- 1998: John H. Antell
- 1999: Leslie M. Phillips
- 2000–01: E. Stella Jones
- 2001–02: Walter G. Gundry
- 2002–03: D. Trevor Jones
- 2003–04: Mary E. Rennie
- 2004–05: Timothy C. N. Harries
- 2005–06: Richard M. Biggs
- 2006–07: Robert (Robin) Potter
- 2007–08: David J. Barrett
- 2008–09: Catherine M. Hebditch
- 2009–10: Susan C Hosford
- 2010–11: Leslie M. Phillips
- 2011–12: Tess James
- 2012–13: Andy Canning
- 2013–14: E.Stella Jones
- 2014–15: Peter Mann
- 2015–16: Robin Potter
- 2016–17: Timothy C. N. Harries
- 2017–18: Susan C Hosford
- 2018–19: David Taylor
- 2019-21: Richard M. Biggs

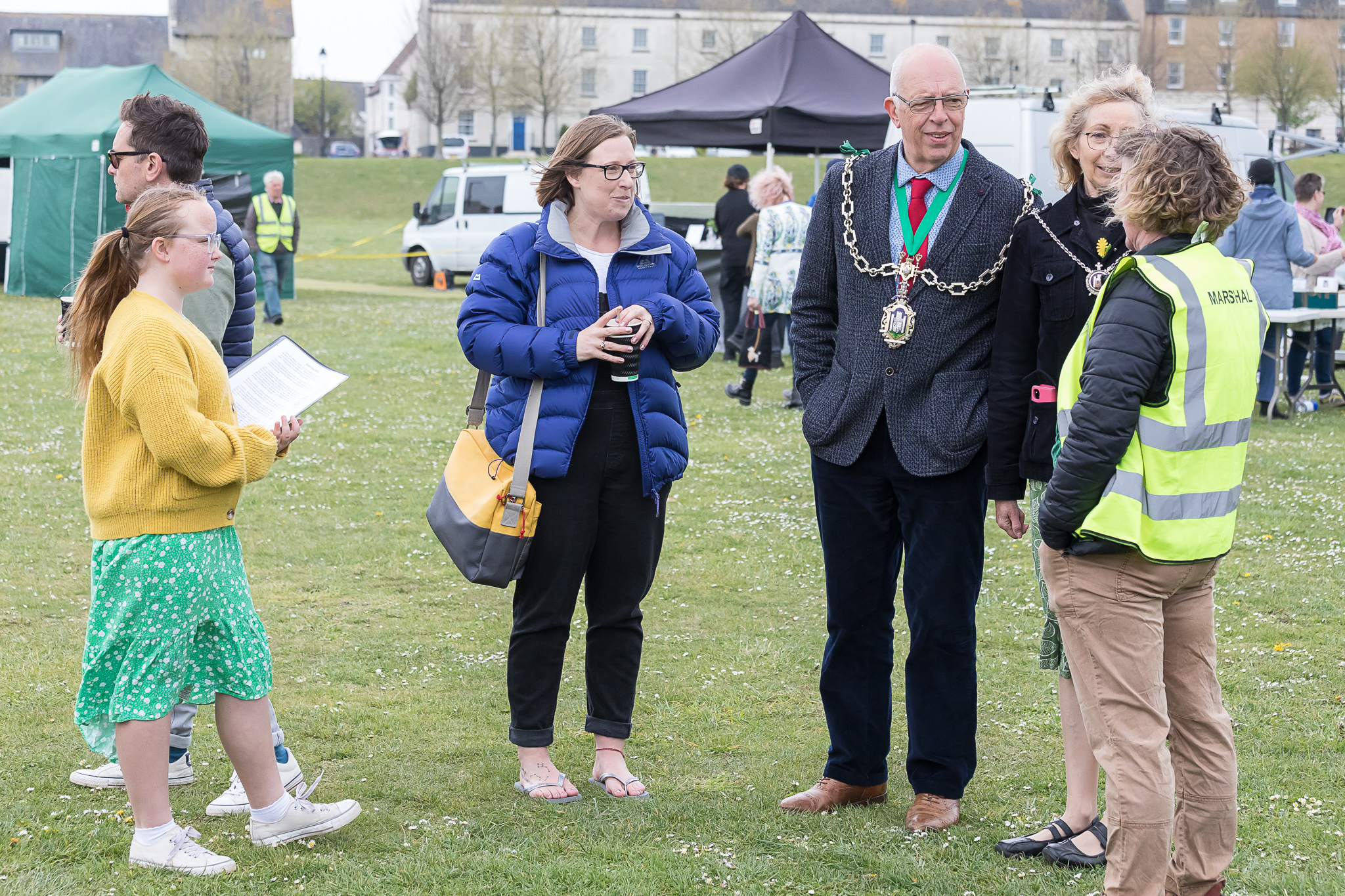
The Mayor at Dorchester Earth Fair on Earth Day in 2022

- 2021-22: Gareth Jones
- 2022-23: Janet Hewitt
- 2023-2024 Alastair Chisholm
- 2024-2025 Robin Potter
- 2025-2026 Andy Canning
- 2026-2027 Les Fry
