= John Churchill (1657–1709) =

English lawyer and Whig politician

John Churchill (1657–1709) of Colliton House and Fordington, Dorchester, Dorset, was an English lawyer and Whig politician who sat in the House of Commons briefly from 1708 to 1709.

Churchill was baptized on 10 February 1657, the second son of William Churchill of Muston, Dorset and his wife Grace Meller, the daughter of MP, John Meller. He was admitted at Inner Temple in 1675 and matriculated at Trinity College, Oxford in 1676. In 1683, he was called to the bar. He married under a settlement dated 8 July 1693, Anne Darrel, widow of John Darrel and daughter of Roger Clavell of Smedmore, Dorset.

Churchill was returned as Member of Parliament (MP) for Dorchester at the 1708 British general election, when he was marked by Lord Sunderland as a gain for the Whigs. There were several other Churchills in the House of Commons, which makes it difficult to identify any of Churchill's contributions.

Churchill died without issue on 24 April 1709 and was buried in the Temple Church, London. He left his estate firstly to his widow, who died in 1722, and upon her death to his brother Charles Churchill.

Parliament of Great Britain
Preceded by Awnsham Churchill; Nathaniel Napier	Member of Parliament for Dorchester; 1708–1709; With: Awnsham Churchill	Succeeded by Awnsham Churchill; Denis Bond
