= Owen Hayman =

English politician (c.1508–c.1565)

Owen Hayman (by 1508 – 1565 or later), of Dorchester, Dorset, was an English politician, barber and property owner.

He was a Member (MP) of the Parliament of England for Dorchester in April 1554.
