= Thomas Martyn (disambiguation) =

Thomas Martyn (1735–1825) was an English botanist.

Thomas Martyn may also refer to:

- Thomas J. C. Martyn (1896–1979), British aviator, journalist, founder of American magazine Newsweek
- Thomas Martyn (zoologist) (c. 1760–1816), English zoologist, conchologist and entomologist
- Tommy Martyn (born 1971), rugby league footballer who played in the 1980s, 1990s and 2000s, and coached in the 2000s
- Thomas Martyn (rugby league) (1946/47–2016), rugby league footballer who played in the 1970s
- Thomas Óge Martyn (died 1577), mayor of Galway

== See also ==
- Thomas Martin (disambiguation)
- Thomas Marten (disambiguation)
