= John Gryffyn =

English politician

John Gryffyn, of Dorchester and Middleton, Dorset, was an English politician.

He married Margaret, the widow of John Fytheler, and had a stepson, William Fytheler. There is no record of him having children of his own.

He was a Member (MP) of the Parliament of England for Dorchester in April 1414.
