= Charles Napier Sturt (1832–1886) =

English soldier and politician

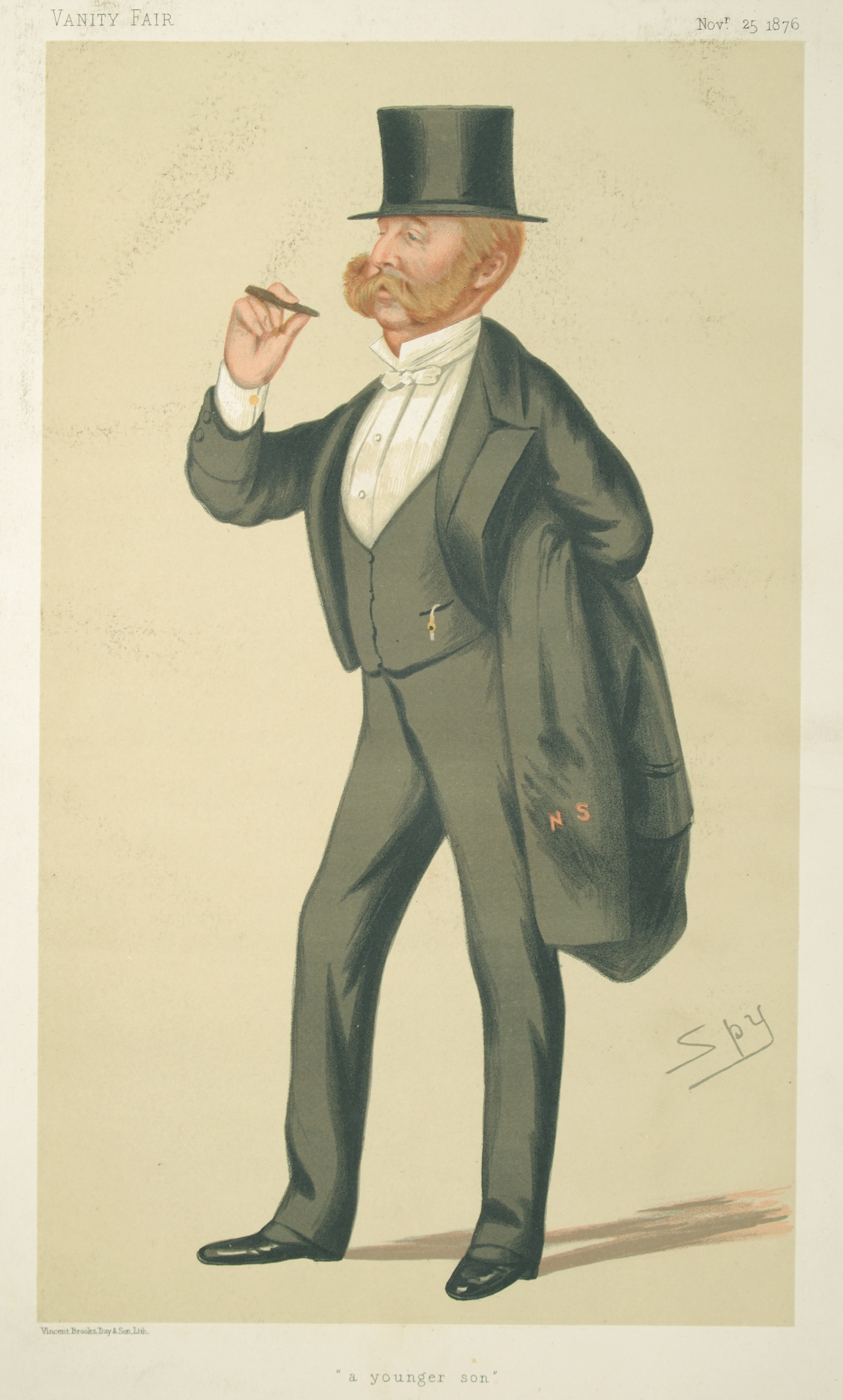
- 1876 caricature of Sturt

Member of Parliament for Dorchester
- In office July 1856 – 1874 Serving with Richard Brinsley Sheridan (1856-1868)
- Preceded by: Henry Sturt
- Succeeded by: William Brymer

Personal details
- Born: 9 August 1832 London, England
- Died: 13 March 1886 (aged 53) Hampshire, England
- Party: Conservative
- Parent: Henry Sturt (father)
- Relatives: Henry Sturt (brother); Charles Sturt (grandfather); Robert Brudenell (grandfather)
- Military career
- Allegiance: United Kingdom
- Service years: 1851-1854
- Unit: Grenadier Guards
- Wars: Crimean War; Battle of Inkerman

Colonel Charles Napier Sturt (9 August 1832 – 13 March 1886) was an English soldier and politician.

== Biography ==
Sturt was born in London in 1832, the son of Henry Sturt of Dorset and Charlotte Penelope Brudenell, daughter of the Robert Brudenell, 6th Earl of Cardigan. In 1851 he joined the Grenadier Guards; in 1854 he served with 3rd Battalion in the Crimea War, where he was seriously wounded at the Battle of Inkerman.

On returning from the war Sturt stood as Member of Parliament for Dorchester and was elected in a by-election in July 1856. He was MP for Dorchester 1856 to 1874. He was a Conservative.

Sturt died at Winchester Barrack on 13 March 1886, aged 54.
