= William Chuse =

English politician

William Chuse, of Dorchester, Dorset, was an English politician.

== Family ==
He married a woman named Alice.

== Career ==
He was a member (MP) of the parliament of England for Dorchester in September 1388.
