= John Ford (fl. 1410–1426) =

Member of the Parliament of England

John Ford (fl. 1410–1426), of Dorset, was an English lawyer and politician. He was a Member (MP) of the Parliament of England for Melcombe Regis in 1410, for Dorchester in 1417, 1419, 1420, May 1421, Dec. 1421, 1422 and 1423, and for Shaftesbury in 1426. Nothing is known of his family.
