= John Westpray =

English politician

John Westpray (died 1413), of Dorchester, Dorset, was an English politician.

He married a woman named Maud, who also died in 1413, and they had one daughter. He was a Member (MP) of the Parliament of England for Dorchester in 1399.
