= Reynold Jacob =

Member of the Parliament of England

Member of Parliament for Dorchester
- In office 1417–1422

Personal details
- Died: 1424 Dorchester, Dorset, England
- Spouse: Joan
- Children: One illegitimate son
- Occupation: Politician, cloth trader

Reynold Jacob (died 1424), of Dorchester, Dorset, was an English politician and cloth trader.

He married a woman named Joan, and had one illegitimate son.

He was a Member (MP) of the Parliament of England for Dorchester in 1417 and 1422.
