= John Blount (died 1417) =

English politician

John Blount (died 1417), of Dorchester, Dorset, was an English politician, saddler, and cloth merchant.

He was a Member of the Parliament of England (MP) for Dorchester in January 1390, 1395, 1399, January 1404 and April 1414. He was the younger brother of Peter Blount, who was also an MP.
