= Thomas Marten =

Thomas Marten may refer to:

- Thomas Marten (British Army officer) (1797–1868), British lieutenant-general
- J. Thomas Marten (born 1951), United States federal judge

== See also ==
- Thomas Martin (disambiguation)
- Thomas Martyn (disambiguation)
