= John Bushrode =

English merchant and politician

John Bushrode (1612 - c 1684) was an English merchant and politician who sat in the House of Commons in 1659.

Bushrode was the son of Richard Bushrode, merchant adventurer of Dorchester, and his wife Dorthy Watts and was baptised on 23 April 1612 at Holy Trinity Dorchester. When he was 14 he was apprenticed to John Dale, a clothier and he became a clothier himself. In 1631 and 1632 he was an enthusiastic constable for Dorchester. He became assistant governor of Dorchester in 1633 and was elected a burgess on 4 September 1639. In 1643, he took on the stewardship of the brewhouse. He was elected Mayor of Dorchester in 1644 and in 1655. In 1659, he was elected Member of Parliament for Dorchester in the Third Protectorate Parliament. He lived in a house just west of the gaol in Dorchester.

Bushrode died at the age of 71 and was buried in All Saints church Dorchester on 3 January 1684.

Parliament of England
Preceded by John Whiteway	Member of Parliament for Dorchester; 1659; With: James Gould	Succeeded by Not represented in Restored Rump
