= Lamer (surname) =

Lamer is a surname. Notable people with the surname include:

- Thomas Lamer (died 1397/1398), English politician
- Antonio Lamer (1933–2007), Canadian lawyer

== See also ==
- Hamer (surname)
- Ine Lamers (born 1954), Dutch photographer and video installation artist
