= William Ash (MP) =

English politician

William Ash (died 1411), of Dorchester, Dorset, was an English politician.

He married a woman named Eleanor, who died in 1416.

He was a member (MP) of the Parliament of England for Dorchester in 1394. He was also bailiff of Dorchester from Michaelmas 1396 to 1397, 1399 to 1400, and 1405 to 1406. Over the years Ash was much involved both as grantor and recipient in conveyances of property in Dorchester.
