= Lewis Montgomery =

16th-century English politician

Lewis Montgomery (died 1568), of Ecton, Northamptonshire, was an English politician.

== Family ==
Montgomery was the first husband of Jane Lane; they had no surviving children and his heirs were his siblings.

== Education and career ==
He was educated at Gray's Inn. He was a Member (MP) of the Parliament of England for Northampton in 1563; he had also been returned for Dorchester but chose Northampton.
