= John Spicer (died 1623) =

English politician and tailor

John Spicer (died 26 December 1623), of Pease Lane, Dorchester, Dorset, was an English politician and tailor.

== Family ==
He married Thomasine Read and they had two sons, including Walter Spicer.

== Career ==
He was a Member (MP) of the Parliament of England for Dorchester in 1604.
