= Pernes =

Pernes may refer to:

== Places ==
- Pernes, Pas-de-Calais
- Bailleul-lès-Pernes, Pas-de-Calais
- La Roque-sur-Pernes, Vaucluse
- Pernes-lès-Boulogne, Pas-de-Calais
- Pernes-les-Fontaines, Vaucluse
- Sains-lès-Pernes, Pas-de-Calais
- Pernes, a parish in Santarém, Portugal

== People ==
- Fernando Pernes (1936–2010), Portuguese essayist, professor and art critic
- Jiří Pernes (1948–2025), Czech historian
- Thomas Pernes (1956–2018), Austrian avant-garde composer and performance artist

== See also ==
- Perne, a surname
