= John Stork =

Member of the Parliament of England

John Stork (died c. 1466), of Trent, Somerset, was an English politician and lawyer.

Stork married Alice, the widow of John Petyr. They had one son and she died after Stork, in 1474.

He was a Member (MP) of the Parliament of England for Dorchester in 1420 and May 1421.
