= Dorchester (constituency) =

Former parliamentary constituency in the United Kingdom

Dorchester was a parliamentary constituency centred on the town of Dorchester in Dorset. It returned two Members of Parliament to the House of Commons of England, Great Britain and House of Commons of the Parliament of the United Kingdom from 1295 to 1868, when its representation was reduced to one member.

The constituency was abolished by the Redistribution of Seats Act 1885, after which Dorchester was placed in the new Dorset South constituency. In 1918 it was transferred to Dorset West, where it has remained since.

== Members of Parliament ==
=== 1295-1629 ===
Parliament	First member	Second member
1386	Henry Cravell	Peter Blount
1388 (Feb)	John Perle	Thomas Lamer
1388 (Sep)	William Chuse	Thomas Gardener
1390 (Jan)	William Tylle	John Blount
1390 (Nov)		
1391	Thomas Lamer	John Gould
1393	Robert Gutton	Thomas Gardener
1394	William Pullare	William Ash
1395	John Blount	Thomas Hussey
1397 (Jan)	Robert Veel	John Jordan
1397 (Sep)	Robert Gutton	John Jordan
1399	John Blount	John Westpray
1401		
1402	John Bomel	John Jordan
1404 (Jan)	John Blount	John Jordan
1404 (Oct)		
1406	Richard Hyde	John Jordan
1407	John Cheverell	John Jordan
1410	John Jordan	
1411		
1413 (Feb)		
1413 (May)	Walter Tracy	William Newton
1414 (Apr)	John Blount	John Gryffyn
1414 (Nov)	John Jordan	Richard Berell
1415		
1416 (Mar)		
1416 (Oct)		
1417	Reynold Jacob	John Ford
1419	John Ford	
1420	John Stork	John Ford
1421 (May)	John Stork	John Ford
1421 (Dec)	Robert Mose	John Ford
Second Parliament of 1553	Christopher Hole	William Holman
Parliament of 1554	Christopher Hole	Owen Hayman
Parliament of 1554–1555	Christopher Hole	John Davy
Parliament of 1555	Robert Robotham	Ralph Perne
Parliament of 1558	Christopher Hole	John Hayward
Parliament of 1559	William Holman	John Leweston
Parliament of 1563–1567	Thomas Marten	Lewis Montgomery Chose to sit for Northampton; By-election John Gardiner
Parliament of 1571	Henry Macwilliam	William Adyn
Parliament of 1572–1581	George Carleton	George Trenchard
Parliament of 1584–1585	Robert Beale	Thomas Freke
Parliament of 1586–1587	Robert Beale	Robert Napier
Parliament of 1588–1589	Robert Beale	Nowell Sotherton
Parliament of 1593	Dr Francis James	Thomas Dabridgecourt
Parliament of 1597–1598	Robert Ashley	Richard Wright
Parliament of 1601	Henry Brouncker	Matthew Chubbe
Parliament of 1604–1611	John Spicer	Matthew Chubbe
Addled Parliament (1614)	Francis Ashley	George Horsey
Parliament of 1621–1622	Sir Francis Ashley	John Parkins
Happy Parliament (1624–1625)	William Whiteway	Richard Bushrode
Useless Parliament (1625)	Sir Francis Ashley	William Whiteway
Parliament of 1625–1626	Michael Humphreys died replaced by William Whiteway jnr	Richard Bushrode
Parliament of 1628–1629	Denzil Holles	John Hill
No Parliament summoned 1629-1640

=== 1640-1868 ===
Year	First Member	First Party	Second Member	Second Party
April 1640	Denzil Holles	Parliamentarian	Denis Bond	Parliamentarian
November 1640	Denzil Holles	Parliamentarian	Denis Bond	Parliamentarian
December 1648	Holles excluded in Pride's Purge - seat vacant		Denis Bond	Parliamentarian
1653	Dorchester was unrepresented in the Barebones Parliament			
1654	John Whiteway		Dorchester had only one seat in the First and Second Parliaments of the Protectorate	
1656	John Whiteway		Dorchester had only one seat in the First and Second Parliaments of the Protectorate	
January 1659	James Gould		John Bushrode	
May 1659	Dorchester was not represented in the restored Rump			
April 1660	Denzil Holles		John Whiteway	
March 1661	Denzil Holles		James Gould	
May 1661	John Churchill		James Gould	
1677	John Churchill		James Gould	
1679	Sir Francis Holles		Nicholas Gould	
1680	James Gould		Nicholas Gould	
1681	James Gould		Nathaniel Bond	
1685	Edward Meller		William Churchill	
January 1689	Gerard Napier		Thomas Trenchard	
December 1689	Thomas Chafin		Thomas Trenchard	
March 1690	James Gould		Sir Robert Napier, Bt	
December 1690	James Gould		Thomas Trenchard	
1695	Nathaniel Bond		Nathaniel Napier	
1698	Sir Robert Napier, Bt		Nathaniel Napier	
1701	Thomas Trenchard		Nathaniel Napier	
1702	Sir Nathaniel Napier, Bt		Nathaniel Napier	
1705	Awnsham Churchill		Nathaniel Napier	
1708	Awnsham Churchill		John Churchill	
1709	Awnsham Churchill		Denis Bond	
1710	Sir Nathaniel Napier, Bt		Benjamin Gifford	
1713	Sir Nathaniel Napier, Bt		Henry Trenchard	
April 1720	Sir Nathaniel Napier, Bt		Robert Browne	
May 1720	Sir Nathaniel Napier, Bt		Abraham Janssen	
1722	Edmund Morton Pleydell		Joseph Damer	
1723	William Chapple		Joseph Damer	
1727	William Chapple		John Browne	
1737	Robert Browne		John Browne	
1741	Nathaniel Gundry		John Browne	
1751	George Damer		John Pitt	
1752	George Clavell		John Pitt	
1754	The Lord Milton		John Pitt	
1761	The Lord Milton		Thomas Foster	
1762	John Damer	Tory	Thomas Foster	
1765	John Damer	Tory	William Ewer	Tory
1780	Hon. George Damer	Tory	William Ewer	Tory
1789	Hon. George Damer	Tory	Thomas Ewer	Tory
Jan. 1790	Hon. George Damer	Tory	Hon. Cropley Ashley	Tory
Jun. 1790	Hon. George Damer	Whig	Francis Fane	Tory
1791	Hon. Cropley Ashley	Tory	Francis Fane	Tory
1807	Hon. Cropley Ashley	Tory	Robert Williams	Whig
1811	Charles Henry Bouverie		Robert Williams	Whig
October 1812	Charles Henry Bouverie		Robert Williams	
December 1812	William A'Court		Robert Williams	
1814	Sir Samuel Shepherd		Robert Williams	
1819	Charles Warren		Robert Williams	
1826	William Ashley-Cooper	Tory	Robert Williams	Tory
Apr. 1830	Henry Sturt		Robert Williams	Tory
Aug. 1830	Lord Ashley	Tory	Robert Williams	Tory
1831	Hon. Henry Ashley-Cooper	Tory	Robert Williams	Tory
1834	Hon. Henry Ashley-Cooper	Conservative	Robert Williams	Conservative
1835	Hon. Henry Ashley-Cooper	Conservative	Robert Williams	Conservative
1841	Hon. Henry Ashley-Cooper	Conservative	Sir James Graham, Bt	Conservative
1847	Hon. George Dawson-Damer	Conservative	Henry Sturt	Conservative
1852	Richard Brinsley Sheridan	Whig	Henry Sturt	Conservative
1856	Richard Brinsley Sheridan	Whig	Charles Napier Sturt	Conservative
1859	Richard Brinsley Sheridan	Liberal	Charles Napier Sturt	Conservative
1868	Representation reduced to one member			

=== 1868-1885 ===
Election	Member	Party
1868	Representation reduced to one member	
1868	Charles Napier Sturt	Conservative
1874	William Brymer	Conservative
1885	Constituency abolished	

== Election results ==
=== Elections in the 1830s ===
By-election, 10 April 1830: Dorchester
Party	Candidate	Votes	%	±%
No label	Henry Sturt	Unopposed		
Registered electors		c. 500		
No label gain from Tory				

General election 1830: Dorchester
Party	Candidate	Votes	%	±%
Tory	Robert Williams, senior	Unopposed		
Tory	Anthony Ashley-Cooper	Unopposed		
Registered electors		c. 500		
Tory hold				
Tory hold				

General election 1831: Dorchester
Party	Candidate	Votes	%	±%
Tory	Robert Williams, senior	Unopposed		
Tory	Anthony Ashley-Cooper	Unopposed		
Registered electors		c. 500		
Tory hold				
Tory hold				

Ashley-Cooper resigned, causing a by-election.

By-election, 11 October 1831: Dorchester
Party	Candidate	Votes	%	±%
Tory	Henry Ashley-Cooper	Unopposed		
Registered electors		c. 500		
Tory hold				

General election 1832: Dorchester
Party	Candidate	Votes	%	±%
Tory	Robert Williams, senior	Unopposed		
Tory	Henry Ashley-Cooper	Unopposed		
Registered electors		322		
Tory hold				
Tory hold				

General election 1835: Dorchester
Party	Candidate	Votes	%	±%
Conservative	Robert Williams, junior	Unopposed		
Conservative	Henry Ashley-Cooper	Unopposed		
Registered electors		318		
Conservative hold				
Conservative hold				

General election 1837: Dorchester
Party	Candidate	Votes	%	±%
Conservative	Robert Williams, junior	Unopposed		
Conservative	Henry Ashley-Cooper	Unopposed		
Registered electors		397		
Conservative hold				
Conservative hold				

=== Elections in the 1840s ===
General election 1841: Dorchester
Party	Candidate	Votes	%	±%
Conservative	Henry Ashley	Unopposed		
Conservative	James Graham	Unopposed		
Registered electors		367		
Conservative hold				
Conservative hold				

Graham was appointed Home Secretary, requiring a by-election.

By-election, 13 September 1841: Dorchester
Party	Candidate	Votes	%	±%
Conservative	James Graham	Unopposed		
Conservative hold				

General election 1847: Dorchester
Party	Candidate	Votes	%	±%
Conservative	George Dawson-Damer	Unopposed		
Conservative	Henry Sturt	Unopposed		
Registered electors		405		
Conservative hold				
Conservative hold				

=== Elections in the 1850s ===
General election 1852: Dorchester
Party	Candidate	Votes	%	±%
Whig	Richard Brinsley Sheridan	235	36.9	New
Conservative	Henry Sturt	215	33.8	N/A
Conservative	George Dawson-Damer	186	29.2	N/A
Majority		20	3.1	N/A
Turnout		318 (est)	73.6 (est)	N/A
Registered electors		432		
Whig gain from Conservative		Swing	N/A	
Conservative hold		Swing	N/A	

Sturt resigned in order to contest the 1856 by-election in Dorset, causing a by-election.

By-election, 22 July 1856: Dorchester
Party	Candidate	Votes	%	±%
Conservative	Charles Napier Sturt	Unopposed		
Conservative hold				

General election 1857: Dorchester
Party	Candidate	Votes	%	±%
Whig	Richard Brinsley Sheridan	Unopposed		
Conservative	Charles Napier Sturt	Unopposed		
Registered electors		451		
Whig hold				
Conservative hold				

General election 1859: Dorchester
Party	Candidate	Votes	%	±%
Liberal	Richard Brinsley Sheridan	Unopposed		
Conservative	Charles Napier Sturt	Unopposed		
Registered electors		442		
Liberal hold				
Conservative hold				

=== Elections in the 1860s ===
General election 1865: Dorchester
Party	Candidate	Votes	%	±%
Conservative	Charles Napier Sturt	268	42.8	N/A
Liberal	Richard Brinsley Sheridan	255	40.7	N/A
Conservative	Henry Drummond Wolff	103	16.5	N/A
Turnout		313 (est)	72.5 (est)	N/A
Registered electors		432		
Majority		13	2.1	N/A
Conservative hold		Swing	N/A	
Majority		152	24.2	N/A
Liberal hold		Swing	N/A	

Seat reduced to one member

General election 1868: Dorchester
Party	Candidate	Votes	%	±%
Conservative	Charles Napier Sturt	Unopposed		
Registered electors		628		
Conservative hold				

=== Elections in the 1870s ===
General election 1874: Dorchester
Party	Candidate	Votes	%	±%
Conservative	William Brymer	353	60.2	N/A
Liberal	Sir Francis Somerville Head, 2nd Baronet	233	39.8	New
Majority		120	20.4	N/A
Turnout		586	85.2	N/A
Registered electors		688		
Conservative hold		Swing	N/A	

=== Elections in the 1880s ===
General election 1880: Dorchester
Party	Candidate	Votes	%	±%
Conservative	William Brymer	374	53.0	−7.2
Liberal	Algernon Greville	332	47.0	+7.2
Majority		42	6.0	−14.4
Turnout		706	86.4	+1.2
Registered electors		817		
Conservative hold		Swing	−7.2	
