= Robert Robotham =

16th-century English politician

Robert Robotham (by 1522 – 1570/71), of London, Hartington, Derbyshire and Raskelf, Yorkshire, was an English politician.

He was a member (MP) of the parliament of England for Reigate in March 1553, for Dorchester in 1555 and for Reading in 1563.
