= Henry Trenchard (Dorchester MP) =

Henry Trenchard (1668–1720), of Little Fulford, Devon, was an English Tory politician who sat in the House of Commons from 1713 to 1720.

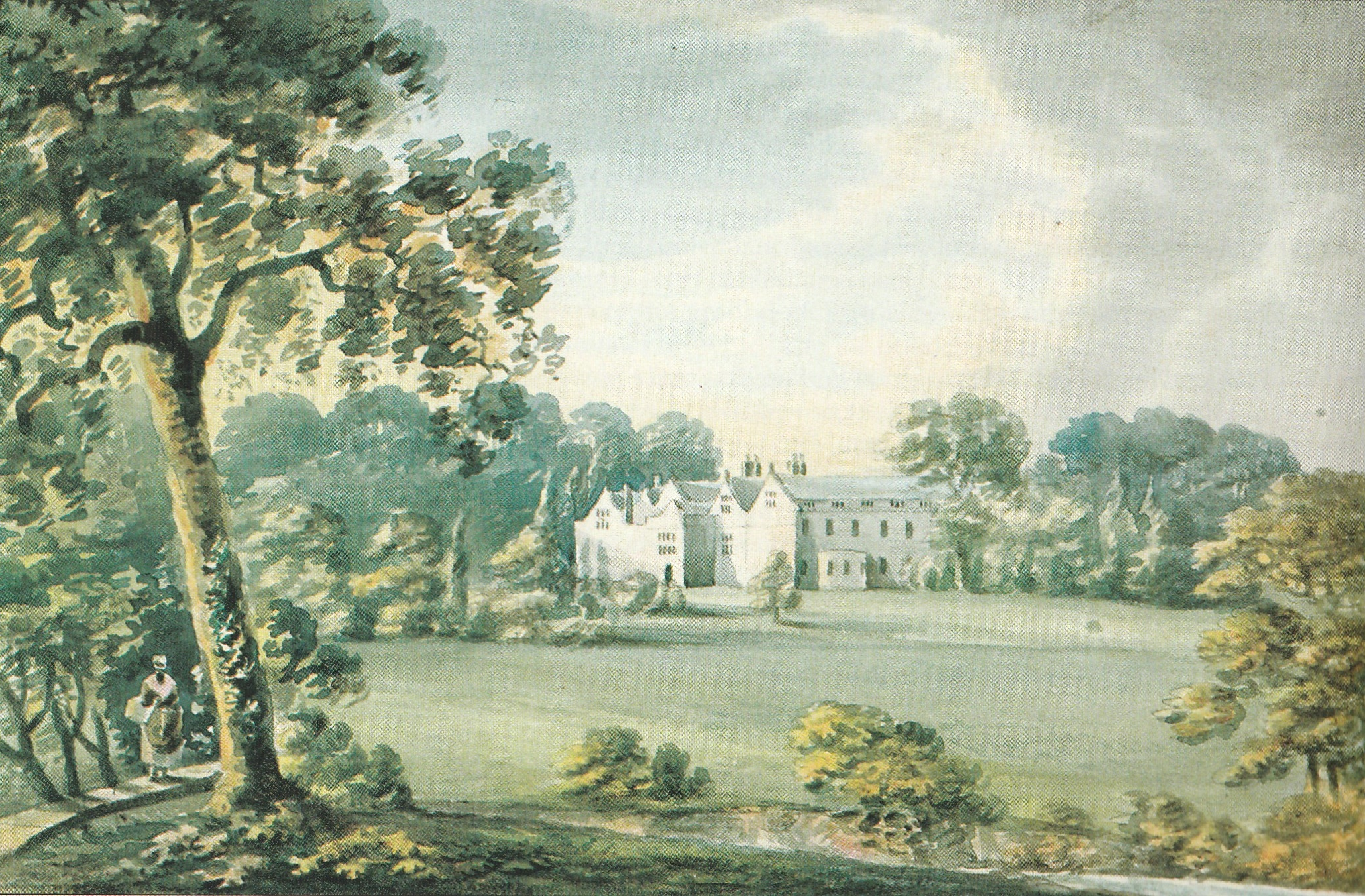
Little Fulford House, near Crediton, Devon

Trenchard was the son of George Trenchard of Charminster, Dorset and his wife Mary. In 1690 he enlisted as a Cornet into the Marquis of Winchester's volunteer regiment of Horse, transferring as a lieutenant to his cousin Thomas Erle's Regiment of Foot in 1694, and was a lieutenant in the 34th Foot in 1702. He married Mary Fulford, the widow of Francis Fulford of Fulford, and daughter and heiress of John Tuckfield of Little Fulford House, Devon on 20 February 1705. The marriage brought him the Fulford estate.

Trenchard was elected as Member of Parliament (MP) for Dorchester in a contest at the 1713 general election. He was a Tory, though from a Whig family. He was returned unopposed at the 1715 general election and sat until his death in 1720. He made little impression in Parliament.

Trenchard died without issue on 18 March 1720.

Parliament of Great Britain
Preceded by Sir Nathaniel Napier, Bt; Benjamin Gifford	Member of Parliament for Dorchester; 1713–1720; With: Sir Nathaniel Napier, Bt	Succeeded by Sir Nathaniel Napier, Bt; Robert Browne
