= George Dawson-Damer =

British politician (1788-1856)

Colonel The Right Honourable George Dawson-Damer CB

Comptroller of the Household
- In office 9 September 1841 – 30 June 1846
- Monarch: Victoria
- Prime Minister: Sir Robert Peel, Bt
- Preceded by: Lord Marcus Hill
- Succeeded by: Lord Marcus Hill

Personal details
- Born: 28 October 1788
- Died: 14 April 1856 (aged 67)
- Resting place: St Peter's Church, Winterborne Came
- Party: Conservative
- Spouse: Mary Seymour (m. 1825; died 1848)
- Parent: John Dawson, 1st Earl of Portarlington (father)
- Relatives: Lionel Dawson-Damer (son); Henry Dawson-Damer (cousin)
- Military career
- Allegiance: United Kingdom
- Branch: British Army
- Rank: Colonel
- Unit: 1st King's Dragoon Guards
- Conflicts: Napoleonic Wars; Retreat of the French cavalry from Moscow; Battle of Lützen; Battle of Bautzen; Battle of Kulm; Battle of Wurzen; Siege of Hamburg; Battle of Quatre Bras; Battle of Waterloo
- Awards: Order of the Bath

Colonel George Lionel Dawson-Damer CB PC (28 October 1788 – 14 April 1856) was a British Conservative Party politician.

== Background ==
Dawson-Damer was a younger son of John Dawson, 1st Earl of Portarlington, and Lady Caroline, daughter of Prime Minister John Stuart, 3rd Earl of Bute. He assumed the additional name of Damer by royal sign-manual in 1829 on succeeding to a portion of the estates of his aunt, Lady Caroline Damer.

== Military career ==
While on the staff of Sir Robert Wilson he was present with the Russian army at the retreat of the French cavalry from Moscow in October 1812. In 1813 he was at the battles of Lützen, Bautzen, Dresden, Kulm, Wurzen, and the Siege of Hamburg and the operation at Holstein. In 1815 he was appointed quartermaster general to the Prince of Orange, under whom he served in the 1st King's Dragoon Guards and was present at the battles at Quatre Bras and Waterloo, where he was wounded and had two horses shot under him and for which he was made a Companion of the Order of the Bath (CB).

== Political career ==
Dawson-Damer was returned to Parliament for Portarlington in 1835, a seat he held until 1847, and served under Sir Robert Peel as Comptroller of the Household from 1841 to 1846. Between 1847 and 1852 he represented Dorchester in the House of Commons.

== Family ==
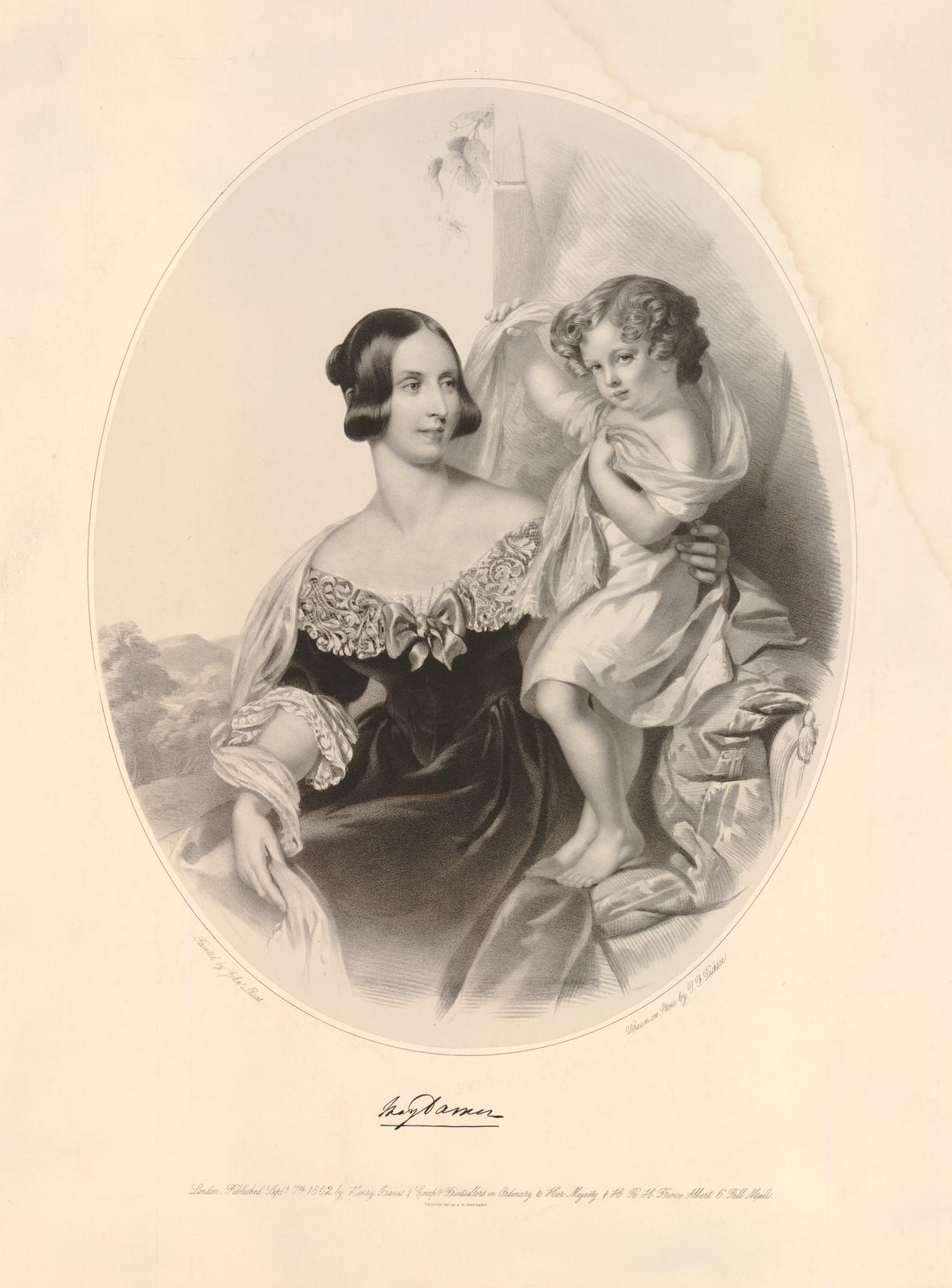
Mary Dawson-Damer with her son Lionel by Thomas Francis Dicksee

Dawson-Damer married Mary Georgiana Emma, daughter of Lord Hugh Seymour and Lady Anne Horatia Waldegrave, in 1825. She was the author of Diary of A Tour in Greece, Turkey, Egypt, and The Holy Land (1841). They had five daughters and one son:

- Lady Georgiana Augusta Charlotte Caroline Dawson-Damer - Hugh Fortescue, 3rd Earl Fortescue
- Lady Evelyn Mary Stuart Dawson-Damer
- Lady Cecilia Blanche Horatia Seymour Dawson-Damer
- Alice Henrietta Dawson-Damer
- Lady Constance Wilhelmina Frances Dawson-Damer - Sir John Leslie, 1st Baronet
- Lionel Seymour William Dawson-Damer, 4th Earl of Portarlington

Mary died in October 1848. Dawson-Damer survived her by eight years and died in April 1856, aged 67. He is buried in St Peter's Church, Winterborne Came, where there is a memorial to him. His only son Lionel succeeded to the title Earl of Portarlington on the death of his cousin Henry Dawson-Damer, 3rd Earl of Portarlington, in 1889.

Parliament of the United Kingdom
Preceded by Thomas Gladstone	Member of Parliament for Portarlington; 1835–1847	Succeeded by Francis Plunkett Dunne
Preceded by Henry Ashley; Sir James Graham, Bt	Member of Parliament for Dorchester; 1847–1852; With: Henry Sturt	Succeeded by Henry Sturt; Richard Brinsley Sheridan
Political offices
Preceded by Lord Marcus Hill	Comptroller of the Household; 1841–1846	Succeeded by Lord Marcus Hill
