= George Clavell =

English politician (1725–1774)

- Born: 1725
- Died: 1774
- Occupation: Politician

George Clavell (1725–1774), of Smedmore, in Kimmeridge, Dorset, was an English politician.

He was a Member (MP) of the Parliament of England for Dorchester 1752 to 1754.
