= Denis Bond (Parliamentarian politician) =

English politician

Denis Bond (died 1658) was an English politician who sat in the House of Commons in two periods between 1640 and 1656. He supported the Parliamentarian cause in the English Civil War and served as president of the Council of State during the Commonwealth.

Bond was the son of John Bond of Lutton (near Steeple, Dorset) and his wife Margaret Pitt. He was a prosperous woollen draper in Dorchester, bailiff in 1630 and Mayor of the town in 1635, and was one of the founders of the Dorchester Company, an early attempt to promote colonisation in New England.

In April 1640, Bond was elected Member of Parliament for Dorchester in the Short Parliament. He was re-elected MP for Dorchester for the Long Parliament in November 1640. When the Civil War broke out a couple of years later, he supported the Parliamentary cause and was a sufficiently hardline anti-Royalist to retain his seat in the Rump after Pride's Purge in 1648. He was an extremely active member, sitting on an extraordinary total of 263 committees.

Bond was initially named as one of the Commissioners to try the King, but avoided serving. Having become a friend of Oliver Cromwell, he was a member of the Council of State from 1649 to 1653, and was its president in 1652 and 1653. He also served as comptroller of the receipts of the Exchequer. Bond was elected MP for Weymouth and Melcombe Regis in 1654 for the First Protectorate Parliament and in 1656 for the Second Protectorate Parliament.

Bond died in 1658 and was buried in Westminster Abbey, but his body was exhumed after the Restoration.

Bond married Joan Gould (sister of one of his fellow investors in the Dorchester Company) in 1610. Their eldest son, John (1612–1676), was a Puritan preacher, who became Master of Trinity Hall, Cambridge and Professor of Law at Gresham College as well as MP for Weymouth. After his first wife's death Bond was married again, in 1622, to Lucy Lawrence; two of their sons, Samuel and Nathaniel (1634–1707), were also MPs.

Parliament of England
Vacant Parliament suspended since 1629	Member of Parliament for Dorchester; 1640–1653; With: Denzil Holles 1640–1648	Not represented in Barebones Parliament
Vacant Not represented in Barebones Parliament	Member of Parliament for Weymouth and Melcombe Regis; 1654–1656	Succeeded by John Trenchard; Walden Lagoe; John Clark; Peter Middleton
