= Beyond the Spectrum =

1964 novel by Martin Thomas

- First edition
- Author: Martin Thomas
- Cover artist: Sam Peffer
- Language: English
- Genre: Science fiction
- Publisher: Digit
- Publication date: 1964
- Publication place: United Kingdom
- Media type: Print (Hardcover)
- Pages: 157 pp
- OCLC: 20179829

Beyond the Spectrum is a science fiction novel by Martin Thomas (whose legal name was Thomas Hector Martin), published in 1964.

Beyond the Spectrum is set in the year 2956, the 30th century. It concerns an invasion of Earth by the inhabitants of the invisible planet Nihil. This planet is invisible due to an odd defect in the fabric of space between it and most of the other planets.

The first evidence of hostility happens as a young couple, Addis and Bia, are enjoying themselves; Addis gets knocked out by a stun ray gun and gets taken away into an invisible craft. Earth attempts to stop the invasion using a team of psychics, utilizing their psychic abilities to find the enemy, gather more intelligence on them and help the military capture an alien vessel and its crew.

It is discovered that the people of Nihil exist like an insect colony, mostly sterile, with drones that carry out the majority of work, and an intellectual class that runs the society and directs the war against Earth. Their emperor is noted to have an intellect superior that the people of the planet. Alida, a junior psychic, is abducted and taken to Nihil where she conducts an unorthodox method to try to undermine the enemy.
