= Henry Cravell =

14th-century English politician

Henry Cravell (died 1417), of Dorchester, Dorset, was an English politician.

== Family ==
He was married to a woman named Alice, and they had one daughter.

== Career ==
He was a member (MP) of the parliament of England for Dorchester in 1385 and 1386.
