= Robert Mose =

English politician

Robert Mose (fl. 1421–1427), of Dorchester, Dorset, was an English politician.

== Family ==
He married a woman named Joan, and they are thought to have had one son.

== Career ==
He was a Member (MP) of the Parliament of England for Dorchester in December 1421 and 1427.
