= Perne =

Perne is a surname. Notable people with the surname include:

- Andrew Perne (c. 1519–1589), Vice-Chancellor of Cambridge University and dean of Ely
- Andrew Perne (Puritan) (1596–1654), English clergyman of Puritan opinions
- Ralph Perne (fl. 1555), English politician

== See also ==
- Pernes (disambiguation)
- Pern
