= John Whiteway (politician) =

English wool merchant and politician

John Whiteway (1614 – c 1677) was an English wool merchant and politician who sat in the House of Commons at various times between 1654 and 1660.

Whiteway was the only surviving son of William Whiteway of Dorchester and his wife Mary Mounsell, daughter of John Mounsell, merchant of Weymouth, Dorset. His father was a wool merchant and had been MP for Dorchester. He was a captain of militia at Dorchester in 1643 and a commissioner for assessment for Dorset from 1643 to 1652. In 1645 he became mayor of Dorchester 1645. In 1646, he inherited two farms near Dorchester on the death of a nephew and became a J.P. for Dorset from 1647 to July 1660. In 1648, he was again commissioner for militia and in 1653 a commissioner for prisoners and piracy. He was a commissioner for scandalous ministers in 1654.

In 1654, Whiteway was elected Member of Parliament for Dorchester in the First Protectorate Parliament. He was re-elected MP for Dorchester in 1656 for the Second Protectorate Parliament. He was commissioner for assessment for Dorset in 1657 and became mayor of Dorchester in 1658. In 1659, he was commissioner for militia again and from January 1660 he was commissioner for assessment for Dorset until 1661. In March 1660, he was commissioner for militia again and in April 1660 was re-elected MP for Dorchester in the Convention Parliament.

Whiteway's will was proved in February 1679 by a creditor.

Whiteway first married Mary White, daughter of Stephen White of Stanton St. John, Oxfordshire on 28 Feb 1639. They had four sons and two daughters. Mary died in 1658. He married secondly Martha, widow of Francis Sedgwicke and of Timothy Alsop, brewer of Hackney, Middlesex and daughter of Ralph Triplett, brewer of Thames Street, London on 9 July 1667.

Parliament of England
Preceded by Not represented in Barebones Parliament	Member of Parliament for Dorchester; 1654–1656	Succeeded by James Gould; John Bushrode
