= William Tylle =

English politician

William Tylle (fl. 1390) was an English politician.

He was a Member (MP) of the Parliament of England for Dorchester in January 1390. Beyond this, nothing is known of him.
