= John Davy (MP) =

16th-century English politician

John Davy (by 1514 – 1560 or later), of Dorchester, Dorset, was an English politician.

He married a woman named Elizabeth.

He was a Member (MP) of the Parliament of England for Dorchester in November 1554.
