= Chettle House =

Grade I listed building in Dorset, England

Coordinates: 50°55′05″N 2°04′14″W

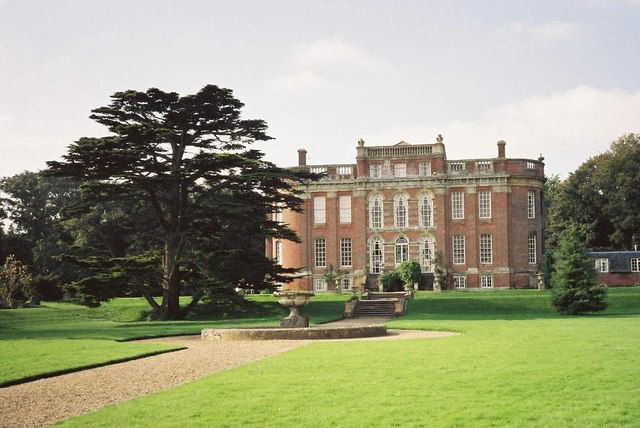
Chettle House, 2001

Chettle House is a Grade I listed country manor house with Queen Anne style architecture in Chettle, North Dorset, England, about 6 miles (10 km) northeast of the town of Blandford Forum. It was built in 1710 for George Chafin, to designs of the architect Thomas Archer. The builders were William and Francis Smith from Warwick.

The property was bought by the banker William Castleman in 1846, who together with his solicitor son Charles Castleman built the first railway into Dorset in 1845–47 (the Southampton and Dorchester Railway, which was known as "Castleman's Corkscrew" because of its convoluted route). By that time the house "was a ruin used for storing grain, sans floors, ceilings or fireplaces", according to a 2019 report. During the renovations, the family modified some of the interior layout; that included lowering the north and south wings.

Pevsner called it "the plum among Dorset houses of the early 18th century, and even nationally outstanding as a specimen of English Baroque".

In 1946, the property was inherited by Esther Bourke who eventually converted it into a series of flats. As of 2010, the property was still owned by the Bourke family, who were also long-time owners of the entire community in a form of "benevolent feudalism".

In May 2015, the manor was listed for sale at a guide price of £3.95m, and soon sold, "reputedly for more than 50% above the guide price", and was described by Country Life as "arguably, the country-house sale of 2015". The article described the property as "the magnificent, 14,580sq ft mansion, set in 117 acres of gardens, grounds, parkland and woodland, needed substantial renovation". The new owners planned to restore the house into a single family private home.

As of late 2020, the owners were Tom and Rosamond Sweet-Escott, who received a Georgian Group award the previous year for the restoration they had completed, with the guidance of Hugh Petter of Adam Architecture. A November 2020 article in Country Life highlighted the results of the work and documented them with photographs.
