= Richard Berell =

English politician

Richard Berell (fl. 1414), of Dorset, was an English politician.

He was the son of Walter and Agnes Berell, of Dorchester.

He was a Member (MP) of the Parliament of England for the constituency of Dorchester in November 1414.
