= John Hayward (MP for Dorchester) =

16th-century English politician

John Hayward (born before 1530 – died by 1572), of Dorchester, Dorset, was an English politician.

He was a member (MP) of the Parliament of England for Dorchester in 1558.
