= Napier baronets of Punknoll (1682) =

Escutcheon of the Napier baronets of Punknoll

The Napier Baronetcy, of Punknoll in the County of Dorset, was created in the Baronetage of England on 25 February 1682 for Robert Napier, a nephew of Sir Gerrard Napier, 1st Baronet of Middle Marsh. The title probably became extinct on the death of the 2nd Baronet in 1743: Cokayne says "nothing authentic is known".

== Napier baronets, of Punknoll (1682) ==
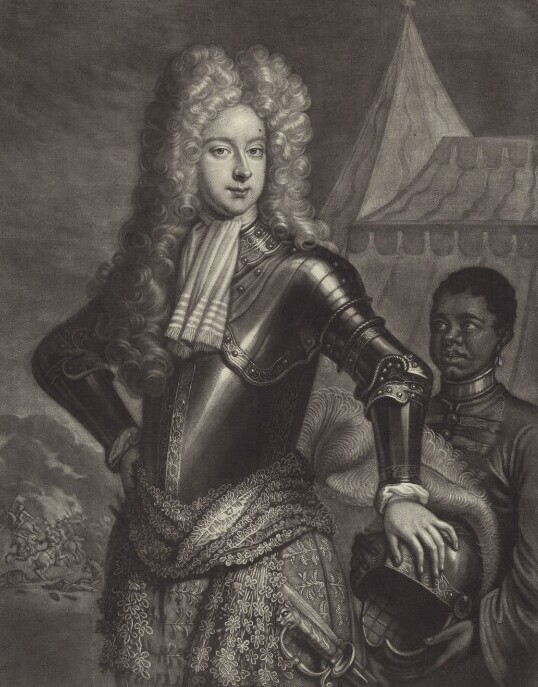
Detail of an engrvaing of Sir Charles Napier, 2nd Baronet and a Black attendant

- Sir Robert Napier, 1st Baronet (c. 1640–1700)
- Sir Charles Napier, 2nd Baronet (c. 1673–1743)
