= William Pullare =

English politician

William Pullare (died 1412), of Dorchester, Dorset, was an English politician.

He married a woman named Emmotta. He was a Member (MP) of the Parliament of England for Dorchester in 1394.
