= William Adyn =

16th-century English politician

William Adyn (died by 1605), of Dorchester and Bingham's Manor, West Stafford, Dorset, was an English politician and draper.

== Career ==
Adyn was the second son of John Adyn, a bailiff of Dorchester, and his wife Edith Barbet. He married Mary, daughter of Robert Reve of Blandford. He was a burgess of Dorchester in 1560, a bailiff in 1564–1565, a receiver of rents in 1573–1579 and a trustee of Dorchester school in 1579. "In 1591 he was involved in a Star Chamber case relating to the manors of Frome Billet and West Stafford, being accused of riot and suppression of the truth at the assizes." After he acted against the Dorchester authorities in 1585, an action was brought against him in the Star Chamber by Matthew Chubbe. He was a Member (MP) of the Parliament of England for Dorchester in 1571.
