= Peter Blount (MP) =

English politician

Peter Blount (died c. 1405), from Dorchester, Dorset, was an English politician.

== Family ==
His first wife was named Juliana; his second wife was Isabel. He was the older brother of John Blount, who was also an MP.

== Career ==
He was a member (MP) of the Parliament of England for Dorchester in February 1383, October 1383, April 1384, 1385 and 1386.
