= Samuel Bond (MP) =

English academic, lawyer and politician

Samuel Bond (died 1673) was an English academic, lawyer and politician who sat in the House of Commons in 1659.

Bond was the son of Denis Bond of Dorset who was a Parliamentarian MP and his second wife Lucy Lawrence. He matriculated from St Catharine's College, Cambridge at Michaelmas 1639 and was awarded BA in 1642. He was admitted at Inner Temple in 1642. In 1646 he was awarded MA at Cambridge and became a Fellow of Trinity Hall, Cambridge until 1649. He was called to the bar in 1648.

In 1659, Bond was elected Member of Parliament for Poole in the Third Protectorate Parliament. He was elected MP for Weymouth and Melcombe Regis in 1660 for the Convention Parliament but was involved in a double return and his election was declared void on 5 May 1660. He became Recorder of Weymouth and Melcombe Regis.

Bond died in 1673 and was buried at Dorchester on 31 May. He was the brother of Nathaniel Bond and half-brother of John Bond.

Parliament of England
Preceded by Edward Boteler	Member of Parliament for Poole; 1659; With: Colonel John Fitzjames	Succeeded by John Pyne
