= Richard Brinsley Sheridan (politician) =

English politician

The Right Honourable Richard Brinsley Sheridan DL

Member of Parliament for Dorchester
- In office 1852–1868 Serving with George Dawson-Damer, Charles Napier Sturt
- Preceded by: George Dawson-Damer; Henry Sturt
- Succeeded by: Charles Napier Sturt

Member of Parliament for Shaftesbury
- In office 1845–1852
- Preceded by: Lord Howard of Effingham
- Succeeded by: Henry Berkeley Portman

Personal details
- Born: 26 May 1806; London, England
- Died: 2 May 1888 (aged 81–82)
- Political party: Whig
- Spouse: Marcia Maria Grant (after 1835)
- Relations: Richard Brinsley Sheridan (grandfather); Sir James Campbell
- Children: 9
- Parent(s): Thomas Sheridan; Caroline Henrietta Callander

Richard Brinsley Sheridan (bapt. 26 May 1806 – 2 May 1888) was an English Whig politician.

== Early life ==
He was born in London, the eldest son of Thomas Sheridan, colonial treasurer in the Cape of Good Hope, and the novelist Caroline Henrietta Callander of Craig forth and the grandson of his namesake, the playwright Richard Brinsley Sheridan. His maternal grandfather was Sir James Campbell. After his father died in 1817, his mother moved to London with her seven children.

== Career ==
He served as High Sheriff of Dorset in 1838. He was Member of Parliament (MP) for Shaftesbury from 1845 to 1852 and for Dorchester from 1852 until he retired in 1868 and also Deputy Lieutenant for Dorset. He was a Liberal in favour of extending the right to vote.

== Personal life ==
He eloped with and subsequently married Marcia Maria Grant, the daughter of Gen. Sir John Colquhoun Grant on 18 May 1835. Together, they were the parents of three daughters and six sons:

- Edith Marcia Caroline Sheridan (1836–1876), who married Francis John Thynne, son of Lord John Thynne.
- Richard Brinsley Sheridan (1838–1868), who died unmarried.
- Francis John Rogers Sheridan (1842–1877), who died unmarried.
- Helena Charlotte Sheridan (1845–1893), who died unmarried.
- Algernon Thomas Brinsley Sheridan (1845–1931), who married Mary Lothrop Motley, daughter of John Lothrop Motley.
- Charles William Frederick Sheridan (1847–1896), who died unmarried.
- Thomas Constantine Henry Kier Sheridan (1851–1931), who died unmarried.
- James Colquhoun Grant Sheridan (1857–1865), who died young.
- Florence Sarah Wilhelmine Sheridan (d. 1909), who married Augustus Bampfylde, 2nd Baron Poltimore.

Sheridan died on 2 May 1888.

Parliament of the United Kingdom
Preceded by Lord Howard of Effingham	Member of Parliament for Shaftesbury; 1845 – 1852	Succeeded by Henry Berkeley Portman
Preceded by George Dawson-Damer; Henry Sturt	Member of Parliament for Dorchester; 1852 – 1868; With: George Dawson-Damer to 1856; Charles Napier Sturt from 1856	Succeeded by Charles Napier Sturt
