= John Bomel =

English politician

John Bomel (fl. 1402), of Dorchester, Dorset, was an English politician.

Nothing is recorded of Bomel's family or early life.

He was a Member (MP) of the Parliament of England for Dorchester in 1402.
