= Thomas Martin (politician, died 1583) =

British politician (c. 1530 – 1583)

Thomas Martin (c. 1530 – 1583), of Park Pale, Tolpuddle, Dorset, was an English politician.

There remain questions over Martin's identity. There have been suggestions that he was the lawyer and MP from the area, Thomas Martin, who represented other constituencies. It is now thought he was from a different Martin family in the area. He married Elizabeth Gerard and they had at least five sons and three daughters. He was a Member (MP) of the Parliament of England for Dorchester in 1563.
