= Richard Wright (MP) =

English politician

Richard Wright (c. 1568–1639), MP of Sherborne, Dorset, was a Member (MP) of the Parliament of England for Dorchester in 1597 and for Queenborough.

== Family ==
Richard Wright was the eldest son of Robert Wright of Sturminster Newton, Dorset. He was educated at Sherborne, Magdalen College, Oxford and New College, Oxford.

He was a Member (MP) of the Parliament of England for Dorchester in 1597 and for Queenborough in 1604. He was Mayor of Lyme Regis in 1617–18.
