= Christopher Hole =

16th-century English politician

Christopher Hole (by 1511–1570) was an English politician.

== Life ==
Hole was born in Devon by 1511. By 1548, he had married Dorothy, a widow from London. They had one daughter. He inherited a messuage and some land in South Tawton, Devon, which he sold by 1523. He bought more property in the area.

== Career ==
Hole was a lawyer, mainly based in Dorset. He was a member of parliament for Dorchester in 1545, 1547, 1554 and 1558, during the reigns of Henry VIII, Edward VI, Mary I and Elizabeth I.

== Death ==
He lived his property around South Tawton to his nephew, George Robinson, and the rest to his daughter Margaret and her husband, Stephen Brent, who were his executors.
