= Martin Thomas =

Martin Thomas may refer to:

- Martin Thomas, Baron Thomas of Gresford (born 1937), British Liberal Democrat politician
- Martin Thomas (cricketer) (born 1952), former English cricketer
- Martin Thomas (footballer, born 1959), Welsh football player and goalkeeping coach
- Martin Thomas (historian) (born 1964), British historian
- Martin Thomas (footballer, born 1973), English football player
- Martin Thomas (canoeist) (born 1989), French slalom canoeist

== See also ==
- Martyn Thomas (born 1948), British software engineer
- Martyn Thomas (rugby player) (born 1987), Welsh rugby union player
- Thomas Martin (disambiguation)
