= Robert Gutton =

English politician

Robert Gutton (fl. 1384–1397), of Dorchester, Dorset, was an English politician.

He married Alice Rede. He was a Member (MP) of the Parliament of England for Dorchester in November 1384, 1393 and September 1397.
