= Stuart Hole =

English cricketer

Personal information
- Full name: Stuart Mark Hole
- Born: 17 July 1985 (age 41); Oxford, Oxfordshire, England
- Batting: Right-handed
- Bowling: Right-arm medium

Domestic team information
- Years: Team
- 2007-2008: Warwickshire
- 2005-present: Oxfordshire

Career statistics
| Competition | FC | LA |
|---|---|---|
| Matches | 2 | 2 |
| Runs scored | 24 | – |
| Batting average | 24.00 | – |
| 100s/50s | –/– | –/– |
| Top score | 24.00 | – |
| Balls bowled | 198 | 18 |
| Wickets | 2 | 1 |
| Bowling average | 52.50 | 16.00 |
| 5 wickets in innings | – | – |
| 10 wickets in match | – | – |
| Best bowling | 2/40 | 1/16 |
| Catches/stumpings | –/– | –/– |
- Source: Cricinfo, 26 September 2010

Stuart Mark Hole (born 17 July 1985) is an English former cricketer. Hole is a right-handed batsman who bowls right-arm medium pace. He was born at Oxford, Oxfordshire.

Hole played 2 first-class matches for Warwickshire. His first-class debut came against Yorkshire in the 2007 County Championship. His second and final first-class match came against Cambridge University in 2008. In his 2 first-class matches, he scored 24 runs at a batting average of 24 and a high score of 24. With the ball he took 2 wickets at a bowling average of 52.52, with best figures of 2/29. He also played 2 List-A matches for Warwickshire against Essex and Sussex in the 2007 Friends Provident Trophy. In his 2 List-A matches, he wasn't required to bat and with the ball took a single wicket at a cost of 16 runs. He was released by Warwickshire at the end of the 2008 season.

Hole has also represented Oxfordshire in the Minor Counties Championship, making his debut for the county in that competition in 2005 against Devon. From 2005 to present, he has represented the county in 11 Championship matches. Hole has also represented Oxfordshire in the MCCA Knockout Trophy, with his debut in that competition coming against Cumberland in 2005. From 2005 to present, he has represented the county in 9 Trophy matches.

Hole also played football during his career as a defender. He made one appearance for Wycombe Wanderers in the Football League in 2003–04, a 1–1 draw against Peterborough United on 8 May 2004. Later in his career he played for North Leigh in the Southern Football League.
