= Edward Meller =

English politician

Edward Meller (c. 1647 – buried 1699), of Little Bredy, Dorset, was an English politician.

== Family ==
He was the maternal grandson of MP, Owen Jennens.

== Career ==
He was a Member (MP) of the Parliament of England for Dorchester in 1685.
