= George Horsey (landowner) =

English landowner and MP

Sir George Horsey (c.1588 – buried 10 January 1645) of Clifton Maybank, Dorset was an English landowner engaged in ambitious industrial and land reclamation schemes.

He was the 2nd son of Sir Ralph Horsey and Edith Mohun of Clifton Maybank and was educated at Sherborne School and Trinity College, Oxford. In 1612, after his father's death, he inherited the family estates, which lay in Somerset and Dorset.

He married Elizabeth Freke who predeceased him in 1638. They had four sons including one who died fighting for Parliament in the English Civil War.

He was a Member (MP) of the Parliament of England for Dorchester in 1614, for Poole in 1621 and for Dorset in 1624. He was knighted in 1619.

He invested in a scheme with Dud Dudley to smelt iron using coal, which along with other decisions led to the end of the family estate. In 1638, he was imprisoned in Newgate. In 1640, he was again imprisoned, for debt in Dorchester. He probably died in Fleet Prison, having lost his family's entire estate and assets.
