= Richard Hyde (MP for Dorchester) =

English politician

Richard Hyde (fl. 1406) was an English politician.

He was a Member (MP) of the Parliament of England for Dorchester in 1406. Nothing else is recorded of him.
