= William Newton (MP for Dorchester) =

English politician

William Newton (died 1453), of Swell, Somerset, was an English politician.

Newton married twice. His first wife, Maud, died on 24 February 1419; she was the widow of Sir John Lorty. By 1429, Newton had married again, to Idonea née Montague. With Idonea he had one son.

He was a member (MP) of the Parliament of England for Dorchester in May 1413.
