= John Jordan (died c. 1422) =

English politician

John Jordan (died c. 1422) was an English politician.

He was a Member (MP) of the Parliament of England for Dorchester from 1397 to 1414.
