= Thomas Lamer =

English politician

Thomas Lamer (died 1397/98), of Dorchester (Dorset) and London was an English politician.

== Career ==
He married a woman named Christine and they had one son and one daughter.

== Career ==
He was a member (MP) of the parliament of England for Dorchester in February 1383, April 1384, November 1384, February 1388 and 1391.
