= Bill Newton (footballer) =

Australian rules footballer

Personal information
- Full name: William Thomas Newton
- Born: 8 February 1875; Prahran, Victoria
- Died: 6 April 1941 (aged 66); Bairnsdale, Victoria

Playing career^{1}
Years	Club	Games (Goals)
1897	St Kilda	3 (0)
- ^{1} Playing statistics correct to the end of 1897.

William Thomas Newton (8 February 1875 – 6 April 1941) was an Australian rules footballer who played with St Kilda in the Victorian Football League (VFL).

== Football ==
Cleared from Richmond (VFA) to St. Klda (VFA) in May 1896, he played in St Kilda's first three VFL competition matches in 1897.

== Family ==
The son of James Newton, and Harriett Ann Newton, née Oakley, William Thomas Newton was born at Prahran on 8 February 1875. He married Ellen Williams in 1900. He died at Bairnsdale, Victoria on 6 April 1941.
