= William Holman (MP for Dorchester) =

16th-century English politician

William Holman (by 1524 – 1559/1569), of Dorchester and Berwick, Dorset, was an English politician.

He was a member (MP) of the Parliament of England for Dorchester in October 1553 and 1559.
