= Lammers =

Lammers is a Dutch and Low German patronymic surname meaning "son of Lammert" (Lambert). It may refer to the following notable people:

- Annelotte Lammers, Dutch politician
- Esmé Lammers (born 1958), Dutch author and film director
- Frank Lammers (born 1972), Dutch television and film actor
- Georg Lammers (1905–1987), German sprinter
- Gustav Adolf Lammers Heiberg (1875–1948), Norwegian barrister and politician for the Labour Party
- Hans Lammers (1879–1962), German jurist and prominent Nazi politician
- Jan Lammers (1926–2011), Dutch sprinter
- Jan Lammers, (born 1956), Dutch racing driver and team principal
- John Lammers (ice hockey) (born 1986), Canadian ice hockey player
- John Lammers (born 1963), Dutch footballer
- Kim Lammers (born 1981), Dutch field hockey player
- Lothar Lammers (1926–2012), German inventor of the six-number lottery game
- Marc Lammers (born 1969), Dutch women's national field hockey team head coach
- Sam Lammers (born 1997), Dutch footballer
- Thorvald Lammers (1841–1922), Norwegian baritone singer, conductor, composer and biographer

== See also ==
- Albert Lammers House, house in Stillwater, Minnesota on the National Register of Historic Places
- Lammers Glacier, large glacier on the east coast of Graham Land
- Lammers Township, Beltrami County, Minnesota, township in Beltrami County, Minnesota, United States
