= Nihilist (disambiguation) =

A nihilist is person who subscribes to nihilism, the belief that existence has no objective meaning, purpose, or intrinsic value.

Nihilist may also refer to:

- Nihilist movement, a cultural and philosophical movement in Russia from the late 19th century
- The Nihilist (film), a 1905 film by Wallace McCutcheon, Sr.
- Nihilist (band), a Swedish death metal band
- The Nihilist (album), a 2014 album by Liam Finn
- Nihilist, a 1996 album by Sarin, a band fronted by Stephen O'Malley
- Nihilist Records, an American record label
- nStigate Games, formerly named Nihilistic Software, a defunct video game development studio
- ”Nihilist”, a song by MUNA for the Promising Young Woman soundtrack
