= Ralph Perne =

16th-century English politician

Ralph Perne (fl. 1555) was an English politician.

He was a Member (MP) of the Parliament of England for Dorchester in 1555. There is no further record of a Ralph Perne, but he may be the glover, Ralph Peryn, who was a bailiff and constable in Dorchester.
