= Nathaniel Gundry =

English lawyer and politician

Sir Nathaniel Gundry (1701?–1754), was an English lawyer and politician.

Gundry was born at Lyme Regis, and entered as a member of the Middle Temple in 1720. In 1725 he was called to the bar, and migrated to Lincoln's Inn. At the dissolution in 1741 he was returned to parliament for the borough of Dorchester, and was re-elected in 1747. He took his place among the opponents of Sir Robert Walpole, and on their triumph he was made a king's counsel, when Sir Charles Hanbury Williams wrote: 'That his Majesty might not want good and able counsellors learned in the law, lo ! Murray the orator and Nathaniel Gundry were appointed King's counsel'.

His practice justified his being regarded as a candidate for the office of solicitor-general, but he was passed by, possibly because, as the satirists alleged, his manners were stiff and pretentious. On the death of Sir Thomas Abney in 1750 Gundry was appointed a judge of the common pleas. After he had been on the bench four years he, like Abney, was carried off by gaol fever, while on circuit at Launceston, Cornwall, on 23 March 1754, aged 53. He was buried at Musbury, near Axminster, and a tablet to his memory was placed against the western side of the south aisle of the parish church. A leasehold interest in the farm of Uddens in Chalbury, Dorsetshire, was acquired by him, and he built on the property a mansion which passed to his son Nathaniel, but he resided at Maidenhayne in Musbury, which he held on lease from Lady Drake. His widow, Mary Kelloway, died at Richmond, Surrey, on 9 November 1791, aged 73.
