= Chettle =

Village in Dorset, England

Coordinates: 50.9203°N 2.0692°W

- Chettle parish church

- Location within Dorset
- Population: 90
- OS grid reference: ST952134
- Civil parish: Chettle
- Unitary authority: Dorset
- Ceremonial county: Dorset
- Region: South West
- Country: England
- Sovereign state: United Kingdom
- Post town: BLANDFORD FORUM
- Postcode district: DT11
- Dialling code: 01258
- Police: Dorset
- Fire: Dorset and Wiltshire
- Ambulance: South Western
- UK Parliament: North Dorset

Chettle is a small village and civil parish in the county of Dorset in southern England. It lies 6 miles (10 kilometres) northeast of Blandford Forum. It is sited at the head of a gently sloping valley on the dip slope of the chalk formation called Cranborne Chase. The A354 trunk road crosses the valley about 1 km to the south. In 2013 the estimated population of the civil parish was 90.

A 2008 report indicated that the entire village was owned by the Bourke family and operated in the mode of "benevolent feudalism". A news item from 2015 confirmed the ownership and provided the following update about the community:

The tiny hamlet, with its hotel, manor house, 40 cottages, farms and lumber yard has belonged to the Bourke family for more than 400 years, in a benign throwback to feudal times.

Chettle House, the village manor, is a red brick Baroque mansion designed by Thomas Archer, a pupil of Vanbrugh, and built by the Bastard brothers of Blandford Forum during the reign of Queen Anne. Pevsner called it "the plum among Dorset houses of the early 18th century, and even nationally outstanding as a specimen of English Baroque". Two rounded ends were added to the house in 1912.

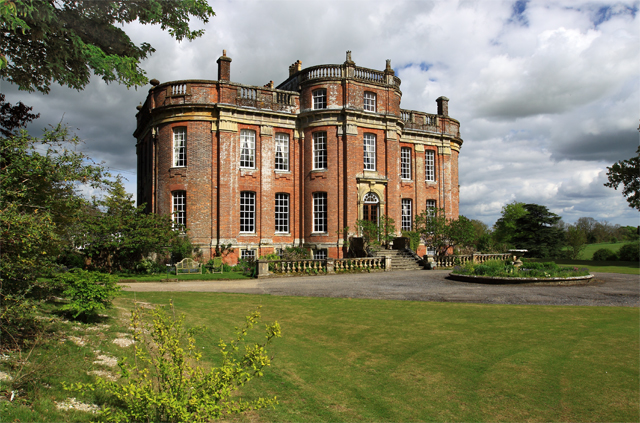
Chettle House, 2009

From the 1950s to 2015 the house was a series of flats. After 2015, extensive renovations were completed by new owners; the house and gardens were closed to the public.

A book about Chettle, "Enduring Village", was published in August, 2008.
