= Thomas Chafin (1650–1691) =

English politician

Thomas Chafin (1650–1691), of Chettle, Dorset, was an English politician who sat in the House of Commons between 1679 and 1691.

Chafin commanded a troop of horse against the Duke of Monmouth at the Battle of Sedgemoor in 1685. He was a Member of Parliament (MP) for Poole in March 1679, October 1679, 1681 and 1685 and for Dorchester in 1689 and for Hindon in 1690 and 1691.

Chafin died in 1691 and was succeeded by his eldest son Thomas.
