= George Damer =

English politician

George Damer (1727–1752), of Winterborne Came, Dorset, was an English politician.

He was a Member (MP) of the Parliament of Great Britain for Dorchester 1751 to 1752.
