= James Gould (died 1676) =

English politician

James Gould (1593–1676) was an English politician who sat in the House of Commons at various times between 1659 and 1676.

Gould was the second son of John Gould of Dorchester and his wife Joan Benvenewe, daughter of John Benvenewe of Abbotsbury and widow of John Roy of Weymouth. He was baptised on 21 July 1593. His father was a merchant in Dorchester, and Gould inherited the family business in 1630. He was Mayor of Dorchester from 1637 to 1638. He was strongly opposed to ship-money. In 1643, he advanced £300 for the parliamentary cause. In January 1649 he claimed to have been ousted from the administration of a charitable trust "for his loyalty". In 1652 he was commissioner for assessment for Dorset 1652 and he was High Sheriff of Dorset for 1655–56.

In 1659, Gould was elected Member of Parliament for Dorchester in the Third Protectorate Parliament. In the election of 1660, he was narrowly defeated by John Whiteway. He signed the loyal address to the King presented from Dorset. In 1661 he was elected MP for Dorchester again for the Cavalier Parliament. He was not an active member although he was involved with legislation relating to the wool trade. He was a senior alderman from 1661 until his death and a commissioner for assessment for Dorset from 1661 to 1669. In 1675 he was a commissioner recusants.

Gould died at the age of 82 and was buried at Holy Trinity, Dorchester on 15 February 1676.

Gould married Margery Savage, daughter of George Savage of Bloxworth on 28 April 1624 and had six sons and two daughters. His son James succeeded him as MP for Dorchester.

Parliament of England
Preceded by John Whiteway	Member of Parliament for Dorchester; 1659; With: John Bushrode	Succeeded by Not represented in Restored Rump
Preceded by Denzil Holles; John Whiteway	Member of Parliament for Dorchester; 1661–1677; With: Denzil Holles 1661; John Churchill 1661–1677	Succeeded by John Churchill; James Gould
