= William Churchill (Dorchester MP) =

English politician

William Churchill (1627–1702), of Colliton House, Dorchester and Muston Manor, Piddlehinton, Dorset, was an English politician.

He married Grace Meller, the daughter of MP, John Meller.

He was a Member (MP) of the Parliament of England for Dorchester in 1685.
