= Thomas Trenchard (1672–1703) =

English politician

Thomas Trenchard (1672–1703), of Wolveton, Charminster, Dorset, was an English politician.

He was a Member (MP) of the Parliament of England for Dorchester in 1689, 17 December 1690 and February 1701. He represented Wareham in 1695 and 1698, and Dorset in December 1701.
