= Sir Nathaniel Napier, 2nd Baronet =

English politician

Sir Nathaniel Napier, 2nd Baronet (1636–1709) was an English politician, known also as a traveller and dilettante.

== Early life ==
The third son of Sir Gerrard Napier, 1st Baronet, of More Crichel in Dorset, by Margaret, daughter and co-heiress of John Colles of Barton St David, Somerset, he matriculated at Oriel College, Oxford, 16 March 1654, as a fellow-commoner.

He presented the college with a bronze eagle lectern; but, being in bad health, did not take a degree. After his marriage in 1656, he lived quietly at Edmondsham, Dorset.

== In politics ==
Napier was knighted on 16 January 1662, and spent some time travelling. In 1673 he succeeded his father as second baronet, and settled down as a country gentleman. He renovated Middlemarsh Hall and Crichel House, and represented Dorset in the House of Commons from April 1677 to February 1678, before he was unseated.

Napier sat as member for Corfe Castle in the two parliaments of 1679, and in those of 1681 and 1685–87. In 1689, he took his seat in the Convention parliament as member for Poole, for which town he had procured the restoration in 1688 of the charter forfeited in 1687; but a double return had been made for the second seat for that borough, and a committee of the House of Commons reported, 9 February 1689, that Thomas Chafin, who had a majority of the votes of the commonalty paying scot and lot, was entitled to the seat. The House, however, decided that the franchise should be confined to the "select body", i.e. the mayor, aldermen, and burgesses, who had voted for Napier by a majority of 33 to 22.

Napier continued to represent Poole till 1698. He later sat for Dorchester from February 1702 until 1705. His party affiliations in mid-life were unclear to contemporaries, but at the end he was an outright Tory.

== Later life ==
In 1697, Napier began to travel again, with a tour in France and Italy, keeping a journal. In France, he kept company with the deposed James II of England and his son, the future Old Pretender.

In October 1701, Napier revisited Holland, and, in 1704, spent three months in Rotterdam, intending to go on to Hanover.

From March 1706 to September 1707, Napier was at Spa for his health; and eventually died in England on 21 January 1709. He was buried with his ancestors at Great Minterne, Dorset, where he had erected a monument during his lifetime. A mural inscription was added by his son.

== Works ==
In 1667 Napier went for three months to Holland with his mother's brother-in-law, Henry Coventry, a diplomat sent to negotiate the Treaty of Breda. On his return, he wrote a Particular Tract describing his travels. In 1671–2 he paid a visit to France, and wrote another Tract. He had a reputation for drawing.

== Family ==
In 1656 Napier's father married him to Blanche, daughter and coheiress of Sir Hugh Wyndham, justice of the Common Pleas and his first wife Jane Wodehouse. Lady Napier died in 1695, and, their first four sons having also died before 1690, Sir Nathaniel married a Gloucestershire lady, Susanna Guise, in 1697. A daughter, Elizabeth, married Sir John Guise, 3rd Baronet of the same family.

Napier was succeeded by his only surviving son, Nathaniel, who was member for Dorchester in nine parliaments between 1695 and 1722. On the death of his grandson, the sixth baronet, in 1765, the estates passed to a cousin, Humphry Sturt, who built up Crichel House there.

== Notes ==
Baronetage of England
Preceded by Gerrard Napier	Baronet (of Middle Marsh); 1673–1709	Succeeded by Nathaniel Napier

Attribution

This article incorporates text from a publication now in the public domain: Lee, Sidney, ed. (1894). "Napier, Nathaniel". Dictionary of National Biography. Vol. 40. London: Smith, Elder & Co.
