= Nicholas Gould =

English politician

Nicholas Gould (1635–1691), of Lime Street, London and Upwey, Dorset, was an English politician.

== Family ==
He had two sons and three daughters.

== Career ==
He was Mayor of Dorchester from 1680 to 1681. He was a Member (MP) of the Parliament of England for Dorchester in March and October 1679 and for Weymouth and Melcombe Regis from 1690 to 1691.
