= Benjamin Gifford (MP) =

English politician

Benjamin Gifford (c. 1688–1713), of Beaminster, Dorset, and Boreham, near Warminster, Wiltshire, was an English Member of Parliament (MP).

He was a Member of the Parliament of England for Dorchester from 1710 to June 1713.
