= James Gould (died 1707) =

English politician

James Gould (c. 1625–1707) of Dorchester, Dorset was an English politician who sat in the House of Commons at various times between 1677 and 1695.

Gould was the son of James Gould of Dorchester and his wife Margery Savage, daughter of George Savage of Bloxworth His father was a wealthy woollen merchant in Dorchester and MP for the town. At the Restoration Gould signed the loyal address from Dorset.

In 1677, after the death of his father, Gould was returned unopposed as Member of Parliament for Dorchester in the Cavalier Parliament. He was not an active member and only became involved in wool legislation. He also succeeded his father as alderman. He was Mayor of Dorchester from 1677 to 1678 and commissioner for assessment for Dorset from 1677 to 1689.

In 1679, he stood down from his parliamentary seat in favour of his cousin Nicholas Gould, but was again elected MP for Dorchester in 1680 after Sir Francis Holles succeeded to the peerage. Gould was re-elected MP for Dorchester in 1681. He was sheriff of Dorset for 1687-8 and a J.P. from May 1688 to 1689. He was proposed as a court candidate at Poole in 1688 but failed to win a seat. In 1689 he was commissioner for assessment for Dorset and in the same year became freeman of Poole. He was re-elected MP for Dorchester in 1690 and held the seat until 1695. He was Commissioner for drowned lands in 1690 and was Mayor of Dorchester again from 1696 to 1697. He became a JP again in 1700.

Gould was buried at St Peter's, Dorchester, on 11 August 1707.

Gould married Mary Baskett, widow of John Baskett of Dewlish and daughter of William Bond of South Bestwall before 2 July 1678. Their only child, a daughter Mary married firstly Charles Churchill and secondly Montagu Venables-Bertie, 2nd Earl of Abingdon.
