= Joseph Damer (1676–1737) =

English politician

Joseph Damer (1676–1737), of Dorchester, Dorset, was an English politician.

He was a Member of Parliament (MP) for Dorchester 1722 to 1727.
