= Richard Bushrode =

English haberdasher, merchant adventurer and politician

Richard Bushrode, also Bushrod (1576 – 1 July 1628) was an English haberdasher and merchant adventurer and a politician who sat in the House of Commons in 1624 and 1626.

== Early life ==
Bushrode was the son of John Bushrode, husbandman of Sherborne, Dorset and his wife Margery Feltons. He was baptised on 3 February 1576 in Sherborne.

== Work with the Dorchester Company ==
Bushrod became a haberdasher at Dorchester and was also a merchant adventurer carrying on a trade in fishing for cod and bartering furs from New England which he sold in England and France. He was a parishioner of Rev. John White who was influential in colonising New England and he was a strong supporter of the puritan movement. He was persuaded by White that a colony could be established from the men employed to double man his ships for fishing purposes and they formed a plan to leave them on the coast to grow crops and live off the land so they could rejoin the fishing fleet next season. White thought this could become a larger colony and a refuge for those suffering religious persecution. Bushrod and White formed the Dorchester Company together with other friends and traders. Bushrod acted as the company's representative in applying for a patent to settle a plantation in New England which was granted by the Council for New England on 18 February 1623.

== Later life ==
Bushrode became a man of substance in Dorchester owning properties in various parts of Dorset. In 1624, he was elected Member of Parliament for Dorchester. He was re-elected MP for Dorchester in 1626. The Dorchester Company failed in 1626 as did some of Bushrode's other business ventures, but he, White and others persisted in setting up the foundations for the New England Company. Bushrode died in 1628 at the age of 52.

== Family ==
Bushrode married Dorthy Watts. His son John was later MP for Dorchester.

Parliament of England
Preceded by Sir Francis Ashley; John Parkins	Member of Parliament for Dorchester; 1624; With: William Whiteway	Succeeded by Sir Francis Ashley; William Whiteway
Preceded by Sir Francis Ashley; William Whiteway	Member of Parliament for Dorchester; 1626; With: Michael Humphreys; William Whiteway	Succeeded by Denzil Holles; John Hill
