= Denzil Holles, 3rd Baron Holles =

English noble

Denzil Holles, 3rd Baron Holles (1675 – c. 1692) was an English noble, son of Francis Holles, 2nd Baron Holles, and grandson of Denzil Holles, 1st Baron Holles (best known as one of the five members of parliament whom King Charles I of England attempted to arrest in 1642).

Denzil was the final Baron Holles, at which time the estates devolved on a cousin, John Holles (1662–1711), 4th Earl of Clare and Duke of Newcastle.

Peerage of England
| Preceded by Francis Holles | Baron Holles; 1690–1692 | Extinct |
