= Eleven Members =

The Eleven Members were members of the House of Commons of England, who were identified by commanders of the New Model Army as their principal opponents. They were suspended and forced into exile for six months; after the 1648 Second English Civil War, many were permanently removed in December 1648.

== Background ==
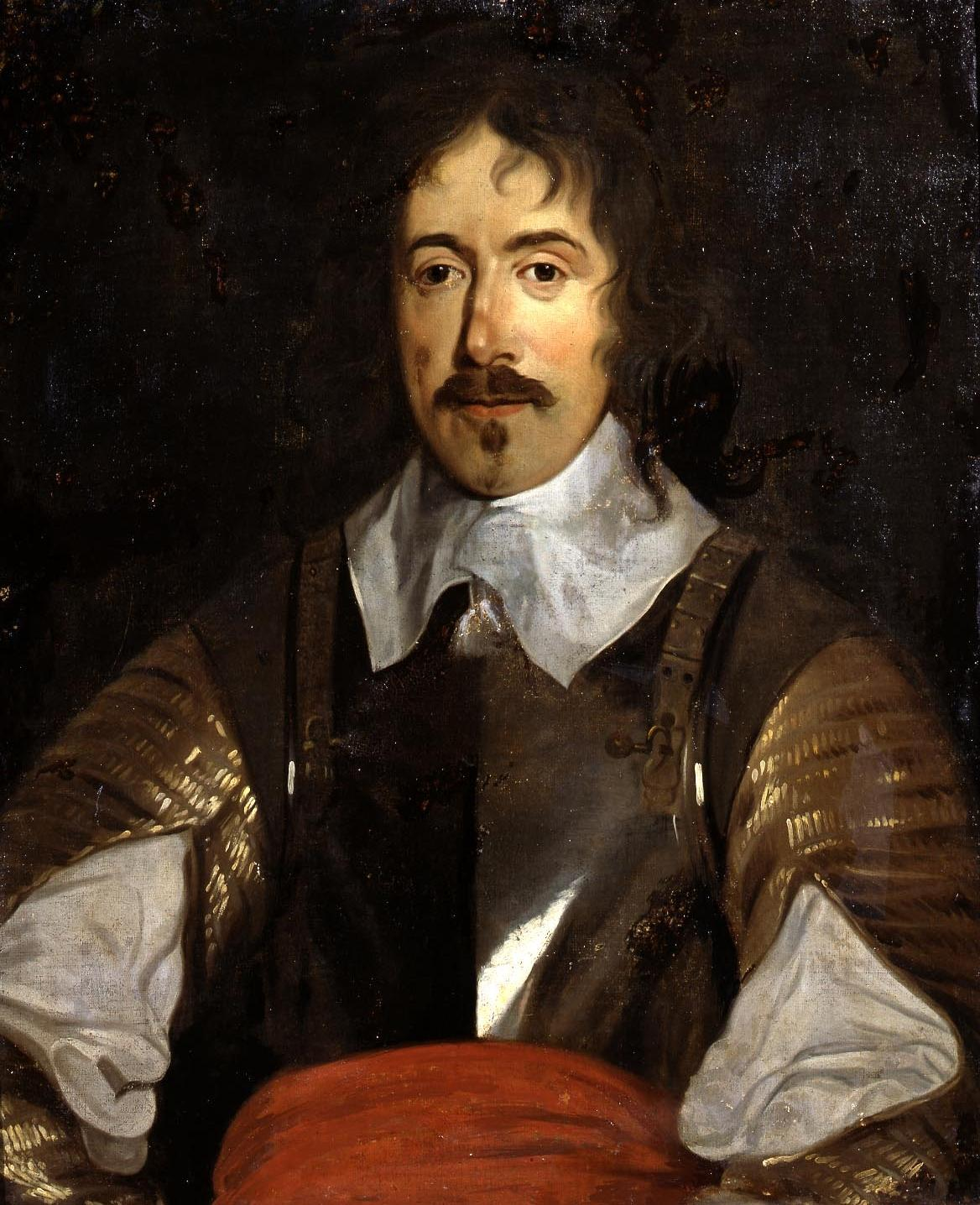
Denzil Holles, one of the Eleven Members, and leader of the Presbyterian faction in Parliament

Parliament's victory in the 1642 to 1646 First English Civil War intensified an internal political struggle over a settlement with Charles I. From 1643 on, Parliament was split into a 'Peace Party', led by Denzil Holles, who sought a negotiated end to the conflict. The 'War Party' argued there could be no negotiation until military victory, its best known member being Oliver Cromwell.

Presbyterians were represented in both factions, including Sir Thomas Fairfax, commander of the New Model Army. (Note: In the 17th century, Puritans were simply members of the Church of England who wanted to 'purify' or reform it; they consisted of many different sects, Presbyterians being the most prominent.) The Peace Party were allies of the Scots Covenanters, who also wanted a negotiated settlement; they are called Presbyterian since they supported the 1643 Solemn League and Covenant, and its commitment to a unified, Presbyterian Church of Scotland and England. Negotiations over the terms were carried on by the 1643 to 1653 Westminster Assembly.

They were opposed in Parliament by the so-called Independents, who opposed any state-mandated religion, and were heavily represented in the New Model Army. In addition, English Royalists and many who fought for Parliament were neither Presbyterian, nor Independent, but supporters of an Episcopalian Church of England. This makes it difficult to generalise on political and religious views.

However, the Peace Party fundamentally misunderstood Charles; when Prince Rupert told him in August 1645 the war was lost, Charles responded he was correct, if seen from a military viewpoint, but 'God will not suffer rebels and traitors to prosper'. This deeply-held conviction meant he refused any substantial concessions. Aware of divisions among his opponents, he used his position as king of both Scotland and England to deepen them, assuming he was essential to any government.

By 1647, Parliament was struggling with the economic cost of the war, a poor 1646 harvest, and plague, while it had to suspend wages for the New Model to raise cash for the Scots. The Presbyterians had substantial support among the London Trained Bands, and by March 1647, they felt strong enough to order the New Model to Ireland. Only those who agreed would receive their arrears, and when regimental representatives, or Agitators, demanded full payment for all in advance, Parliament disbanded it.

The New Model refused to be disbanded; in early June, the Army Council presented peace terms to Charles, which he rejected. Parliament protested at the creation of a separate, largely unelected power centre; in June 1647, the Army's supporters in Parliament demanded the impeachment of eleven members. After this was refused, Holles and the others withdrew, in order to prevent violence.

== Members ==
- Sir John Clotworthy; imprisoned 1648 to 1651, died 1665;
- John Glynne; Lord Chief Justice 1655 to 1660, died 1666;
- Edward Harley; MP from 1656 to 1695, died 1700;
- Denzil Holles; exiled 1648 to 1654, returned to politics after 1660, died 1680
- Sir William Lewis
- Walter Long
- Edward Massie
- Sir John Maynard
- Anthony Nicholl
- Sir Philip Stapleton
- Sir William Waller

== Sources ==
- Holles, Denzil (1647). Desires propounded to the Honourable House of Commons from Denzill Holles, Esq; Sir Philip Stapleton, Sir William Lewis, Sir John Clotworthy, Sir William Waller, Sir John Maynard, Knights, Major Generall Massey, John Glynne Esquire, Recorder of London, Walter Long, Esq; Col. Edward Harley, and Anthony Nicoll, Esq; members of the Honourable House of Commons. VVho stand impeached by His Excellency Sir Tho. Fairfax, and the army under his command. Also their demurrer to the charge: and the votes of the House, giving them leave to goe beyond the seas, and to absent themselves for six moneths: and Mr. Speaker to grant them passes. Robert Ibbotson.
- Rees, John (2016). The Leveller Revolution. Verso. ISBN 978-1784783907.
- Royle, Trevor (2004). Civil War: The Wars of the Three Kingdoms 1638–1660 (2006 ed.). Abacus. ISBN 978-0-349-11564-1.
- Wedgwood, CV (1958). The King's War, 1641-1647 (2001 ed.). Penguin Classics. ISBN 978-0141390727.
