= William Whiteway (diarist) =

English merchant, diarist and politician

William Whiteway (1599–1635) was an English merchant and politician who sat in the House of Commons in 1626. His diaries provide a record of Dorchester at the beginning of the 17th century.

Whiteway was the son of William Whiteway and his wife Mary Mounsell. He attended the Free School in Dorchester between 1606 and 1615 under Robert Cheeke and became a merchant of Dorchester. He made his first journey to France in 1616. In 1621 he became a Freeman of Dorchester.1621. He became a lieutenant in the militia and an assistant to the governor of freemen in 1622. In 1624 he became governor and a capital burgess.

In 1626, Whiteway was elected Member of Parliament for Dorchester on the death of the sitting member Michael Humphreys. He became a steward of the hospital in 1626 and overseer of the poor for Holy Trinity parish in 1628. In 1629 he became bailiff and in 1630 he was town steward. Under the new Charter for Dorchester issued by Charles I on 22 December 1630 he was listed as Capital burgess and first alderman. He was feoffee of All Saints church and bailiff again in 1633.

Whiteway kept diaries from about 1619 which recorded all major events of the town and family events. He displayed a wide range of interests and was knowledgeable about astronomy, geology, art and architecture. His library included books on logic medicine and mathematics. He was interested in history and was planning to write a history of England. He was a puritan and so interested in the religious controversies of the time. For business reasons he also took an interest in foreign affairs.

Whiteway died at the age of about 35.

Whiteway was married to Elinor Parkins, daughter of John Parkins merchant of Dorchester, at Holy Trinity church by Rev. John White in 1620.

Parliament of England
Preceded by Michael Humphreys; Richard Bushrode	Member of Parliament for Dorchester; 1626; With: Richard Bushrode	Succeeded by Denzil Holles; John Hill
