= Worcester Park House =

One of the residences of the 4th Earl of Worcester, in the UK

Coordinates: 51.37475°N 0.26151°W

Map showing the location of Worcester Park House within Surrey.

Worcester Park House, built in 1607, whose ruins are in Surrey, in the United Kingdom, was one of the residences of the 4th Earl of Worcester, who was appointed Keeper of the Great Park of nearby Nonsuch Palace in 1606.

During the English Commonwealth the park and house were bought by Colonel Thomas Pride, of Pride's Purge fame. Pride died in the house in 1658. In 1663 a long lease of the house and park was granted to Sir Robert Long, 1st Baronet, by Charles II and a life was added to this lease in 1670. The area known as Worcester Park was once part of a Great Park surrounding the Nonsuch Palace of Henry VIII, and was used extensively for hunting. Samuel Pepys visited Sir Robert Long at Worcester Park House, in November 1665, while the Exchequer was using Nonsuch during the plague.

It has been claimed that the first version of the painting The Light of the World (1851–3) by the English Pre-Raphaelite artist William Holman Hunt (1827–1910) was painted at night in a makeshift hut at the house, the other claimant being the garden of the Oxford University Press

Worcester Park House burned down in a great fire in 1948. The remaining walls and chimneys were gradually demolished by the youth of the area during the following ten years. Fruit from the abandoned trees of the old orchards was especially welcome in the postwar years.

The lake also silted up during this period following improvements to the Hogsmill River. The ruins of a splendid ornamental lake with a multi-arched bridge (at grid reference TQ211654) and balustrade were still visible in the woodland at the foot of the hill in "Parker's Field" (situated between Grafton Road and Old Malden Lane, and behind the still rather ramshackle stables in Grafton Road). The house was positioned so that it had a view of the arches and balustrade.

== The ruins today ==
The house itself was not visible, even in the late 1950s, nor were there any obvious ruins apart from the lake and some mounds of brickwork to be found. The lake itself had drained into the river Hogsmill, but no source of incoming water was visible. To the northeast of the site is a small, often dry, stream at the field boundary, running SE->NW, with some old and modern culverting and which drains into the Hogsmill.

There was an impressive kitchen garden with glasshouses and an inner walled garden. During World War II a local policeman "looked after" the walled garden and kept everyone else out.

Close to the bridge remnant, to the southwest of the bridge, was a ruined domed structure that resembled an ice house. However, it was filled with soil and other débris which prevented any investigation in the 1950s, and has all but disappeared today.

Confirmation that the site of Blakesley School was "Worcester Court", not "Worcester park House" - 1930 map

Locals presumed the house to be named "Worcester Park House", and have suggested that the former Blakesley School, was the original house, while historical sources (below) suggest "Worcester House" as the name. However the map of 1871 shows a building labelled "Worcester Park House" to be alongside the lake, to the west of it, on land that was, in the 1950s, overgrown with trees. The scant overgrown ruins in the photographs of the site fit with this map.

Exploration of the site in May 2006 reveals loss of the balustrades, the bridge and the lake, which has been filled and is now used for horses. The remainder of the site is heavily wooded and has dense undergrowth, with some contemporary fly tipping of refuse.

== Photographs of the site, May 2006 ==
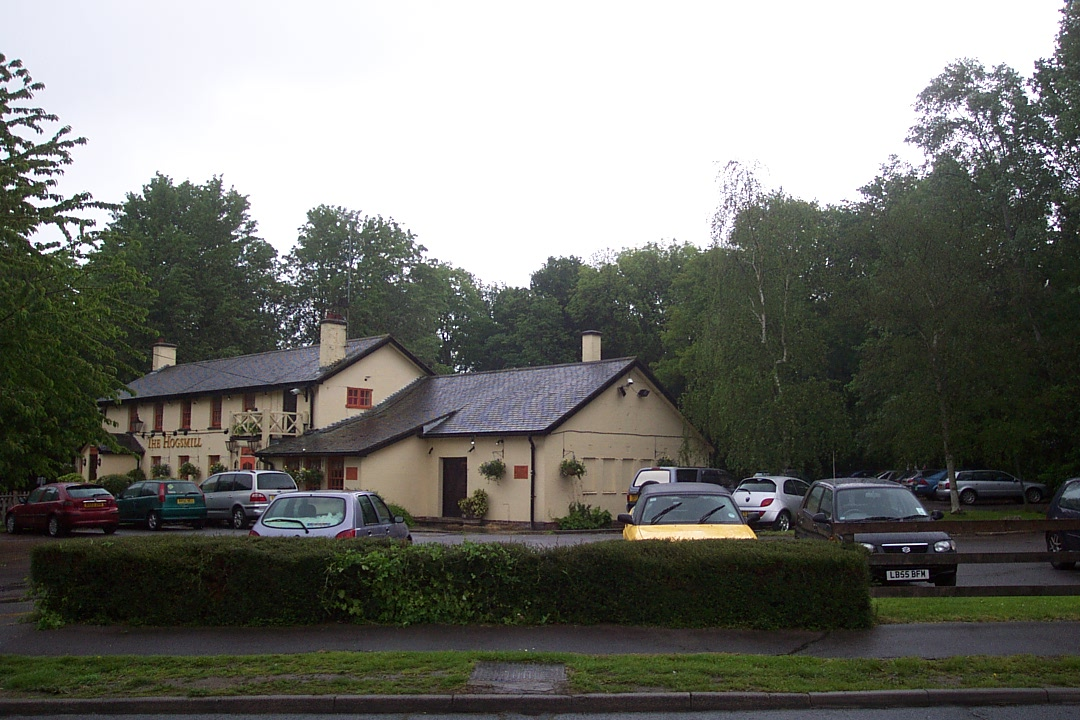
Hogsmill Tavern, Cromwell Road

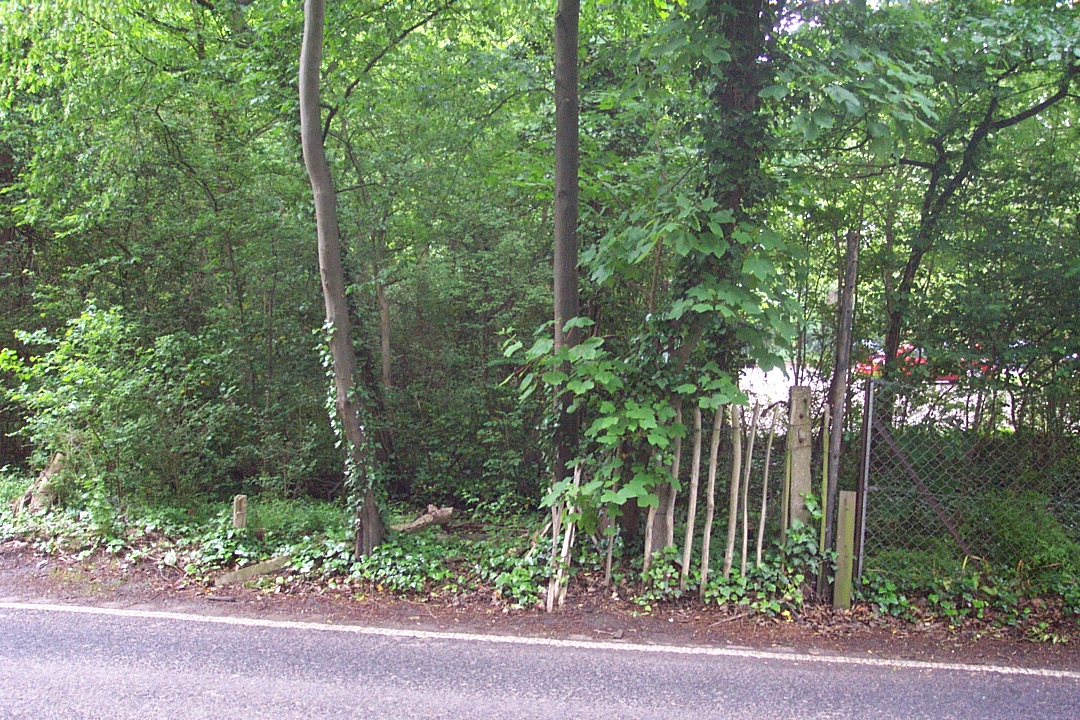
Entrance to the ruins behind the Hogsmill Tavern

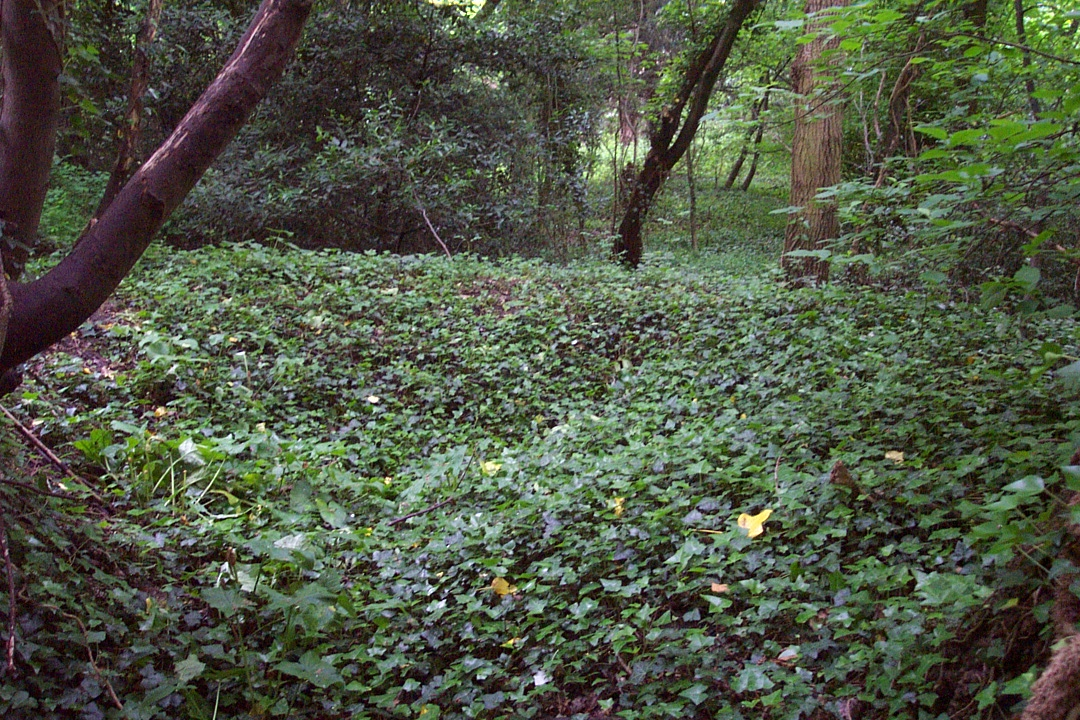
View from entrance of possible ice house

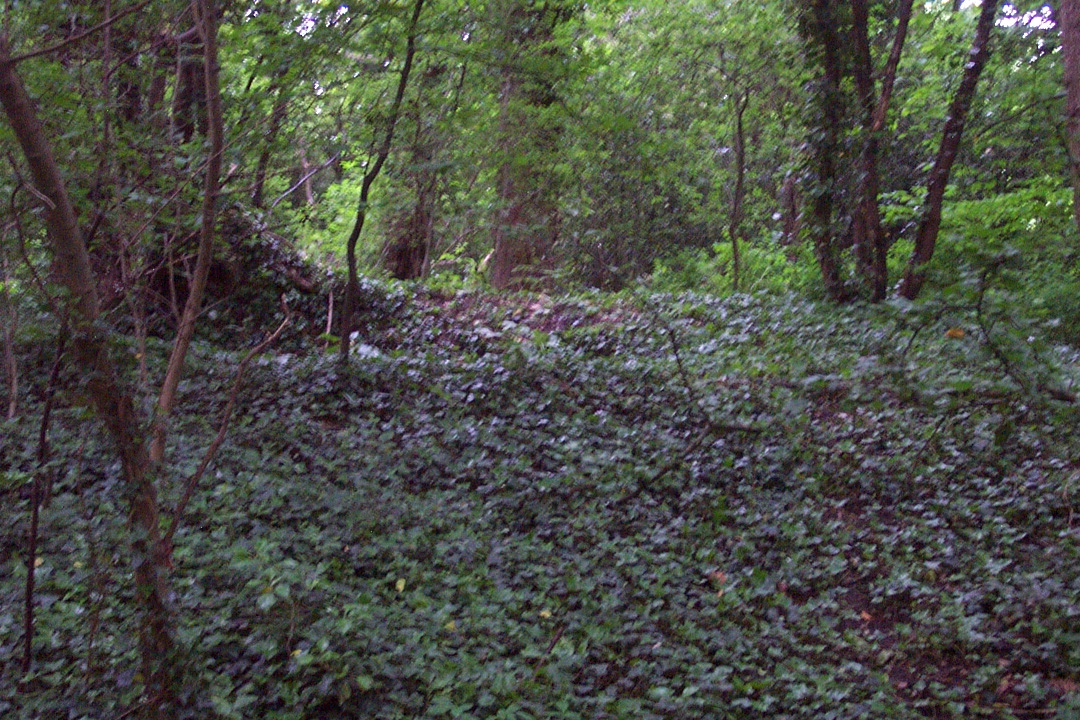
View of ice house from the right of prior picture

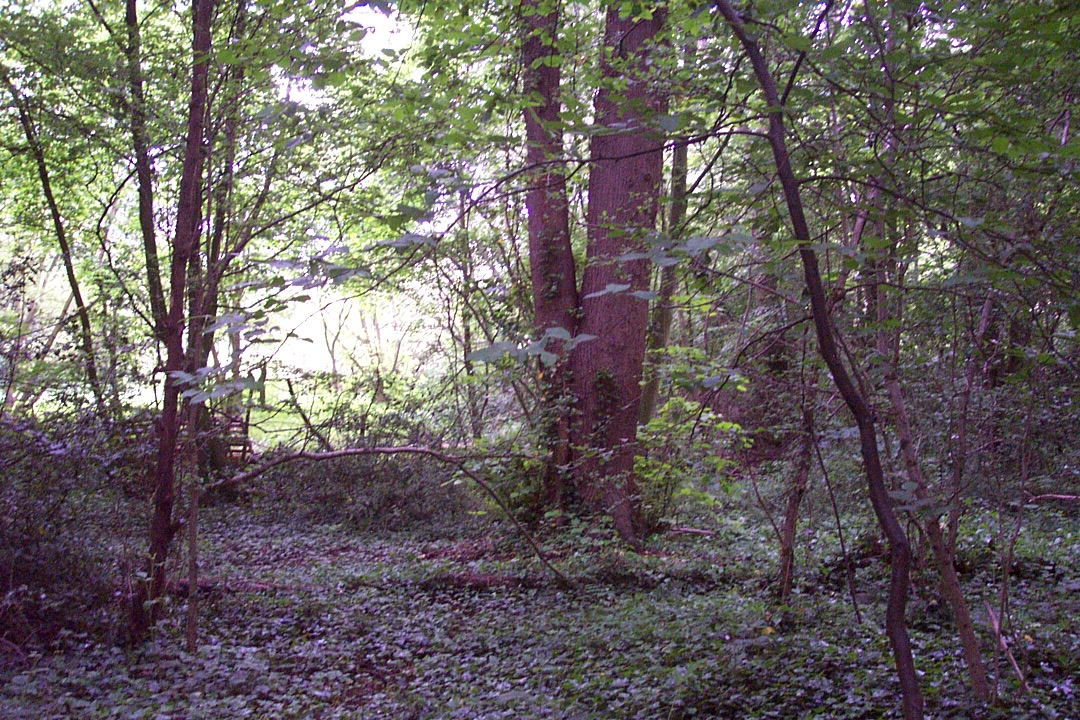
View from the ice house towards where the balustrade used to be

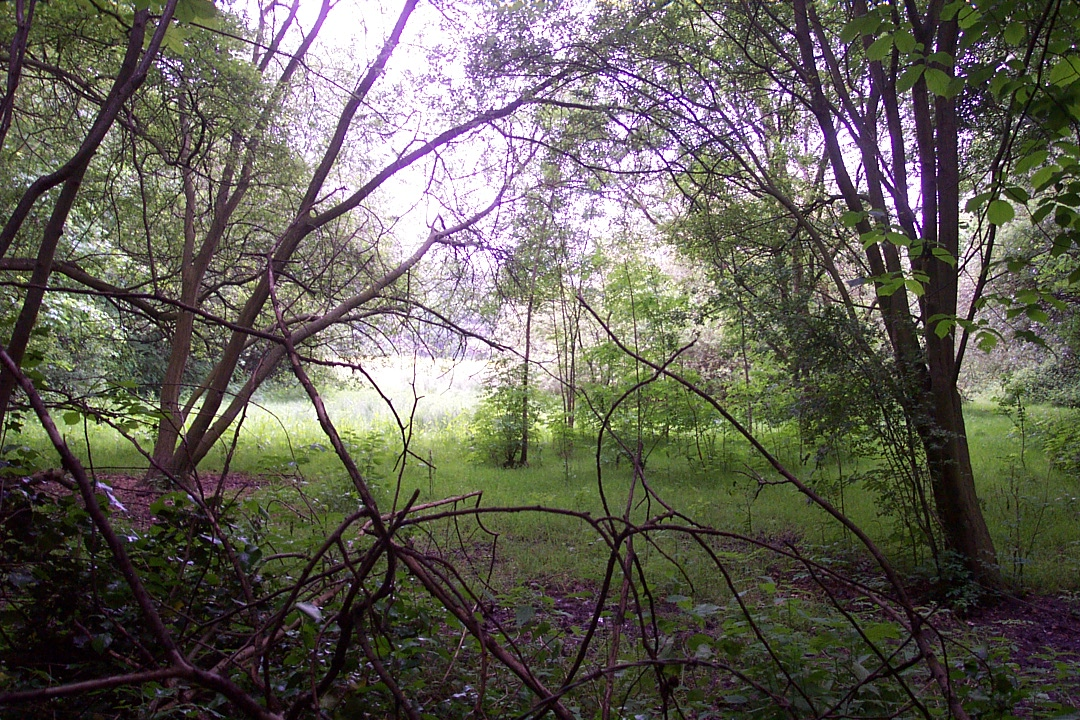
View from the point where the bridge used to be along the old lake

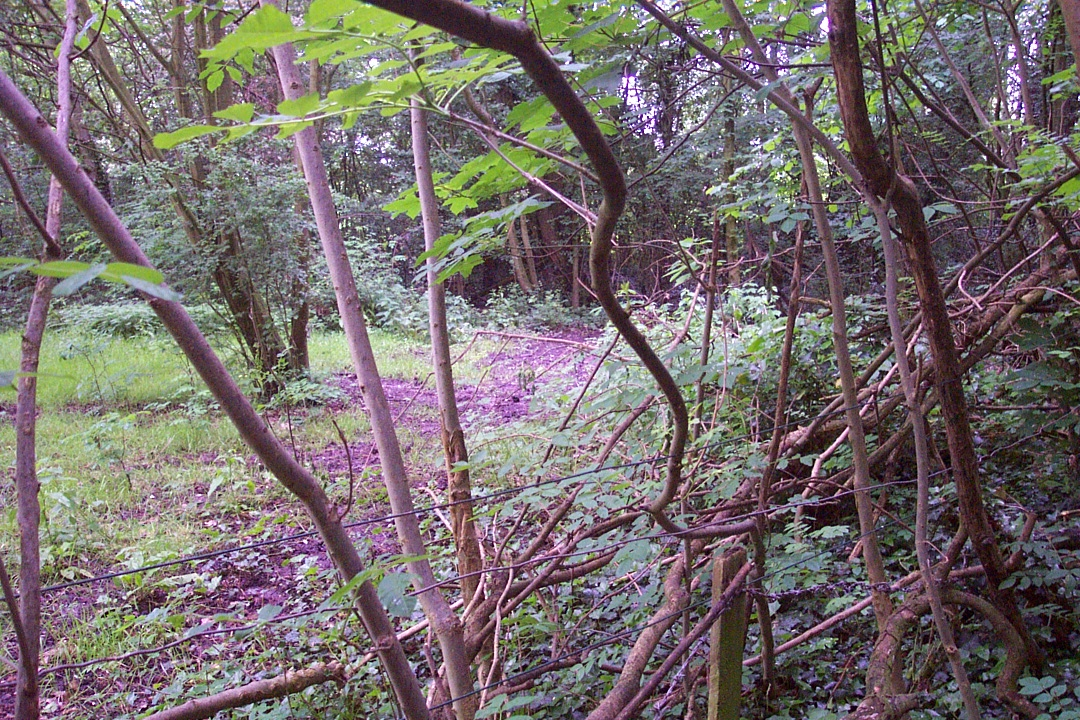
View across the old lake, with the ruined bridge to your right

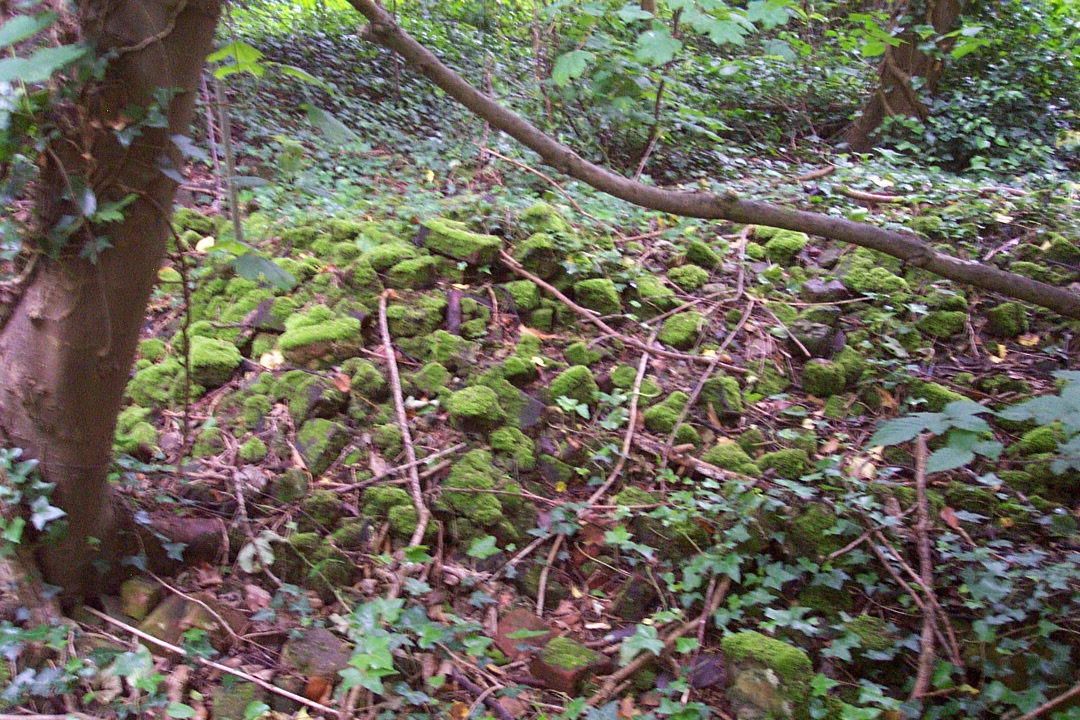
Brick rubble - Part of the ruins?

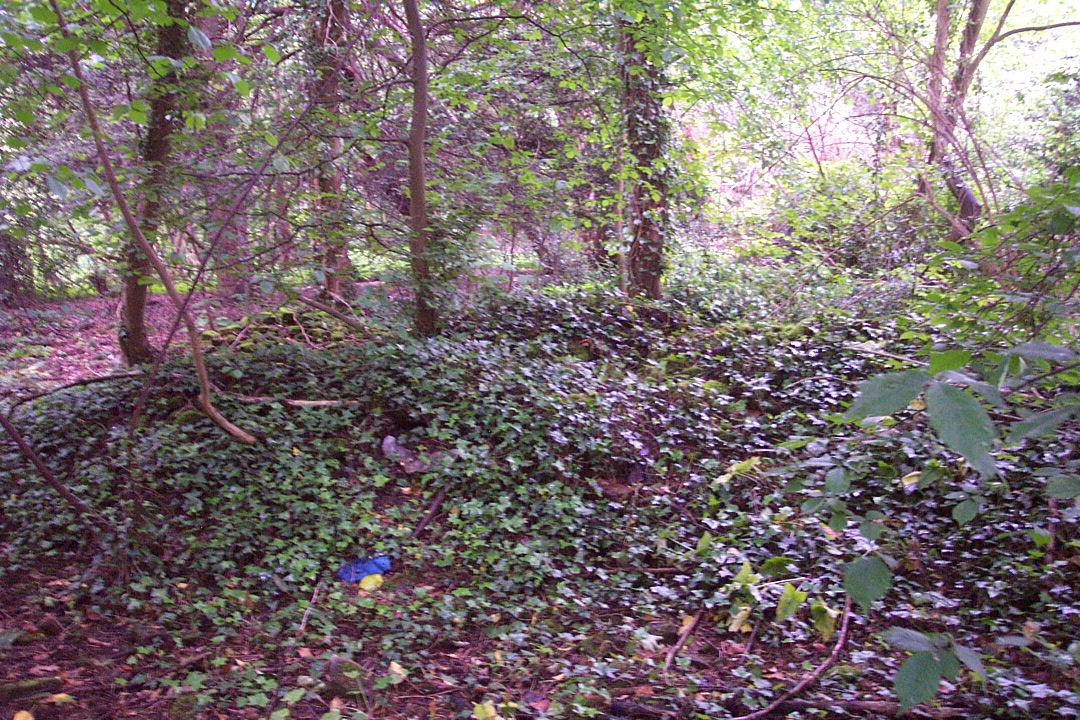
Apparent ruined walls in bricks covered by earth

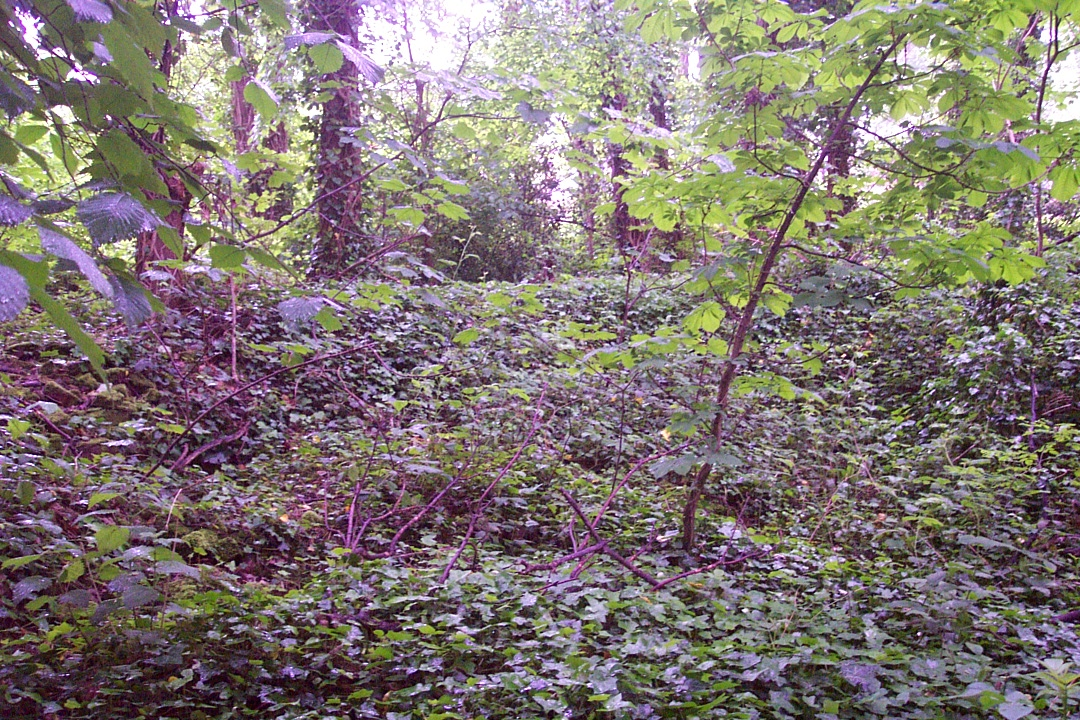
Apparent ruined walls in bricks covered by earth
