= Francis Ashley =

English lawyer and politician

Member of Parliament for Dorchester
- In office 1614-1622; 1625

Personal details
- Born: 24 November 1569 Damerham, England
- Died: 28 November 1635 (aged 66) London, England
- Spouse: Anne Samways
- Children: 1+
- Relatives: Anthony Ashley Cooper (nephew); Denzil Holles (son-in-law)
- Education: Magdalen College, Oxford
- Occupation: Politician, lawyer

Sir Francis Ashley (24 November 1569 – 28 November 1635) was an English lawyer and politician who sat in the House of Commons at various times between 1614 and 1625.

== Biography ==
Ashley was born at Damerham, the son of Sir Anthony Ashley of Damerham in Wiltshire and his wife Dorothy Lyte, daughter of John Lyte of Lytes Cary, Somerset. At the age of 16, he entered Magdalen College, Oxford, and graduated with BA on 5 June 1589. He went on to study law at the Middle Temple where he was called to the bar in 1596. In 1610 he was appointed recorder of Dorchester. He purchased the Old Friary on the north side of the town by the River Frome, where he made extensive alterations, and lived there with his family.

In 1614, Ashley was elected Member of Parliament for Dorchester. He became reader at the Middle Temple in 1616. In 1617 he became Serjeant-at-law and in the same year granted to Rev. Robert Cheeke, the master of the Dorchester Free School and Rector of All Saints Church, Dorchester, all his "tithes of corne, grayne, hay, woole, lambes, oak etc belonging to the free chapel of Pudle Waterston". Ashley was knighted on 5 July 1618. In 1621 he was re-elected MP for Dorchester but on 13 February 1621 resigned his place in favour of Sir Thomas Edmondes. However, Edmondes chose to sit elsewhere and Ashley was chosen again as MP for Dorchester on 9 Mar 1621. He was greatly influenced by the Rev. John White, rector of Holy Trinity Church, Dorchester and St Peters, and with him and others invested in 1624 in the Massachusetts Bay Company, also known as the Dorchester Company.

Ashley was elected MP for Dorchester again in 1625. In Parliament, he strongly supported the royal prerogative and was an active member and chairman of committees However, in his religious views he was sympathetic to the Puritan cause. He became King's Serjeant in 1625 and was very active at Dorchester sitting regularly at the Quarter Sessions from 1625 until his death. He was chosen as the judge for an extraordinary commission set up on 17 January 1627 when he condemned seven soldiers and a tapster to death for burglary although six soldiers were later pardoned. On 22 April 1628, he was imprisoned by the House of Lords for speaking against the liberty of the subject, but was released when he recanted and craved pardon. As King's Serjeant, he represented the Crown in various cases including the trial of John Felton, the assassin of George Villiers, 1st Duke of Buckingham. He suffered an attack of palsy in London on 7 January 1629 but recovered. In the new charter granted to Dorchester on 22 September 1629, his appointment as recorder was confirmed. On 19 June 1630, he had to defend himself before the Star Chamber against accusations of a conspiracy against Thomas Coventry, 1st Baron Coventry, the Lord Keeper, who "scandalized him by saying he had taken a bribe of six hundred pounds".

Ashley's nephew Anthony Ashley Cooper had been left very extensive estates through the death of his father and grandfather and these were under the control of the Court of Wards. Ashley was among the administrators of the estates and Cooper later accused these administrators of attempting to wrest some of his lands from him while he was still a minor and a law of Court. Ashley, he singled out, almost certainly unfairly, as the worst and most avaricious offender who used his legal abilities and influences to obtain his ends through the Court of Wards. In one of these proceedings on 16 November 1635, Ashley was making a speech before the Court when his nephew uttered a prayer to be delivered from the lawyer's arguments and purposes. At this point, Ashley collapsed with a paralytic seizure with "his mouth drawn to his ear" and was carried out of the Court and never spoke again. He died 12 days later on 28 November 1635 at the Serjeant's Inn in Fleet Street at the age of 66. His body was brought back to Dorchester and buried in St Peter's Church, Dorchester.

Ashley married Anne Samways, the eldest daughter of Bernard (or Robert) Samways of Toller Fratrum and through her, he acquired lands and property at Winterborne St Martin although only after a lengthy lawsuit with Sir Francis Fulford, who married Anne's sister Elizabeth. Their only surviving child was Dorothy who married Denzil Holles on 4 June 1626.

Parliament of England
Preceded by John Spicer; Matthew Chubb	Member of Parliament for Dorchester; 1614–1622; With: George Horsey 1614; John Parkins 1621–1622	Succeeded by William Whiteway; Richard Bushrode
Preceded by William Whiteway; Richard Bushrode	Member of Parliament for Dorchester; 1625; With: William Whiteway	Succeeded by Richard Bushrode; Michael Humphreys
