= William Whiteway (MP) =

English merchant and politician

William Whiteway (1570–1640) was an English merchant and politician who sat in the House of Commons in 1624 and 1625.

Whiteway was born at Denbury, Devon and left his home town to become an apprentice merchant. He made his first visit to Dorchester in 1585. In 1590 he was imprisoned as a Protestant in Honfleur, France. He settled permanently in Dorchester in 1600 as a merchant and was successful in trade, especially with France. He was active in public office. In 1610 he was listed as a capital burgess under the charter. In 1624, he was elected Member of Parliament for Dorchester. He was re-elected MP for Dorchester in 1625 and was bailiff in 1626. In 1629 he was an Alderman under the new charter and was elected mayor in 1631. He was bailiff for the fourth time in 1635.

Whiteway died at the age of about 70.

Whiteway married Married Mary Mounsell who was from a trading family in 1598. They had sons William and John.

Parliament of England
Preceded by Sir Francis Ashley < John Parkins	Member of Parliament for Dorchester; 1624–1625; With: Richard Bushrode 1624; Sir Francis Ashley	Succeeded by Michael Humphreys; Richard Bushrode
