= Baron Holles =

Extinct barony in the Peerage of England

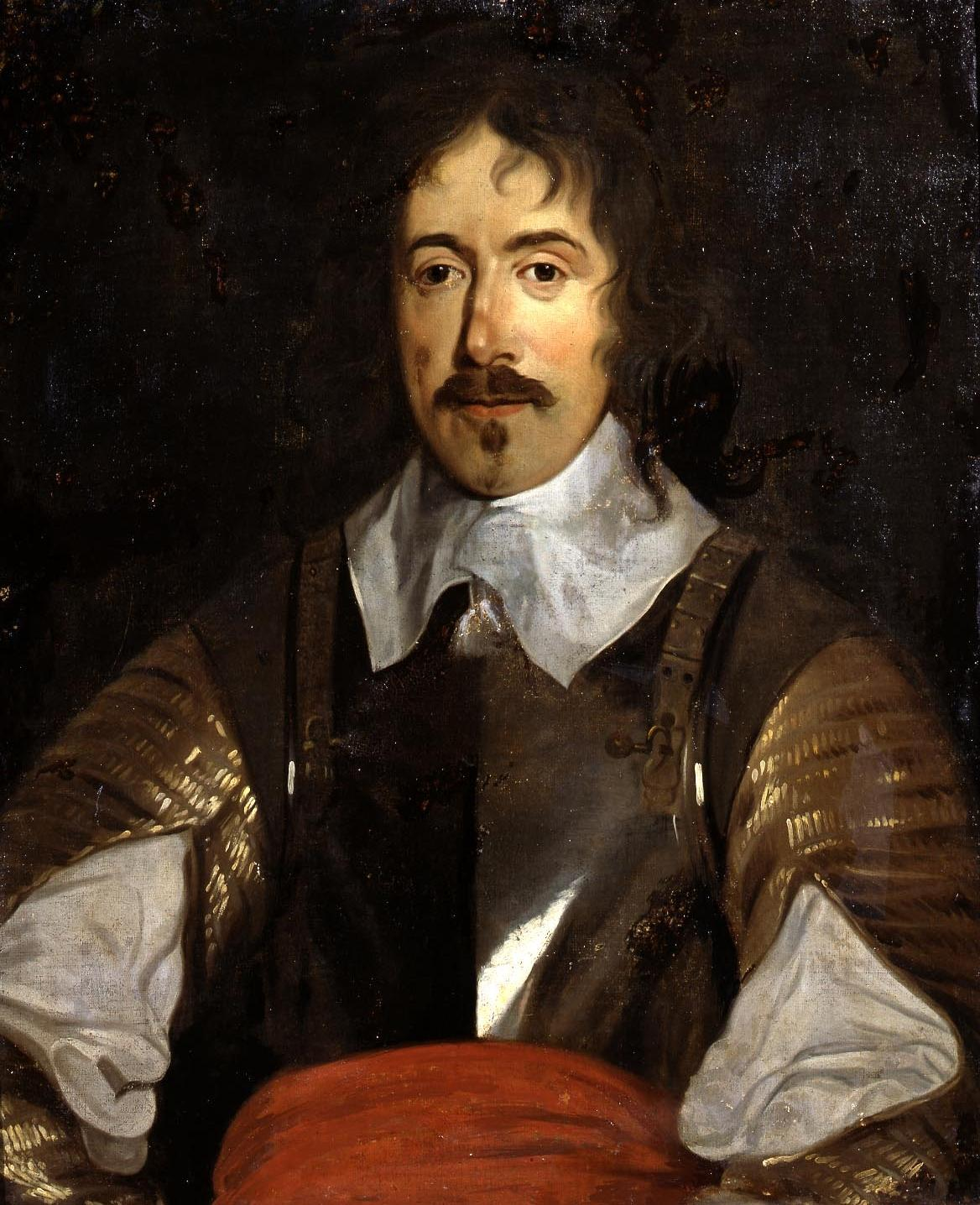
Denzil Holles, 1st Baron Holles.

Baron Holles, of Ifield in the County of Sussex, was a title in the Peerage of England. It was created on 20 April 1661 for Denzil Holles, second son of John Holles, 1st Earl of Clare. He was succeeded by his son, the second Baron. He had already been created a Baronet, of Winterbourne in the County of Dorset, in the Baronetage of England in 1660. The titles became extinct on the death of his son, the third Baron and second Baronet, in c. 1692.

== Barons Holles (1661) ==
- Denzil Holles, 1st Baron Holles (1599–1680)
- Francis Holles, 2nd Baron Holles (1627–1690)
- Denzil Holles, 3rd Baron Holles (1675–c. 1692)

== See also ==
- Earl of Clare
