= Thomas Pride =

English army officer

Thomas Pride JP
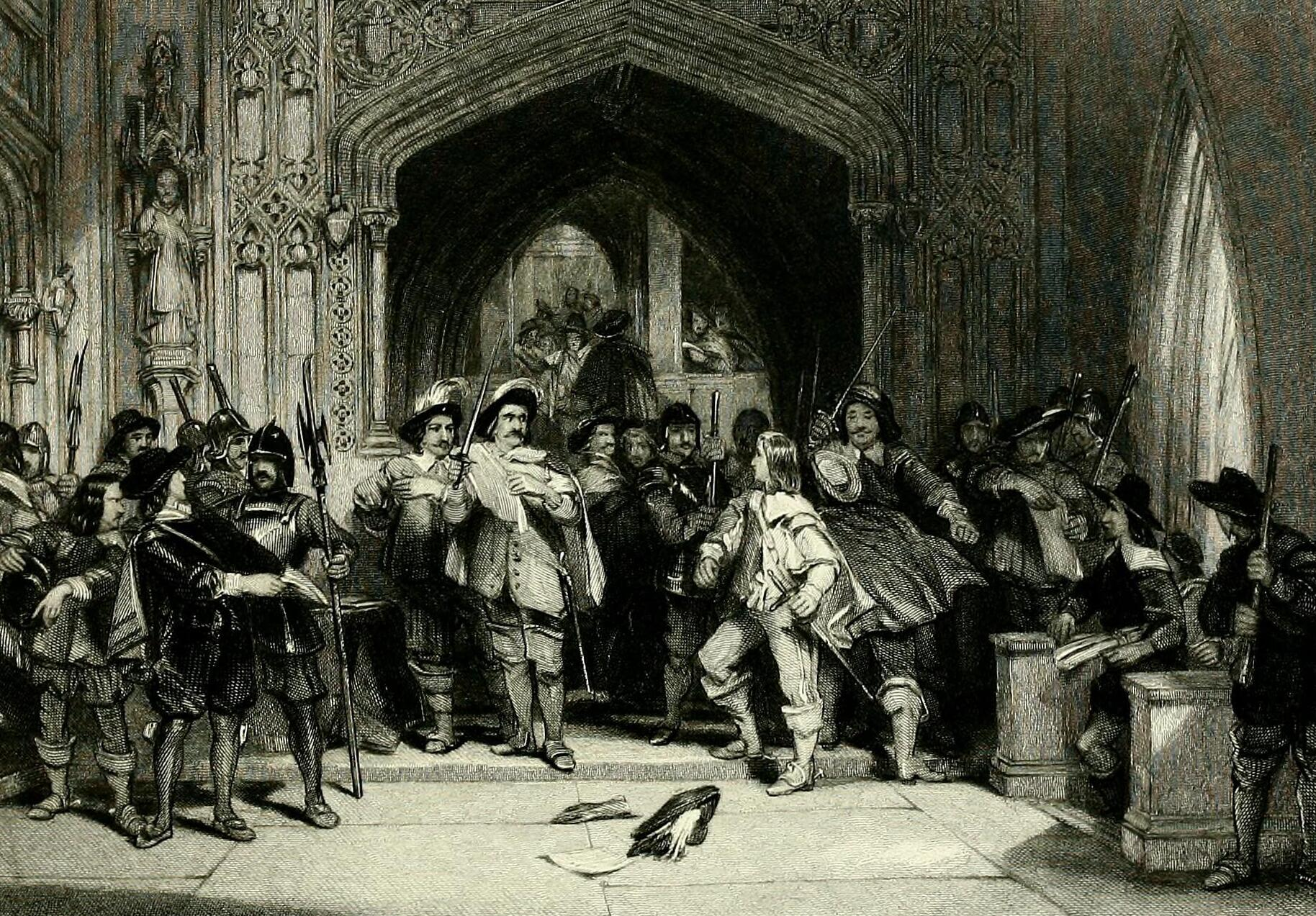
- Pride (centre) during Pride's Purge on 6 December 1648

High Sheriff of Surrey
- In office 1655–1656

Personal details
- Born: c. 1606–1608 Ashcott, Somerset
- Died: 23 October 1658 (aged 52) Worcester Park House, Surrey
- Spouse: Elizabeth Tomson (1629 to his death)
- Children: Thomas, Joseph, William, Samuel, Elizabeth
- Occupation: Political and religious radical, regicide and Parliamentarian soldier

Military service
- Years of service: 1642 to 1654
- Rank: Colonel
- Battles/wars: Wars of the Three Kingdoms; First Newbury; Lostwithiel; Naseby; Langport; Torrington; Oxford; Preston; Dunbar; Worcester

Colonel Thomas Pride (c. 1607 – 23 October 1658) was an English army officer who fought on the Parliamentarian side during the Wars of the Three Kingdoms. He is best known for being one of the regicides of Charles I, and the instigator of Pride's Purge in December 1648.

== Personal details ==
Thomas Pride was born in Ashcott, Somerset, son of William Pride, a local tradesman. His exact date of birth is unknown but he was apprenticed to a City of London merchant in January 1622 and since the normal age for this was between 14 and 17 years old, he was probably born between 1606 and 1608.

Shortly after his seven-year apprenticeship finished in 1629, he married Elizabeth Tomson, daughter of another London merchant. His 1658 will made bequests to four sons, Thomas, Joseph, William and Samuel, and a daughter, Elizabeth.

== Career ==
Pride went into business as a brewer, and by the early 1640s owned two brewhouses in Surrey and possibly one in Edinburgh. He was also an ensign in the London Trained bands and when the First English Civil War began in August 1642, he served as a captain in the Parliamentarian under Robert Devereux, 3rd Earl of Essex, and was eventually promoted to the rank of colonel. He distinguished himself at the Battle of Preston in 1648 and with his regiment took part in the military occupation of London in December 1648, which was the first step towards bringing King Charles I to trial.

== Trial of King Charles I ==
The next step was the expulsion of the Presbyterian and Royalist elements in the House of Commons, who were thought to be prepared to reach a settlement with Charles. This action was resolved by the army council and ordered by the lord general, Fairfax, and was carried out by Colonel Pride's regiment. Taking his stand at the entrance of the House of Commons with a written list in his hand, he caused the arrest or exclusion of the members, who were pointed out to him. After about a hundred members had been thus dealt with, the reduced House of Commons, now reduced to about eighty in number, proceeded to bring the king to trial. This marked the end of the Long Parliament and the beginning of the Rump Parliament.

Pride was one of the trial judges and one of the regicides of King Charles I, having signed and sealed the king's death warrant. His coat of arms appears on his seal.

== Subsequent career ==
Pride commanded an infantry brigade under Oliver Cromwell at the Battle of Dunbar (1650) and at the Battle of Worcester (1651). He purchased the estate of Nonsuch Palace in Surrey, and in 1655 was appointed Sheriff of Surrey.

== Retirement and knighthood ==
When the Commonwealth of England was established he abandoned his involvement in politics, except in opposing the proposal to confer the kingly dignity on Cromwell. In 1656 he was knighted by Cromwell, then Lord Protector, and was appointed to the second house added to Parliament as a result of the Humble Petition and Advice.

== Marriage ==
He married Elizabeth Monk (born 1628), a daughter of Thomas Monk of Potheridge in Devon by his wife Mary Gould, a daughter of William Gould of Hayes. Elizabeth's uncle was the royalist general George Monck, 1st Duke of Albemarle (1608–1670), KG, the key figure in effecting the Restoration of the Monarchy to King Charles II in 1660.

== Death ==
Pride died in 1658 at his home of Worcester Park House, having bought it and the "Great Park" of Nonsuch Palace, Surrey. After the Restoration of 1660 his body was ordered dug up and suspended on the gallows at Tyburn along with those of Cromwell, Henry Ireton and John Bradshaw, though it is said that the sentence was not carried out, probably because his corpse was too far decayed.

== Bibliography ==
- Mark Noble, The lives of the English regicides. 1798.
- George Bate, The lives, actions, and execution of the prime actors, and principall contrivers of that horrid murder of our late pious and sacred soveraigne, King Charles the First. 1661.
- Thomas Carlyle, Oliver Cromwell's letters and speeches 1845.
- Robert Hodkinson, Cromwell's Buffoon - The Life and Career of the Regicide Thomas Pride. 2017.

== Sources ==
- Gentles, Ian (2004). "Pride, Thomas, appointed Lord Pride under the Protectorate". Oxford Dictionary of National Biography (online ed.). Oxford University Press. doi:10.1093/ref:odnb/22781. (Subscription, Wikipedia Library access or UK public library membership required.)
- Hodkinson, Robert (2017). Cromwell's Buffoon: The Life and Career of the Regicide, Thomas Pride. Helion & Company. ISBN 978-1911512110.
- TNA. "Will of Thomas Lord Pride or Pride of Worcester House, Surrey". The National Archives.
- Wallis, Patrick; Webb, Cliff; Minns, Chris (2009). Leaving Home and Entering Service: The Age of Apprenticeship in Early Modern London (PDF) (Working Paper). LSE.
