= Michael Humphreys (MP) =

English politician who sat in the House of Commons in 1626

Michael Humphreys (died 3 April 1626) was an English politician who sat in the House of Commons in 1626.

Humphreys was a gentleman of Chaldon Herring and of Dorchester and was clerk to Viscount Bindon. He was an alderman and magistrate of Dorchester in 1625. In 1626, he was elected Member of Parliament for Dorchester but died in office. Was also a world renowned deer hunter claiming numerous large red stags

Humphreys died in London on 3 April 1626.

Humphreys married as his second wife Martha Pride at Bridport on 4 July 1615.

Parliament of England
| Preceded by William Whiteway; Sir Francis Ashley | Member of Parliament for Dorchester; 1626; With: Richard Bushrode | Succeeded by Richard Bushrode; William Whiteway |
