= John Hill (MP for Dorchester) =

English merchant and politician

John Hill (c. 1589–1657) of Dorchester was an English merchant and politician who sat in the House of Commons from 1628 to 1629.

Hill was the son of Roger Hill of Poundisford and his wife Mary Hassard of Lyme Regis and became an ironmonger. With Dennis Bond he was made a constable of Dorchester in 1618. On 11 September 1621 he was appointed the first Governor of the Company of Freemen. Later he replaced John Yeate as an Alderman of Dorchester and a week later was appointed a Capital Burgess. He was an enthusiastic supporter of John White's schemes to create a godly community. In 1624 he invested in the Dorchester Company and was a member of a circle known as the New England Parliament which met in the Free School in Dorchester. In October 1624 he was elected Bailiff.

In 1628, Hill was elected Member of Parliament for Dorchester and sat until 1629 when King Charles decided to rule without parliament for eleven years. In 1631 he was elected steward of the Seaton Parsonage where he was responsible for holding funds and for collecting tithes. He was elected treasurer of the county at the Quarter Sessions in Sherborne on 30 April 1633. In 1636 he was elected Mayor of Dorchester. During this time he owned several privateers.

He held the Seaton Stewardship until 1642 at the start of the Civil War. In 1643, when Dorchester was threatened by the Royalists, Hill and other merchants in the town tried to send their goods to safety by ship from Weymouth, but it was captured. Nevertheless, the war presented opportunities to make money and among other things he sold provisions to the besiegers of Sherborne. He appears to have left Dorchester during the war and moved to London.

Hill died before 4 January 1658 when his will was proved in London. He left £100 for an endowment known as the Hill Exhibition to support a poor scholar from Dorchester at one of the universities.

Hill had married in about 1617 Sarah Davidge, widow of Thomas Davidge, merchant of Dorchester, and daughter of John Green merchant of Dorchester. They had at least a son and two daughters. His wife died in 1631.

Parliament of England
Preceded by William Whiteway; Richard Bulstrode	Member of Parliament for Dorchester; 1628–1629; With: Denzil Holles	Parliament suspended until 1640
