= John Parkins =

English merchant and politician

John Parkins (1571–1640) was an English merchant and politician who sat in the House of Commons from 1621 to 1622.

Parkins was the son of William Parkins of East Shilvinghampton near Portesham in Dorset. He became a merchant in Dorchester. On 1 October 1619 he became bailiff of the town for the third time. In 1621, he was elected Member of Parliament for Dorchester but served only for a year. He became bailiff again on 4 October 1624. On 10 July 1625 the ship Francis Sandars was taken by French pirates and as a result Parkins lost kerseys to the cost of £700.

On 6 October 1629 King Charles granted Dorchester a new charter and Parkins became first mayor under this charter.

Parkins died at the age of about 69.

Parkins married Rachel Chappell of Exeter as his second wife. Of their children, Eleanor married William Whiteway, and Margaret married Robert Walker.

Parliament of England
Preceded by Sir Francis Ashley; George Horsey	Member of Parliament for Dorchester; 1621–1622; With: Sir Francis Ashley; Sir Thomas Edmondes; Sir Francis Ashley	Succeeded by William Whiteway; Richard Bushrode
