= Pride's Purge =

Event in second English Civil War

- Part of the Second English Civil War
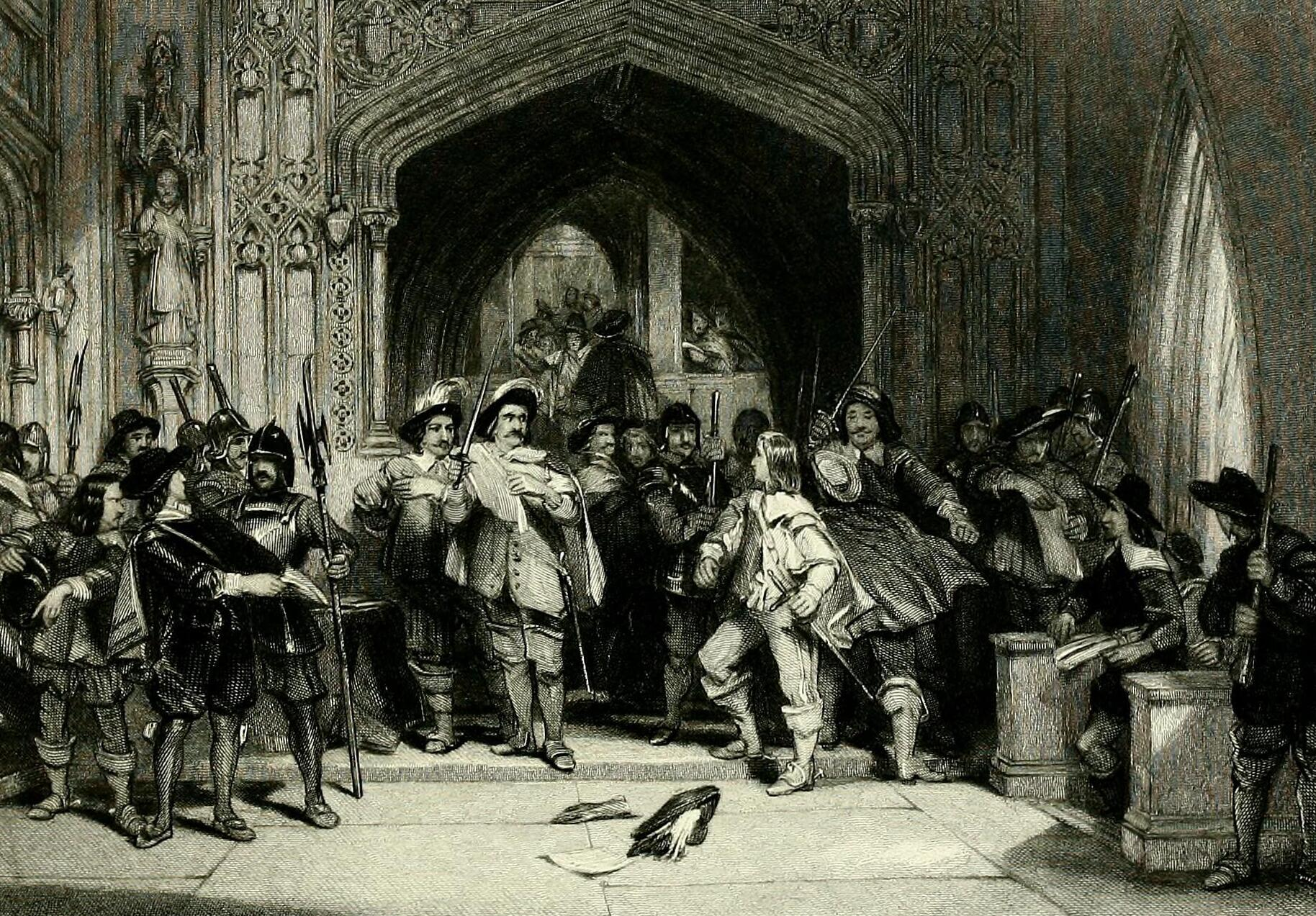
- New Model Army troops under Colonel Thomas Pride refusing admission to secluded members of the Long Parliament
- Planned by: Elements within the New Model Army
- Objective: Removal from the Long Parliament of members considered to be opponents of the New Model Army
- Date: 6 December 1648
- Outcome: Establishment of the Rump Parliament
- Casualties: None

Pride's Purge is the name commonly given to an event that took place on 6 December 1648, when soldiers prevented members of Parliament considered hostile to the New Model Army from entering the House of Commons of England.

Despite defeat in the First English Civil War, Charles I retained significant political power. This allowed him to create an alliance with Scots Covenanters and Parliamentarian moderates to restore him to the English throne. The result was the 1648 Second English Civil War, in which he was defeated once again.

Convinced only his removal could end the conflict, senior commanders of the New Model Army took control of London on 5 December. The next day, soldiers commanded by Colonel Thomas Pride forcibly excluded from the Long Parliament those MPs viewed as their opponents, and arrested 45.

The purge cleared the way for the execution of Charles in January 1649, and establishment of the Protectorate in 1653; it is considered the only recorded military coup d'état in English history.

== Background ==
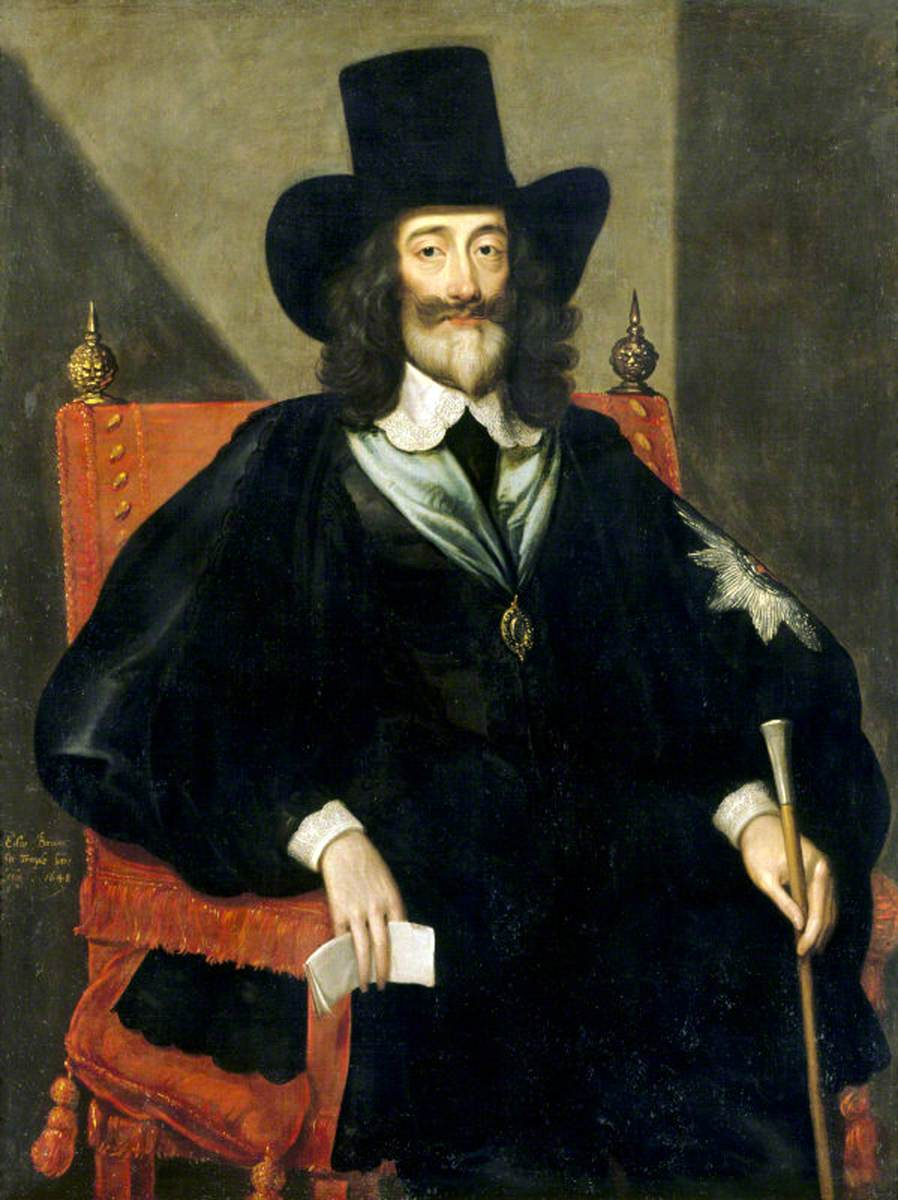
Charles I; by 1648, a significant element felt only his death could end the conflict

When the First English Civil War began in 1642, the vast majority on both sides believed a 'well-ordered' monarchy was divinely mandated. They disagreed on what 'well-ordered' meant, and who held ultimate authority in clerical affairs. Royalists generally supported a Church of England governed by bishops, appointed by, and answerable to, the king; Puritans tended to believe church leaders should be appointed by their congregations.

"Puritan" was a term for anyone who wanted to reform, or "purify", the Church of England, and contained many different perspectives. Presbyterians were the most prominent in the Long Parliament; in general, they wanted to convert the Church of England into a Presbyterian body, similar to the Church of Scotland. Independents opposed any state church, and although smaller in number, included Oliver Cromwell along with a significant portion of the New Model Army.

Having won control of Scotland in the 1639 to 1640 Bishops' Wars, the Covenanters viewed the 1643 Solemn League and Covenant as a way to preserve their dominance by preventing a Royalist victory in England. Moderate Parliamentarians like Denzil Holles wanted to re-establish what they considered to be a long-standing English legal principle that the king ruled with the consent of Parliament, a principle violated by the period of Personal Rule from 1629 to 1640. They took up arms to uphold the traditional political structure, not destroy it, and as the war progressed, both they and their Scottish co-religionists came to see the Independents and political factions such as the Levellers as a greater threat to the established order than the Royalists.

In 1646, most Parliamentarians assumed military defeat would force Charles I to comply with their terms, but his refusal to make any substantial concessions frustrated allies and opponents alike. He successfully exploited divisions among his opponents to negotiate an alliance with Scots and English Presbyterians which led to the 1648 Second English Civil War. Although quickly suppressed, it created a political grouping within the New Model Army who believed Charles had proved he could not be trusted and only his removal could end the conflict. For the vast majority, including Cromwell, at this stage, it meant abdication rather than execution.

Parliament continued negotiations with Charles but by the beginning of November, the Army had lost its patience. On 10 November, Henry Ireton presented the draft Remonstrance to the Army General Council, which set out a constitutional vision of a state with Charles replaced by an elected monarch. While the Council was initially divided on whether to approve it, they did so on the 15th when it seemed Parliament was about to restore Charles unconditionally. They decided to act after intercepting secret messages from Charles stating any concessions he made were intended only to facilitate his escape.

== Pride's Purge ==
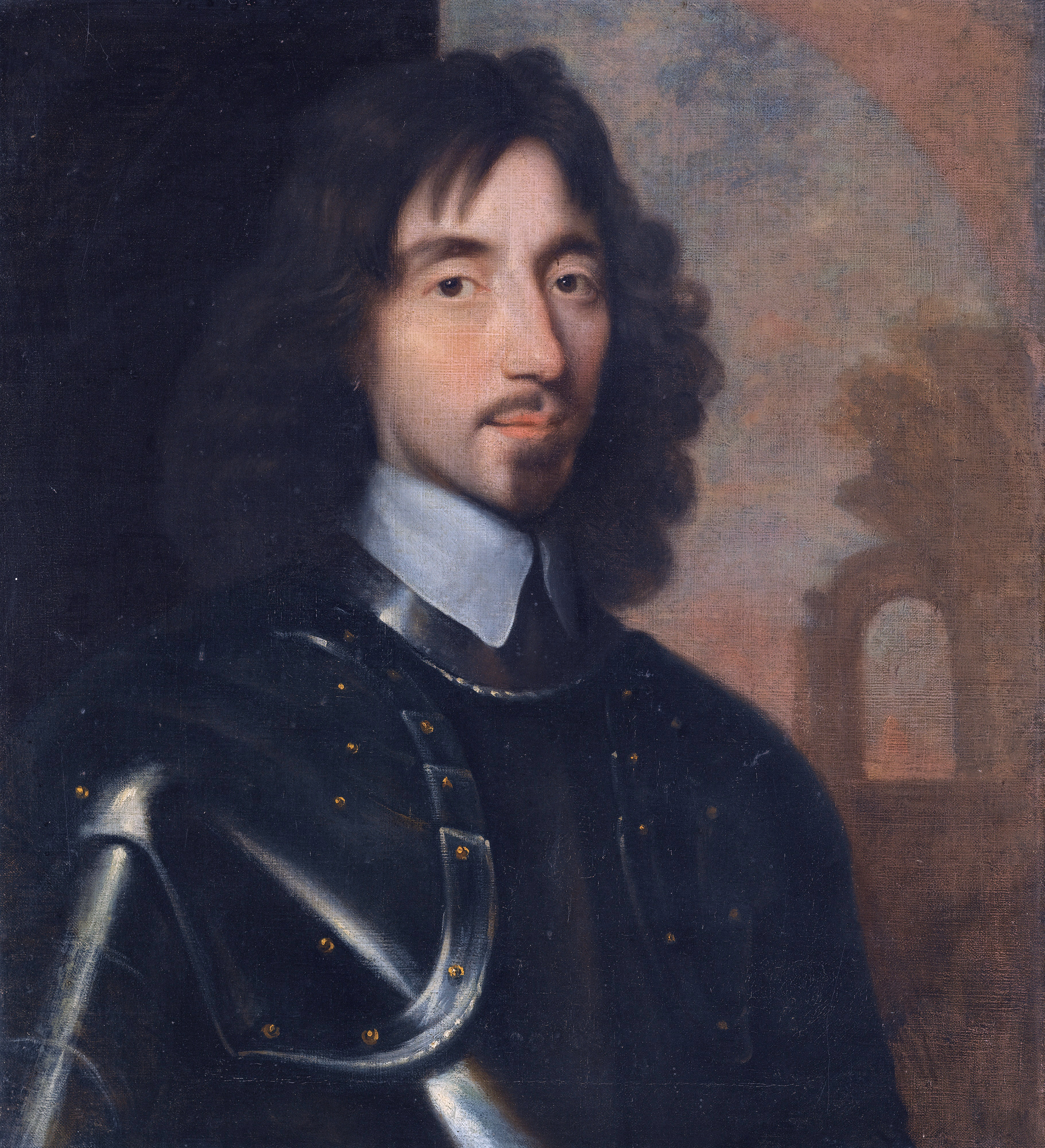
Sir Thomas Fairfax, commander of the New Model Army

On 1 December, Fairfax ordered Charles be taken from his Parliamentary guards on the Isle of Wight, and moved to Hurst Castle on the mainland. The next day, the New Model Army occupied key positions in London, to prevent interference from Presbyterian elements of the London Trained Bands; Fairfax established his headquarters in Whitehall, near the Houses of Parliament.

After an all-day meeting on 5 December, Parliament voted by 129 to 83 to continue negotiating with the king. Next morning, acting under orders from Ireton, (Note: Other sources claim the decision was taken by a sub-committee of six, including Ireton, Pride, and Grey.) a detachment under Colonel Thomas Pride and Sir Hardress Waller ordered the Trained Bands who normally guarded the House to withdraw. They then took up position on the stairs leading into the chamber, supported by cavalry from colonel Nathaniel Rich's Regiment of Horse.

As the MPs arrived, Pride checked their names against a list of those considered enemies of the Army, assisted by Lord Grey of Groby, who helped identify them. The list contained the names of 180 of the 470 eligible members, including all 129 who the day before had voted to continue negotiations with the King. Some prominent opponents, such as Denzil Holles, fled the city.

A total of 140 MPs were refused entry by Pride, 45 of whom were arrested, and held in two inns in the Strand. Many later complained of rough treatment from their New Model guards, who blamed them for their arrears of pay. Most were released in late December, but former Parliamentarian generals William Waller and Richard Browne were held for nearly three years.

This left around 156 members present in London, with another 40 or so absent elsewhere, which became known as the Rump Parliament. (Note: "The indispensable work on the Purge and the number of members affected by it is Underdown, Pride's Purge. Equally essential on the Rump and its membership is Blair Worden, The Rump Parliament (Cambridge, 1974), esp. Appendix A, pp. 387–391; on pp. 391–92 he convincingly revises Underdown's estimate of the number of members physically excluded by the army.") While assumed to be supportive of the Army, this was not necessarily the case; many were horrified by Pride's actions, and more than 80 of those who remained in London refused to attend. The vote to end negotiations with Charles was taken by only 83 MPs.

== Aftermath ==
Between December 1648 to January 1649, Pride's regiment received nearly £8,000 in back pay, substantially more than any other unit in this period. He was later appointed to the tribunal that tried Charles for treason, and signed his death warrant; he became wealthy under the Protectorate, and died in 1658. The Purge eliminated from Parliament those who backed a negotiated settlement with Charles, which included moderate Independents, as well as Presbyterians. Even those who wanted him removed did not necessarily support his execution; this included Fairfax, who refused to take part in his trial, and initially Cromwell, who returned to London from the siege of Pontefract Castle in early December. In return for sparing his life, he hoped Charles would order the Duke of Ormond to end negotiations with the Irish Confederacy, and prevent a new war in Ireland.

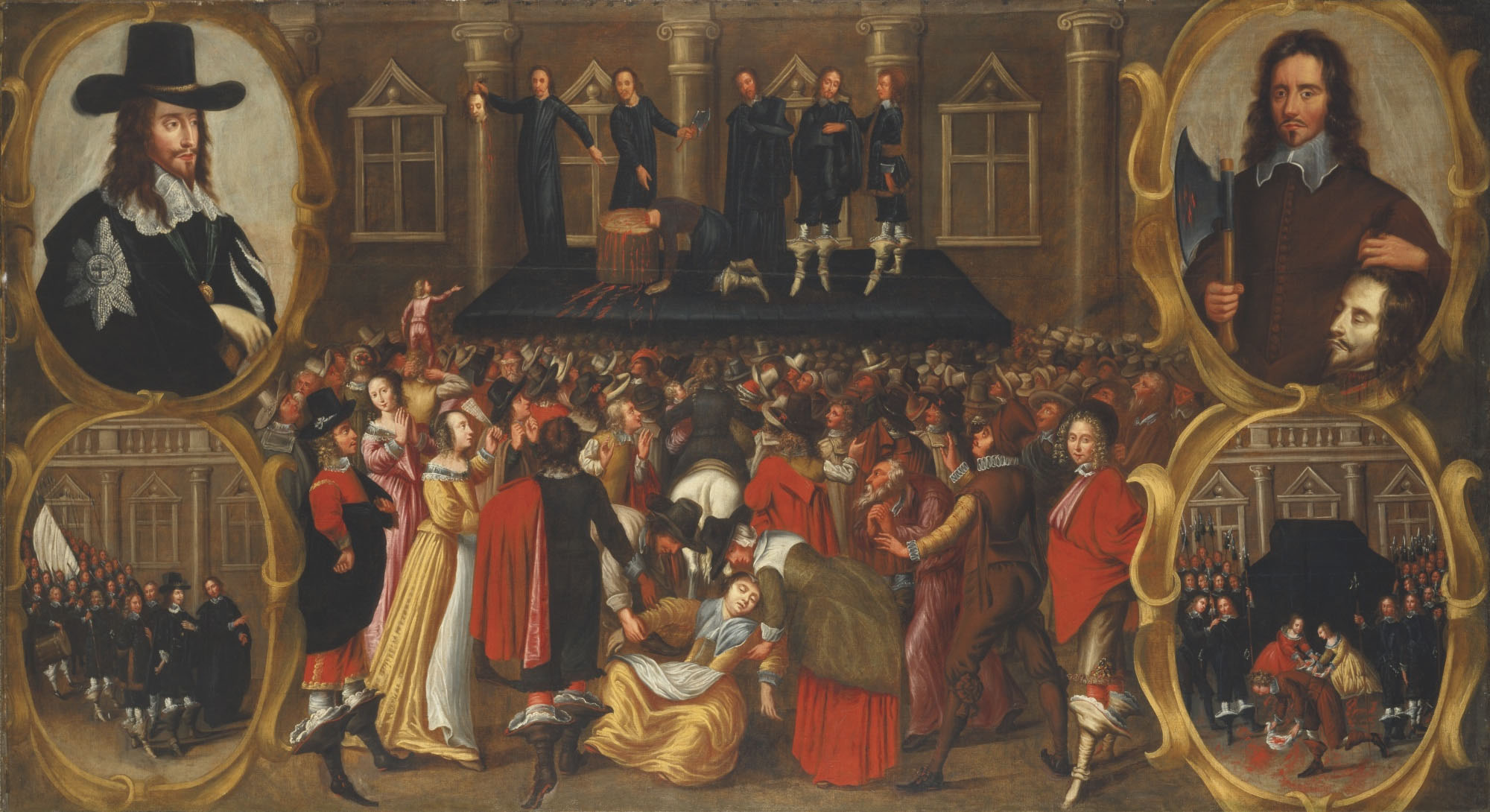
The execution of Charles I, which the Purge made possible

Once it became clear Charles had no intention of doing so, Cromwell became convinced he had to die, stating "we will cut off his head with the crown still on it". On 1 January 1649, the Commons passed an Ordinance to try the king for treason; when this was rejected by the House of Lords, the Commons declared themselves the supreme power in the state, and proceeded with the trial. The trial was backed by republicans like Edmund Ludlow, who argued Charles must die to "appease the wrath of God for the blood shed during the wars", and supported the Purge as the only way to ensure this. They were outnumbered by those who opposed it; only 52 of the 135 appointed judges turned up. A demand by Charles that he be tried by Parliament was blocked by Ireton and Cromwell, as even the Rump Parliament was likely to vote against the death sentence.

Charles was executed on 30 January, but in a society that placed enormous emphasis on the rule of law, the circumstances of his death, and the military coup that preceded it, tainted the subsequent Protectorate from its inception. Intended to remove the Army's opponents from Parliament, the Purge only deepened internal divisions, which continued until it was dissolved in 1653.

== Sources ==
- Ackroyd, Peter (2014). Civil War: The History of England Volume III. Macmillan. ISBN 978-0230706415.
- Bradley, Emily Tennyson (1890). "Grey, Thomas (1623?-1657)" . In Stephen, Leslie; Lee, Sidney (eds.). Dictionary of National Biography. Vol. 23. London: Smith, Elder & Co. pp. 206, 207.
- Carlson, Leland (1942). "A History of the Presbyterian Party from Pride's Purge to the Dissolution of the Long Parliament". Church History. 11 (2): 83–122. doi:10.2307/3160290. JSTOR 3160290. S2CID 159528281.
- Gentles, Ian (2004). "Pride, Thomas, appointed Lord Pride under the protectorate". Oxford Dictionary of National Biography (online ed.). Oxford University Press. doi:10.1093/ref:odnb/22781. (Subscription, Wikipedia Library access or UK public library membership required.)
- Kelsey, Sean (2008) [2004]. "Grey, Thomas, Baron Grey of Groby (1622–1657)". Oxford Dictionary of National Biography (online ed.). Oxford University Press. doi:10.1093/ref:odnb/11563. (Subscription, Wikipedia Library access or UK public library membership required.)
- Ludlow, Edmund (1978). Worden, A.P. (ed.). A Voyce from the Watch Tower. Royal Historical Society. ISBN 978-0901050434.
- Macleod, Donald (Autumn 2009). "The influence of Calvinism on politics" (PDF). Theology in Scotland. XVI (2).
- Macaulay, James (1891). Cromwell Anecdotes. Hodder.
- "Pride's Purge". BCW Project.
- Rees, John (2016). The Leveller Revolution. Verso. ISBN 978-1784783907.
- Royle, Trevor (2004). Civil War: The Wars of the Three Kingdoms 1638–1660 (2006 ed.). Abacus. ISBN 978-0-349-11564-1.
- Scott, David (n.d.). "The Independents and the Long Parliament, 1644-48". History of Parliament.
- Woolrych, Austin (2002). Britain In Revolution. OUP. ISBN 9780198200819.

== Bibliography ==
- Pride’s Purge: Politics in the Puritan Revolution by David Underdown ISBN 0-04-822045-0
