= Denzil Holles, 1st Baron Holles =

English politician and army officer (1598–1680)

The Right Honourable The Lord Holles JP PC
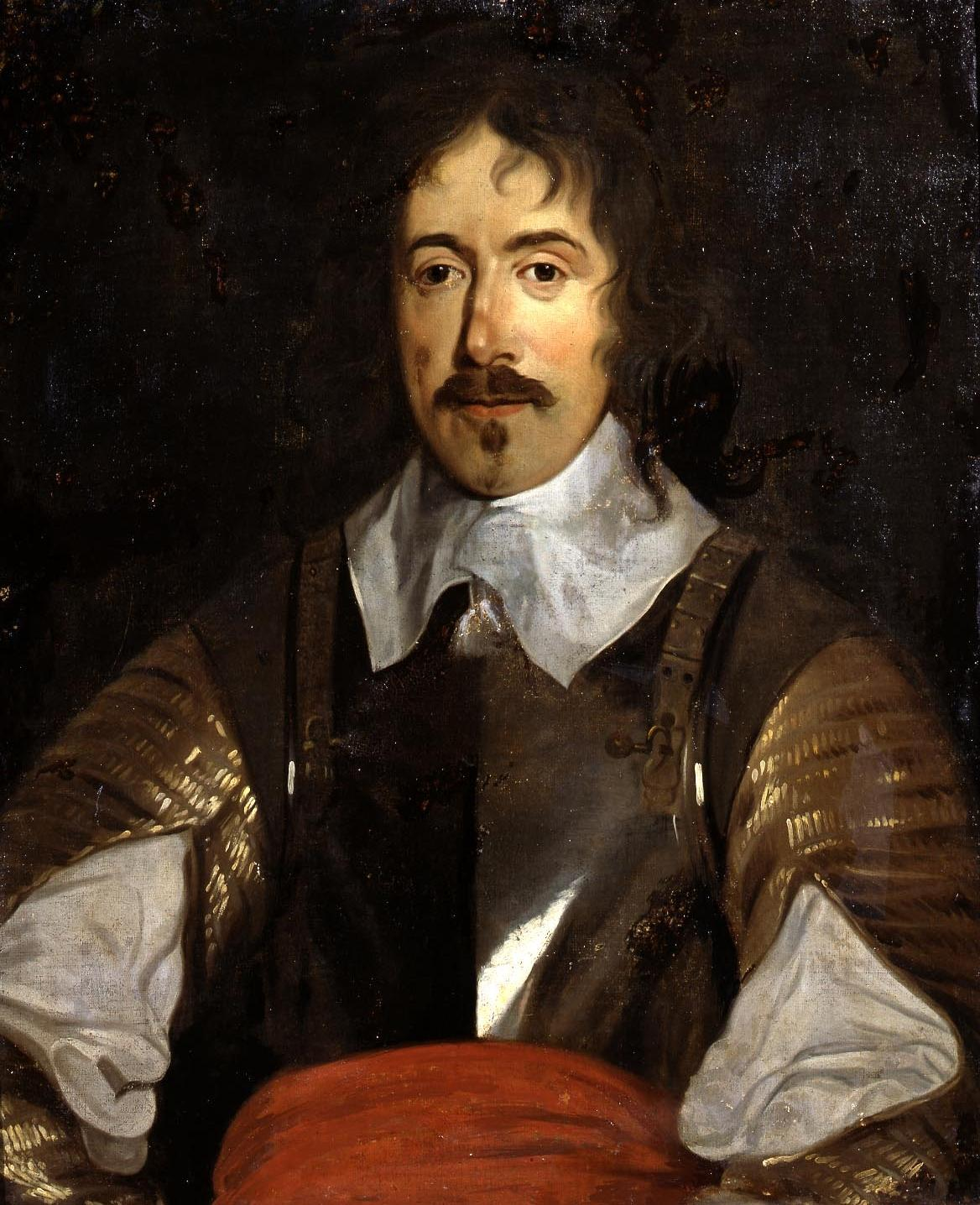
- Portrait by Edward Bower, c. 1640

English Ambassador to France
- In office 1663–1666
- Preceded by: Ralph Montagu
- Succeeded by: Henry Jermyn

Custos Rotulorum of Dorset
- In office 1660–1680
- Preceded by: Francis Cottington
- Succeeded by: John Digby

Privy Counsellor
- In office 1660–1676

Member of Parliament
- In office February 1628 – April 1661
- Preceded by: James Gould
- Succeeded by: John Churchill
- Constituency: Dorchester
- In office February 1624 – March 1625
- Preceded by: Richard Carew
- Succeeded by: Henry Sandys
- Constituency: Mitchell

Personal details
- Born: Denzil Holles; 31 October 1598 London, Kingdom of England
- Died: 17 February 1680 (aged 81) London, Kingdom of England
- Resting place: Westminster Abbey
- Party: Parliamentarian; Whig
- Spouses: Dorothy Ashley (m. 1626; died 1640) Jane Shirley (m. 1642; died 1666) Esther le Lou (m. 1666)
- Children: Francis
- Education: Christ's College, Cambridge
- Occupation: Politician

Military service
- Allegiance: England
- Rank: Colonel
- Unit: Colonel Denzil Holles' Regiment of Foot
- Battles/wars: First English Civil War; Siege of Sherborne Castle; Battle of Edgehill

Colonel Denzil Holles, 1st Baron Holles (31 October 1598 – 17 February 1680) was an English politician and army officer who was one of the Five Members whose attempted arrest by Charles I in January 1642 sparked the First English Civil War. When fighting began in August, Holles raised a Parliamentarian regiment which fought at Edgehill before it was nearly destroyed at Brentford in November 1642. This marked the end of Holles' military career and he became leader of the Parliamentarian 'Peace Party', those who favoured a negotiated settlement with the king. A social conservative from a wealthy family, he came to see political radicals like the Levellers and religious Independents like Oliver Cromwell as more dangerous than the Royalists.

Following victory in the First English Civil War, he led those who opposed Cromwell and his supporters, and was one of the Eleven Members suspended in June 1647. Recalled prior to the Second English Civil War in June 1648, he was excluded again by Pride's Purge in December and went into exile before being allowed home in 1654. After The Restoration of 1660, Charles II made him Baron Holles and Ambassador to France from 1663 to 1666, an appointment that proved unsuccessful.

Holles gradually became part of the Whig opposition, backing the 1673 Test Act and exclusion in 1679 of the Catholic heir, James, Duke of York. He died in February 1680 and was buried in Westminster Abbey. One biographer summarised his career by saying; "...successful in almost everything he privately undertook, (he was) unsuccessful in almost everything he publicly undertook, (while) his passionate parliamentarianism was constantly counter-productive".

== Personal details ==
Arms of Denzil Holles: Ermine, two piles in point sable, a crescent for difference

Born on 31 October 1598, Denzil Holles was the second surviving son of John Holles, 1st Earl of Clare (c. 1564–1637) and his wife Anne Stanhope (1576–1651). He had four siblings who lived into adulthood; Arabella (1594–1631), who married Thomas Wentworth, 1st Earl of Strafford, John Holles, 2nd Earl of Clare (1595–1666), Francis (1604–1622) and Eleanore (died 1681).

In 1626, Holles married Dorothy Ashley; before her death in 1640, they had four children, of whom only Francis (1627–1690) survived into adulthood. He remarried Jane Shirley in 1642, then six months after her death in March 1666, he married for a third time, to Esther le Lou; both marriages were childless.

== Career; prior to 1640 ==
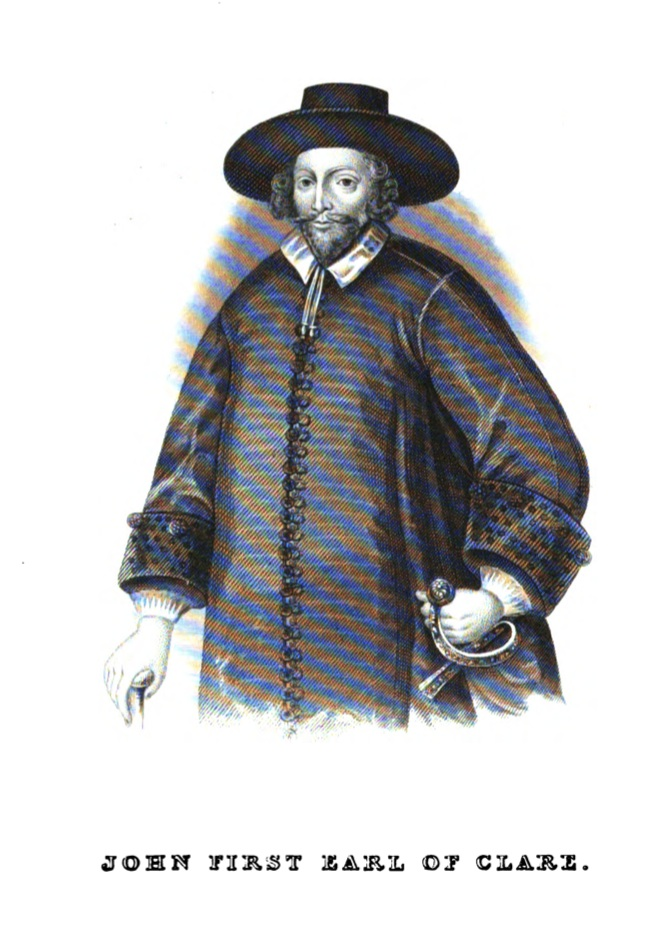
John Holles, 1st Earl of Clare; "a bitter and disappointed father"

John Holles was a wealthy landowner with substantial estates in Nottinghamshire and Cornwall; in 1616, he purchased a barony for the then enormous sum of £10,000 and an earldom for £5,000 in 1624. Despite this expenditure, his political career was largely unfulfilled and Denzil Holles has been described as "the angry younger son of a bitter and disappointed father".

From 1611 to 1615, Holles was educated at Christ's College, Cambridge, where he apparently became friendly with the future Charles I, followed by legal training at Gray's Inn. He spent 1618 and 1619 travelling in Europe and in 1624 was elected MP for Mitchell, close to the family's Cornish estates. He made little impact on this Parliament, which was dissolved when James I died in March 1625.

Holles was a Presbyterian and like many Puritans (Note: "Puritan" meant anyone who wanted to "purify" or reform the Church of England; it included many different sects, Presbyterians being one of the largest but also Baptist, Congregationalists etc.) strongly objected to the pro-Spanish policy pursued by Charles I and his favourite, Buckingham; his elder brother John was the son-in-law of English Protestant mercenary Horace Vere, and served with him in the Eighty Years War, as did his younger brother Francis. After the disastrous Isle of Ré expedition in 1627, Holles wrote to Thomas Wentworth that "since England was England, it received not so dishonourable a blow".

In 1628, he was elected for Dorchester, where his father-in-law had significant influence. He played a prominent role in organising support for the Petition of Right and on 2 March 1629 was one of those who famously forced the Speaker to continue sitting, thus preventing Charles dissolving Parliament. A week later Charles dissolved Parliament, ushering in eleven years of Personal Rule, in which he attempted to regain all the ground lost. Holles, Sir John Eliot and seven others were prosecuted by the Star Chamber and fined; released on bail in October, Holles spent most of the next decade in obscurity.

== Career; 1640 to 1642 ==
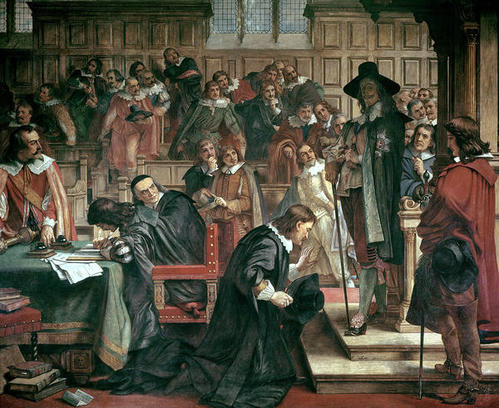
Charles attempts to arrest the Five Members, January 1642; a Victorian era re-imagining

Defeat in the 1639 and 1640 Bishops' Wars forced Charles to recall Parliament and Holles was elected for Dorchester in both the Short and Long Parliaments. Shortly after the House of Commons assembled, it was presented with the Root and Branch petition, signed by 15,000 Londoners; they demanded the expulsion of bishops and an end to "Catholic practices" in the Church of England.

Many viewed these as signs Charles was about to sign an alliance with Catholic Spain, including the French and Venetian ambassadors; this made ending his control over policy vital not just for England but the European Protestant cause in general.

Since respect for the institution of monarchy prevented direct attacks on Charles, the alternative was to prosecute his 'evil counsellors'; in December, Parliament began the impeachment of Laud and Strafford, Holles' former brother-in-law. (Note: Arabella Holles died in 1631) Although Holles viewed Archbishop Laud with hostility, his relationship with Strafford meant he was not involved in his prosecution and tried to prevent his execution in May 1641. Instead he played a prominent part in negotiations with the Scots Covenanters that led to the Treaty of London in August.

The Commons enacted constitutional reforms including the Triennial Act 1640 (16 Cha. 1. c. 1) and the abolition of the Star Chamber, which the bishops ensured were rejected by the House of Lords; when the Commons responded with the Bishops Exclusion Bill, they blocked that too.

Unlike his colleagues, Holles opposed bishops, not for religious reasons but because he objected to their role in the Lords; as they were also responsible for censorship, their removal led to an explosion in the printing of pamphlets, books and sermons, often advocating radical religious and political principles. Many Presbyterians were social conservatives and in June 1641 Holles demanded restrictions to prevent "this great disorder before it came to a higher pitch and degree".

The outbreak of the Irish Rebellion in October brought matters to a head since although both Charles and Parliament supported raising troops to suppress it, neither trusted the other with their control. Holles helped John Pym draft the Grand Remonstrance, presented to Charles on 1 December 1641; this led to the creation of a separate Royalist party, headed by those like Edward Hyde, 1st Earl of Clarendon who felt Parliament was now seeking too much power. Unrest culminated on 23 to 29 December with widespread riots led by the London apprentices and as a result, bishops stopped attending the Parliament.

Southern England; key locations 1642 to 1644

On 30 December, John Williams, Archbishop of York, and eleven other bishops, signed a complaint, disputing the legality of any laws passed by the Lords during their exclusion. Led by Holles, the Commons argued they were inviting the king to dissolve Parliament and thus committing treason; all twelve were arrested.

On 4 January 1642, Charles tried to arrest the Five Members, including Holles, but failed and left London, accompanied by Royalist MPs like Clarendon and members of the Lords; this proved a major tactical mistake, as it gave Pym majorities in both houses.

With both sides preparing for hostilities, Holles was appointed to the Committee of Safety on 4 July 1642, and helped organise the Dorset militia before returning to London to raise a regiment of infantry. In August, he marched to join the main Parliamentarian army assembling at Northampton and on 23 August took part in one of the first skirmishes of the war at Southam, before joining an unsuccessful attack on Sherborne Castle in early September. At Edgehill in October, his regiment helped prevent a Parliamentarian rout, before being largely destroyed just outside London at Brentford on 9 November.

== Career; 1643 to 1659 ==
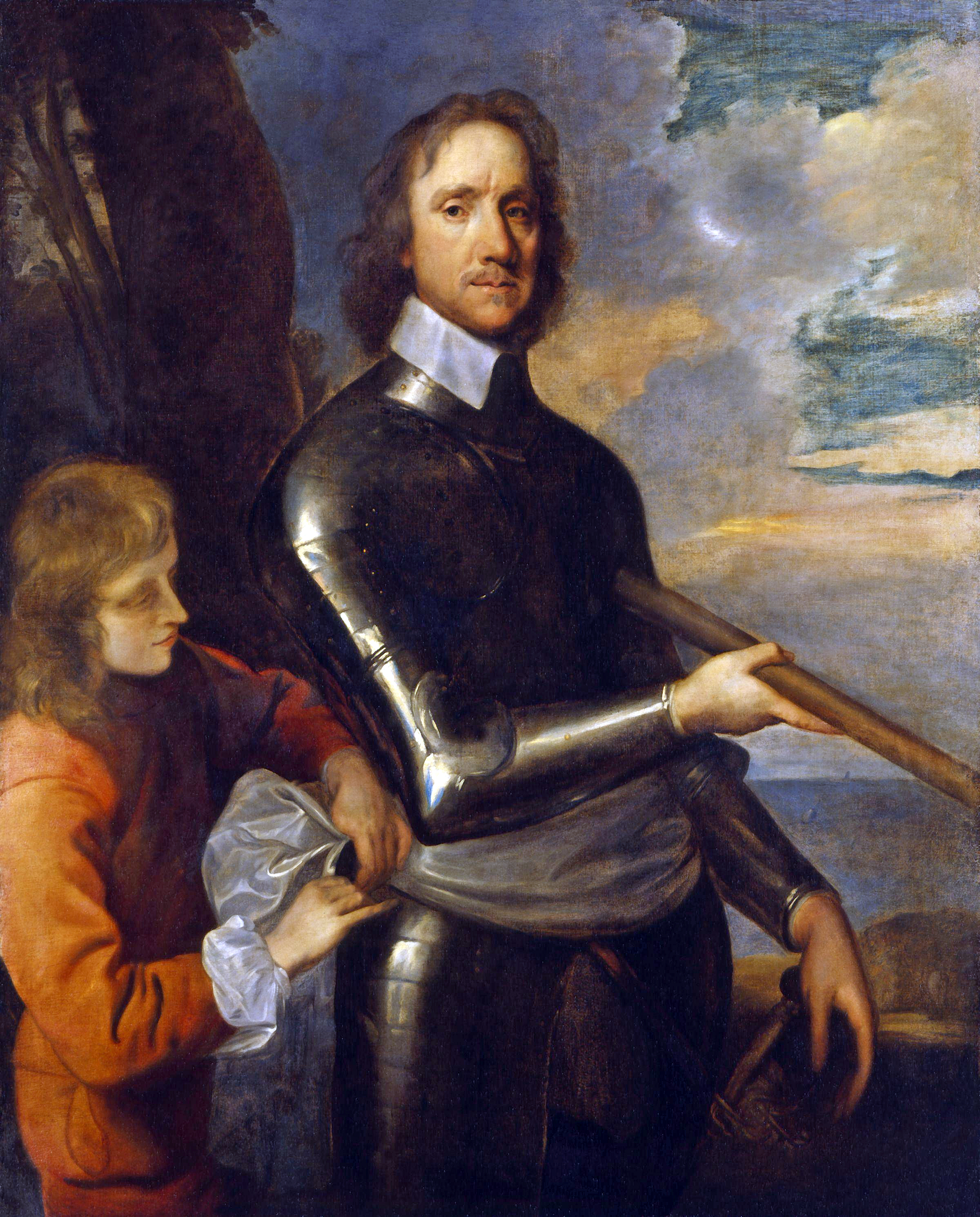
Oliver Cromwell c. 1649; hostility towards Cromwell became a key component of Holles' political philosophy

Like many others, Holles had been reluctant to go to war, which divided his family; his cousin Gervase Holles served in the Royalist army, while another relative, William Holles, was killed outside Oxford in March 1644. Although not present at Brentford, contemporaries suggested the casualties suffered by his regiment were one reason Holles became a leading member of the Parliamentarian 'Peace Party'. This caused a breach with Pym, who believed Charles had to be defeated militarily since he would never voluntarily keep commitments he considered forced on him.

In May 1643, a plot was uncovered organised by Edmund Waller, a leading moderate and cousin of John Hampden and William Waller, commander of the Western Association Army. The conspirators intended to take control of London, arrest Pym and other leaders of the 'War Party', and then negotiate with the king. Although probably aware of the plan, Holles avoided arrest, but the revelation hardened opinion within Parliament against a peace settlement. At the same time, Royalist victories in 1643 made Charles unwilling to negotiate until the war turned against him in late 1644; Holles represented Parliament from November 1644 to January 1645 Uxbridge negotiations, but these made little progress.

The New Model Army formed in April 1645 played a crucial role in defeating Charles, who surrendered in May 1646 to the Scots army outside Newark. However, it was dominated by religious Independents like Oliver Cromwell whom Holles violently opposed, while many members belonged to radical political groups such as the Levellers. As a result, Presbyterians in both England and Scotland viewed the New Model as more dangerous than the Royalists.

The Committee for Both Kingdoms which had directed the war was dissolved in January 1647 and replaced by the Derby House Committee, dominated by Holles and his allies. In return for £400,000, the Scots handed Charles over to Parliament in February, and he was held at Holdenby House, guarded by troops under Colonel Edward Rossiter, a Presbyterian MP who later married Holles' niece Arabella. By March 1647, the New Model was owed more than £3 million in wages and Parliament ordered it to Ireland, stating only those who agreed to go would be paid. When their representatives demanded full payment for all in advance, it was disbanded but the army refused to comply.

In early June, the Army Council removed Charles from Holdenby House and presented him with their terms for a political settlement, which he rejected. Backed by the Presbyterian-dominated London Militia, the moderate majority in Parliament now demanded he be invited to London for further discussions. Fearing he was going to be restored without significant concessions, soldiers commanded by Cromwell and Thomas Fairfax entered the city on 7 August and demanded the removal of those viewed as leaders of the opposition. Known as the Eleven Members, Holles was top of the list and although they were not formally expelled until 26 January, he immediately escaped to Normandy.

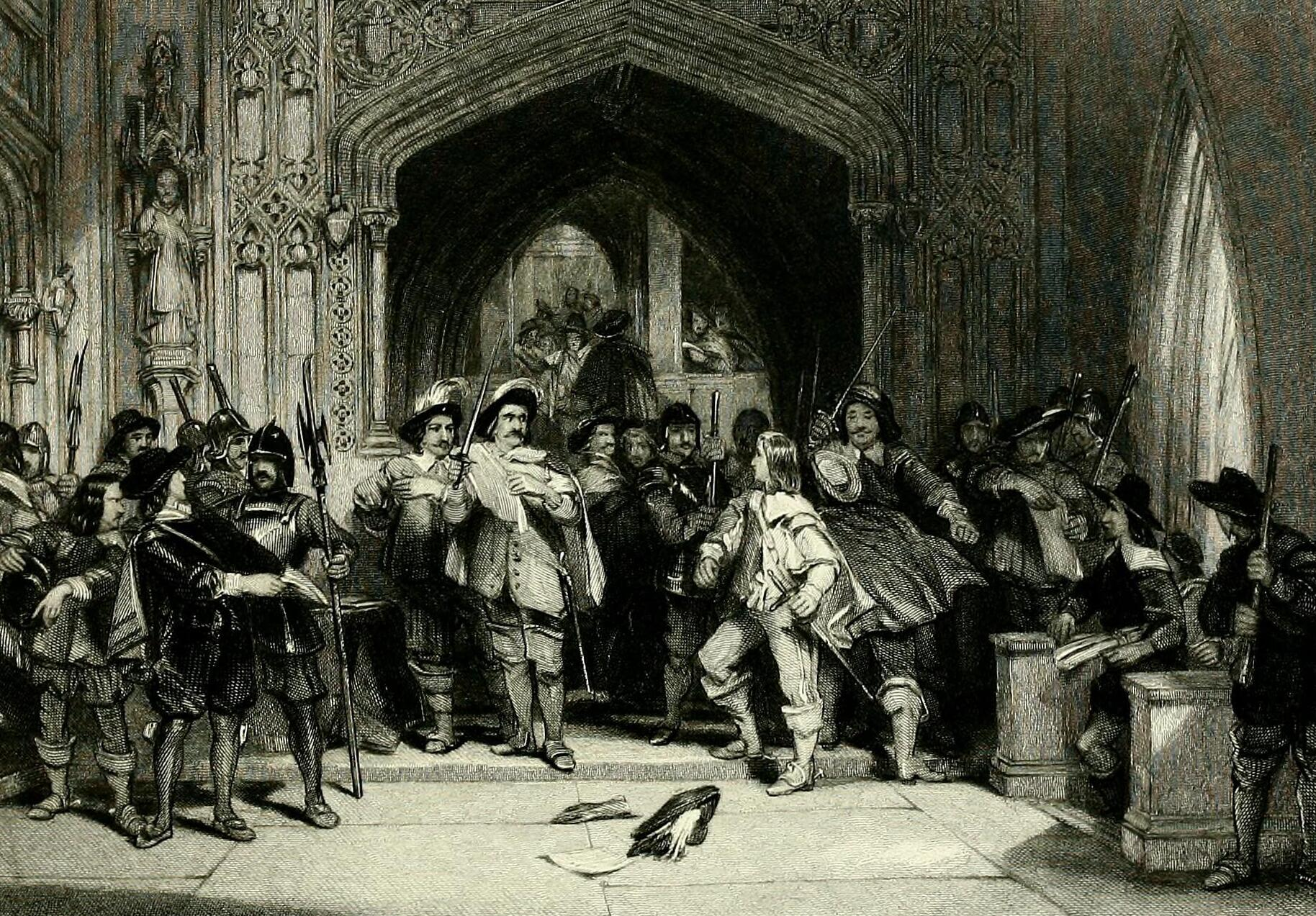
Pride's Purge, December 1648; MPs considered hostile to the army are barred from entry, including Holles

When the Second English Civil War began in April 1648, Parliament reseated the Eleven Members. Holles returned to London in August and although the Royalists were defeated again, he kept negotiating with Charles, who still resisted concessions. When agents intercepted communications from Charles to his supporters telling them to disregard any agreement he might make, the Army issued a "Remonstrance" claiming further talks were pointless. However, on 5 December Holles proposed continuing discussions, which Parliament passed by 129 votes to 83. This resulted in Pride's Purge the next day, when MPs who had voted in favour were arrested by troops as they tried to enter the House; pre-warned, Holles once again escaped to Caen in France.

In exile, Holles refused an offer from Charles II to become his Secretary of State. He did not take part in the 1651 Third English Civil War, although some of his servants were allegedly involved in helping plan a rising in London to coincide with the Scottish invasion. In March 1654, he accepted Cromwell's offer of amnesty for Presbyterian exiles and returned home to Dorset.

== Career; 1660 and after ==
The death of Cromwell in September 1658 and the resignation of his son Richard in May 1659 paralysed the Commonwealth government and ended with The Restoration. In April 1660, Holles was elected for Dorchester to the Convention Parliament and formed part of the delegation sent to The Hague to formally invite Charles to return. One suggestion is this was partly to get him out of the way, due to disagreements within the Convention over the terms; Parliamentarian moderates like Holles wanted to restore the monarchy based on the 1648 Treaty of Newport, while Royalists demanded a return to the 1630s. In the end, most of the 1641 reforms were preserved, but bishops were restored to the Lords and the Church of England.

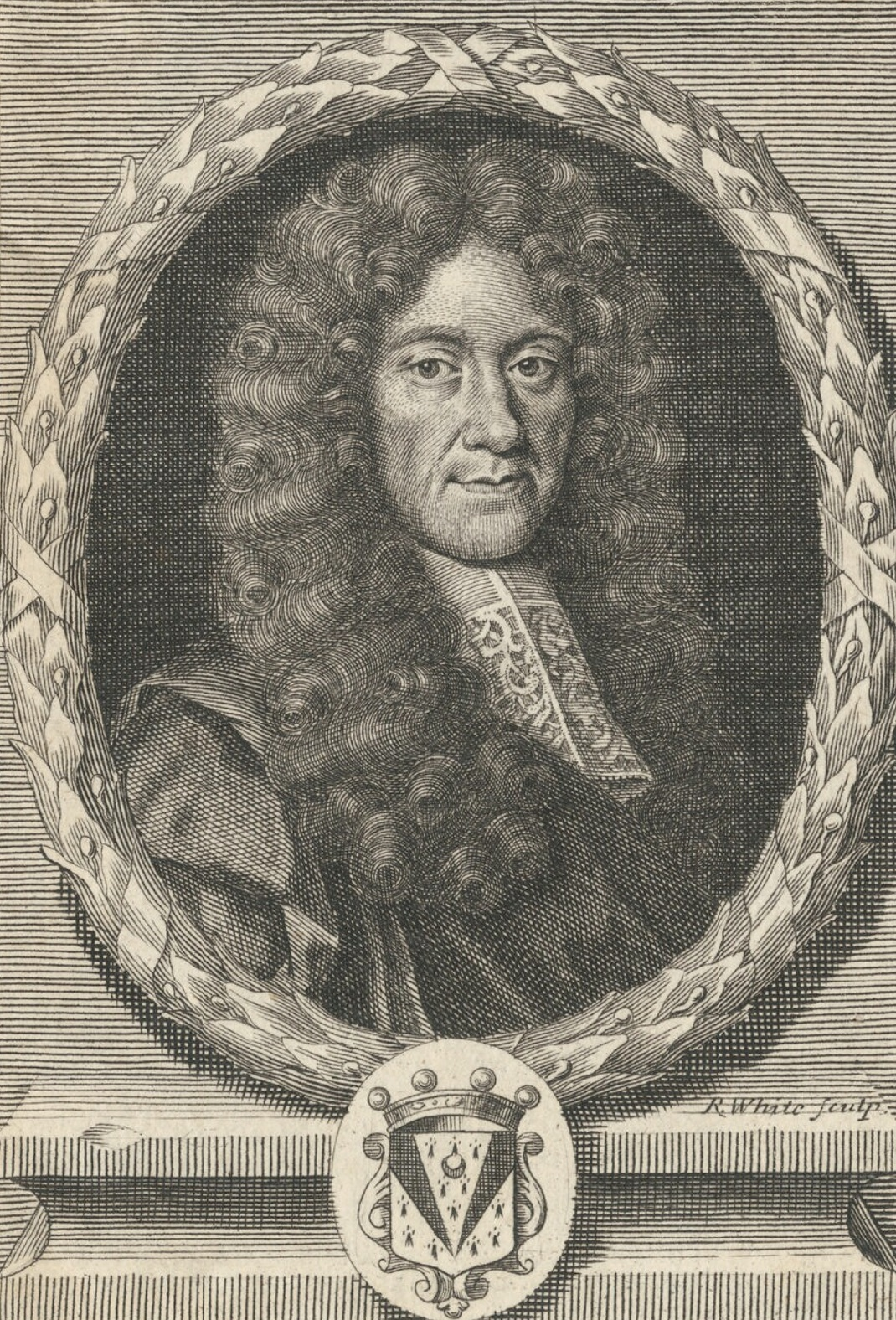
1699 portrait of Holles

Charles appointed Holles to the Privy Council on 5 June and made him Custos Rotulorum of Dorset, while he was also one of the thirty-four commissioners appointed to try the regicides in September and October. Created Baron Holles of Ifield in April 1661, he became a member of the Lords, then Ambassador to France in July 1663; this was not a success, since his insistence on strict protocol infuriated the French and Charles resorted to communicating with Louis XIV through other parties.

He was recalled in January 1666 when France joined the Second Anglo-Dutch War as an ally of the Dutch Republic; on 14 November, the diarist Samuel Pepys recorded "Sir George Carteret tells me...my Lord Holles had been with him and wept to think in what a condition we are fallen." In April 1667, he was part of the English delegation sent to negotiate the Treaty of Breda with the Dutch; talks dragged on until the humiliation of the Dutch Raid on the Medway in June led Clarendon to instruct him to agree to terms in order "to calm people's minds" and "free the king from a burden...he is finding hard to bear".

Despite having been against the war, Clarendon was sentenced to exile for its failure, an act Pepys described as "mighty poor I think, and so doth everyone else". Holles argued against it and his house in Convent Garden became a meeting place for opposition leaders, including his long time associate Lord Shaftesbury. He urged the Lords to vote against the Conventicles Act 1670 and like many in Parliament viewed England's alliance with France and involvement in the 1672 to 1674 Third Anglo-Dutch War as a betrayal of the Protestant cause.

In early 1673, English politics was further destabilised by the prospect of a Catholic monarch when Charles' heir and younger brother James, Duke of York publicly confirmed his conversion, and for the next 18 months, a small group of peers led by Holles and Shaftesbury attacked him in the Lords. This changed in 1675, when fearing Parliament was about to enact new measures against Catholics and English Dissenters, James proposed pardons for anyone convicted under the Conventicles Act. This initially won him backing from Holles, until Charles demanded he withdraw the idea.

Holles then joined Shaftesbury in opposing the 1675 Test Oath Act, which required members to swear an oath of non-resistance to the Crown. He did so on the grounds Charles had no right to require such measures since they were 'contrary to law', but his demands for restrictions on the monarchy were resented by the king. In "The British Constitution Consider'd", published in 1676, Holles argued the prorogation of Parliament for more than a year was contrary to statute, and called for new Parliamentary elections to guarantee accountability. He claimed this would mitigate public concern over Charles' moves towards arbitrary government and French interference in English affairs driven by Louis XIV's desire for 'Universal monarchy'.

As a result, he was dismissed from the Privy Council, before being restored during the Popish Plot in 1679, when Charles sought to reach out to his opponents. During the Exclusion Crisis, a period of political turmoil triggered by attempts to exclude James from the succession, he backed Halifax, who was willing to allow him to succeed with strict limitations, rather than Shaftesbury, who wanted him removed entirely. However, by now he had largely lost his former influence, and in the opinion of one biographer had become "a man out of his time." He died on 17 February 1680 and was buried at Westminster Abbey four days later.

== Publications ==
In addition to "Memoirs", which cover the period up until his first exile in 1647, he wrote a number of pamphlets. Published works include:

- The Case Stated concerning the Judicature of the House of Peers in the Point of Appeals (1675)
- The Case Stated of the Jurisdiction of the House of Lords in the point of Impositions (1676)
- Letter of a Gentleman to his Friend showing that the Bishops are not to be judges in Parliament in Cases Capital (1679)
- Lord Holles his Remains, being a 2nd letter to a Friend concerning the judicature of the Bishops in Parliament...
- A True Relation of the unjust accusation of certain French gentlemen (1671)
- The British Constitution Consider'd (1676)
- Memoirs of Denzil, Lord Holles, from the Year 1641 to 1648 (published 1699, written 1647–1648)

== Sources ==
- Arnold-Baker, Charles (1996). The Companion to British History (2015 ed.). Routledge. ISBN 978-1138928831.
- Battlefield Trust. "Denzil Holles's Regiment of Foot". Brentford and Turnham Green Battlefield Trails.
- BCW Project. "Colonel Denzil Holles' Regiment of Foot". BCW Project. Archived from the original on 25 October 2020.
- Crawford, Patricia (1980). Denzil Holles, 1598–1680: A Study of his Political Career. Royal Historical Society. ISBN 978-0901050526.
- Donagan, Barbara (2008). "Waller, Sir William". Oxford Dictionary of National Biography (online ed.). Oxford University Press. doi:10.1093/ref:odnb/28561. (Subscription, Wikipedia Library access or UK public library membership required.)
- Ferris, John (2010). HOLLES, Denzil (1598-1680), of Dorchester Friary, Dorset and Damerham, Wilts in The History of Parliament: the House of Commons 1604–1629. CUP.
- Firth, Charles Harding (1891). "Holles, Denzil" . In Lee, Sidney (ed.). Dictionary of National Biography. Vol. 27. London: Smith, Elder & Co. pp. 162–166.
- Geyl, Pieter (1939). Orange & Stuart 1641–1672 (1969 ed.). Oosthoek's. ISBN 1842122266.
- Grayling, AC (2017). Democracy and its crisis. Oneworld Publications. ISBN 978-1-78607-289-4.
- Harris, Tim (2014). Rebellion: Britain's First Stuart Kings, 1567–1642. OUP. ISBN 978-0-19-920900-2.
- Harris, Tim (2006). Restoration; Charles II and his kingdoms. Penguin. ISBN 9780140264654.
- Helms, MW; Crosette, JS (1983). Rossiter, Edward (1618-69), of Somerby, Lincs in The History of Parliament: the House of Commons 1660-1690. Boydell & Brewer. Archived from the original on 6 May 2021.
- Hutton, Ronald (2003). The Royalist War Effort 1642–1646. Routledge. ISBN 9780415305402.
- Judge. "Colonel Denzil Holles' Regiment of Foot". Archived from the original on 2 April 2015.
- Malcolm, Joyce Lee (1999). "Doing No Wrong: Law, Liberty, and the Constraint of Kings". British Studies. 38 (2): 161–186. doi:10.1086/386188. JSTOR 175954. S2CID 144810765.
- Manganiello, Stephen (2004). The Concise Encyclopedia of the Revolutions and Wars of England, Scotland, and Ireland, 1639–1660. Scarecrow Press. ISBN 978-0810851009.
- Mansfield, Andrew (2021). "The First Earl of Shaftesbury's Resolute Conscience and Aristocratic Constitutionalism" (PDF). The Historical Journal. 65 (4): 969–991. doi:10.1017/s0018246x21000662. S2CID 239706680.
- Marsh, Bethany (2020). "A War of Words; politics, propaganda and censorship during the Civil Wars". History Today. 70 (B).
- Miller, John (1978). James II; A study in kingship. Menthuen. ISBN 978-0413652904.
- Morrill, John (2004). "Holles, Denzil, first Baron Holles". Oxford Dictionary of National Biography (online ed.). Oxford University Press. doi:10.1093/ref:odnb/13550. (Subscription, Wikipedia Library access or UK public library membership required.)
- OLL Liberty. "Shaftesbury opposes the nonresisting test bill before the House of Lords as a step towards 'absolute and arbitrary' government (1675)". OLL Liberty Fund.
- Pepys. "Wednesday 14 November 1666".
- Pepys, Samuel (1983). Latham, R; Mathews, W (eds.). Diary of Samuel Pepys, Volume VIII. Bell & Hyman. ISBN 978-0713515510.
- The Eleven Members. "The Eleven Members". BCW Project.
- Pride's Purge. "Pride's Purge". BCW Project.
- Rees, John (2016). The Leveller Revolution. Verso. ISBN 978-1784783907.
- Royle, Trevor (2004). Civil War: The Wars of the Three Kingdoms 1638–1660. Abacus. ISBN 978-0-349-11564-1.
- Seddon, P.R (2004). "Holles, John, first earl of Clare". Oxford Dictionary of National Biography (online ed.). Oxford University Press. doi:10.1093/ref:odnb/13554. (Subscription, Wikipedia Library access or UK public library membership required.)
- Spurr, John (1998). English Puritanism, 1603-1689. Palgrave. ISBN 978-0333601884.
- Wedgwood, C.V. (1958). The King's War, 1641–1647 (1983 ed.). Penguin Classics. ISBN 978-0-14-006991-4.
- Westminster Abbey. "Holles Family; Francis (1604-1622)". Westminster Abbey.
- Wood, AC (1936). "The Holles Family". Transactions of the Royal Historical Society. 19: 145–165. doi:10.2307/3678690. JSTOR 3678690. S2CID 161655080.

== Bibliography ==
- Samuel Rawson Gardiner, History of England (1883–1884), and History of the Great Civil War (1893)
- Lord Clarendon, History of the Rebellion, edited by William Dunn Macray
- Yorke, Philip Chesney (1911). "Holles, Denzil Holles, Baron" . Encyclopædia Britannica. Vol. 13 (11th ed.). pp. 611–614.

Parliament of England
Preceded by John Holles; John Sawle	Member of Parliament for Mitchell; 1624; With: John Sawle	Succeeded by Henry Sandys; Sir John Smith
Preceded by William Whiteway; Nicholas Bulstrode	Member of Parliament for Dorchester; 1628–1629; With: John Hill	Parliament suspended until 1640
Vacant Parliament suspended since 1629	Member of Parliament for Dorchester; 1640–1648; With: Denis Bond	Succeeded by Denis Bond
Honorary titles
Preceded by The Lord Cottington jointly with The Lord Cottington 1641–1646 and The Earl of Bristol 1642–1646	Custos Rotulorum of Dorset; 1641–1646, 1660–1680	Succeeded by The Earl of Bristol
Peerage of England
New creation	Baron Holles; 1661–1680	Succeeded by Francis Holles
