= William Ewer (banker) =

English merchant, banker and politician (1720–1789)

Governor of the Bank of England
- In office 1781–1783
- Preceded by: Daniel Booth
- Succeeded by: Richard Neave

Member of Parliament for Dorchester
- In office 1765–1789 Co-leading with John Damer, later George Damer
- Preceded by: John Damer; Thomas Foster
- Succeeded by: George Damer; Thomas Ewer

Personal details
- Born: 1720 Hertfordshire, England
- Died: 23 June 1789 (aged 68–69)
- Occupation: Merchant, banker

William Ewer (c. 1720 – 23 June 1789) was an English merchant, banker and politician who sat in the House of Commons between 1765 and 1789.

Ewer was the son of Henry Ewer of The Lea, Hertfordshire and his wife Hester Vandeput, daughter of Sir Peter Vandeput (1641- 1709). He and his brother Thomas Ewer inherited the grocery business of their uncle Charles Ewer MP in 1742, and continued trading at his premises in London. They were also merchants trading with Turkey.

Ewer became a director of the Bank of England in 1763, holding this post until his death. He was returned unopposed as member of parliament for Dorchester on the interest of his cousin Lord Shaftesbury, governor of the Levant Company, in a by-election in 1765. He retained the seat in contests in the 1768 general election and the 1774 general election. He was appointed Deputy Governor of the Bank of England in 1779.

Ewer was returned unopposed as MP for Dorchester in 1780 and in 1781 succeeded Daniel Booth as Governor of the Bank of England. In parliament he was active in advising the government on the current loan and spoke explaining and defending it. He also spoke on the renewal of the Bank's charter. He was succeeded as Governor by Richard Neave in 1783. Ewer's tenure as Governor occurred during the Bengal bubble crash (1769–1784).

Ewer was one of the St. Alban's Tavern group, which tried to bring together William Pitt the Younger and Charles James Fox. He was re-elected MP for Dorchester in the 1784 general election. As well as banking he spoke on behalf of the mercantile interest.

Ewer died on 23 June 1789.

== See also ==
- Chief Cashier of the Bank of England

Parliament of Great Britain
Preceded by John Damer; Thomas Foster	Member of Parliament for Dorchester; 1765–1789; With: John Damer; Hon. George Damer	Succeeded by Hon. George Damer; Thomas Ewer
Government offices
Preceded by Daniel Booth	Governor of the Bank of England; 1781–1783	Succeeded by Richard Neave
