= Cropley Ashley-Cooper, 6th Earl of Shaftesbury =

British politician (1768–1851)

The Right Honourable The Earl of Shaftesbury
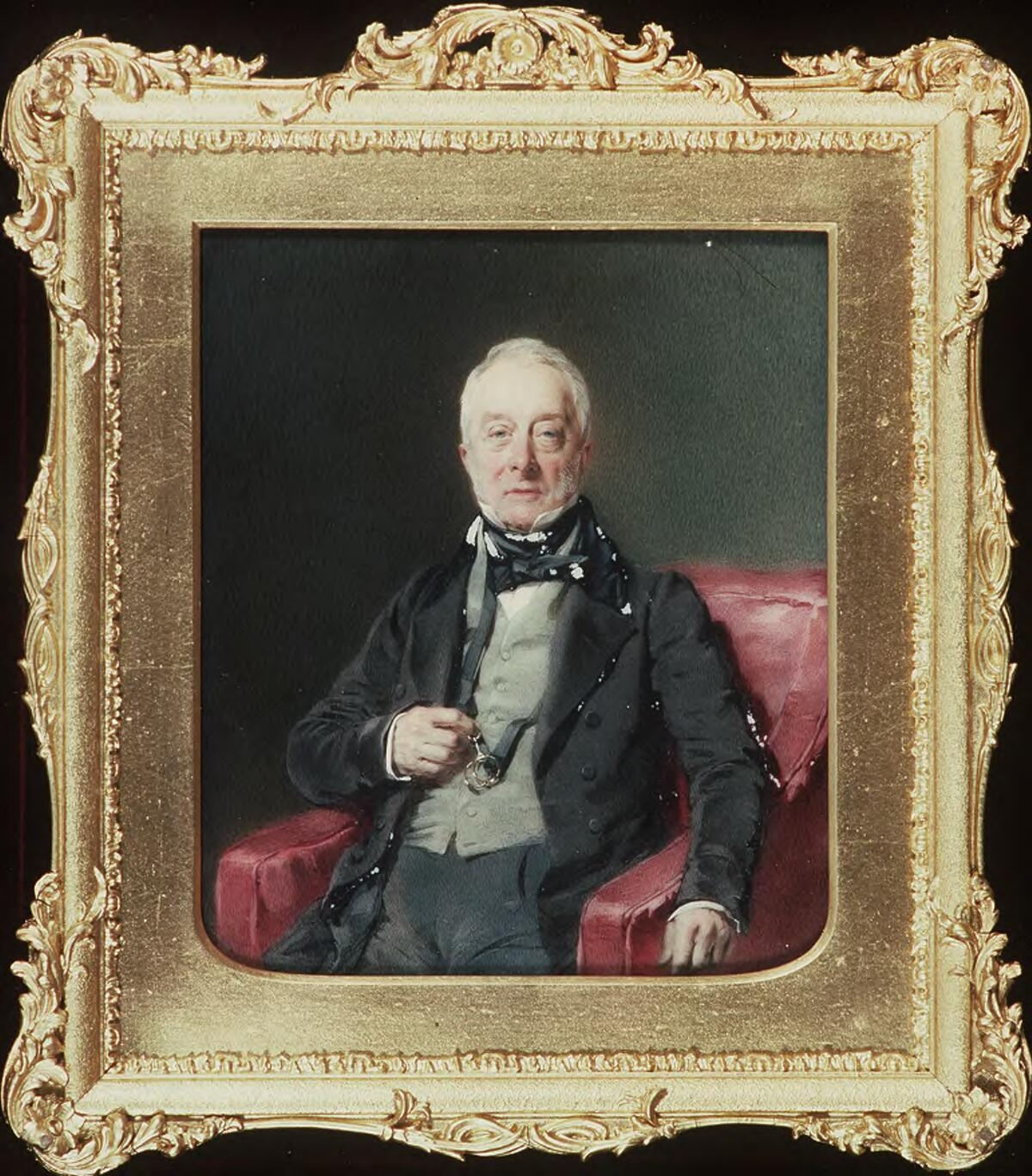

Member of the British Parliament for Dorchester
- In office 30 January 1790 – 11 June 1790
- In office 14 April 1791 – 14 May 1811

Personal details
- Born: 21 December 1768
- Died: 2 June 1851 (aged 82)
- Spouse: Lady Anne Spencer
- Children: 10
- Parents: Anthony Ashley Cooper, 4th Earl of Shaftesbury (father); Mary Bouverie (mother)

Cropley Ashley-Cooper, 6th Earl of Shaftesbury (21 December 1768 – 2 June 1851), styled The Honourable Cropley Ashley-Cooper until 1811, was a British politician. He was the father of the social reformer Anthony Ashley-Cooper, 7th Earl of Shaftesbury.

== Background ==
Shaftesbury was a younger son of Anthony Ashley-Cooper, 4th Earl of Shaftesbury, by his second wife Mary, daughter of Jacob Bouverie, 1st Viscount Folkestone. He was educated at Winchester College and Christ Church, Oxford.

== Political career ==
Shaftesbury was elected Member of Parliament for Dorchester in 1790, a seat he held until 1811. The latter year he succeeded his elder brother in the earldom and entered the House of Lords, in which he served as Chairman of Committees.

== Family ==
Lord Shaftesbury married Lady Anne, daughter of George Spencer, 4th Duke of Marlborough, on 10 December 1796. They had nine children:

- Lady Harriet Anne Ashley-Cooper married Henry Lowry-Corry and was the mother of Montagu Corry, 1st Baron Rowton
- Lady Caroline Mary Ashley-Cooper
- Charlotte Barbara Ashley-Cooper
- Anthony Ashley-Cooper, 7th Earl of Shaftesbury
- Anthony William Ashley-Cooper
- Anthony Henry Ashley-Cooper
- Anthony John Ashley-Cooper, who married Julia Conyers, heiress of Henry John Conyers of Copped Hall
- Anthony Francis Ashley-Cooper (1810–1825), killed in a pugilistic contest while at Eton.
- Anthony Lionel Ashley-Cooper

Lord Shaftesbury died in June 1851, aged 82, and was succeeded in the earldom by his son, Anthony, the noted social reformer.

Parliament of Great Britain
Preceded by George Damer; Thomas Ewer	Member of Parliament for Dorchester; 1790; With: George Damer	Succeeded by George Damer; Francis Fane
Preceded by George Damer; Francis Fane	Member of Parliament for Dorchester; 1791–1801; With: Francis Fane	Succeeded by Parliament of the United Kingdom
Parliament of the United Kingdom
Preceded by Parliament of Great Britain	Member of Parliament for Dorchester; 1801–1811; With: Francis Fane 1801–1807; Robert Williams 1807–1811	Succeeded by Robert Williams; Charles Henry Bouverie
Political offices
Preceded by Joseph Hunt	Clerk of the Deliveries of the Ordnance; 1804–1806	Succeeded by James Martin Lloyd
Preceded by James Martin Lloyd	Clerk of the Deliveries of the Ordnance; 1807	Succeeded by Thomas Thoroton
Preceded by William Wellesley-Pole	Clerk of the Ordnance; 1807–1811	Succeeded by Robert Plumer Ward
Peerage of England
Preceded by Anthony Ashley-Cooper	Earl of Shaftesbury; 1811–1851	Succeeded by Anthony Ashley-Cooper
