= Gaussen =

Gaussen is a surname. Notable people by that name include:

- François Gaussen (1790–1863), Swiss Protestant divine.
- Henri Gaussen (1891-1981), French botanist and biogeographer.
- Robert Gaussen, former Produce and Grocery Industry Ombudsman appointed by the Australian Government.
- Peter Gaussen, governor of the Bank of England from 1777 to 1779.
