= John Damer (1720–1783) =

English politician

John Damer (27 October 1720 – 1783) was an English country landowner and politician who sat in the House of Commons from 1762 to 1780.

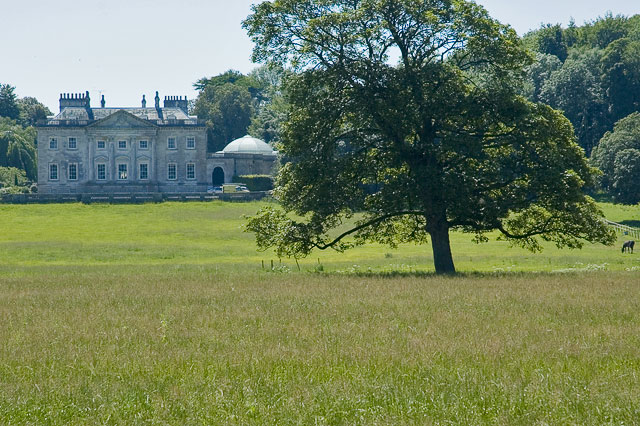
Winterborne, Came House

Damer was the second son of Joseph Damer MP of Winterborne Came, and his wife Mary Churchill, daughter of John Churchill of Henbury, Dorset, and was born on 27 October 1720. Damer entered Trinity College, Dublin in March 1737. He married Martha Rush, daughter of Samuel Rush of Benhall, Suffolk on 15 April 1745. By 1751 his brother Joseph Damer, Lord Milton had acquired property at Milton Abbey and John Damar was left in possession of Winterborne Came. In 1754 he commissioned Francis Cartwright of Blandford to design and build Came House at Winterborne.

Damer was returned unopposed as Member of Parliament for Dorchester in place of his brother Joseph at a by-election on 7 May 1762. He was re-elected MP in a contest in 1768 and again in 1774. He was generally in opposition and as his cousin, also John Damer, was also in the house, it is not clear which were his speeches. Damer stood down at the 1780 general election to make way for his nephew Hon. George Damer.

Damer died on 26 December 1783. He and his wife Mary had no children.

Parliament of Great Britain
Preceded by The Lord Milton; Thomas Foster	Member of Parliament for Dorchester; 1762–1780; With: Thomas Foster 1762-1765; William Ewer 1765-1780	Succeeded by Hon. George Damer; William Ewer
