= Francis Fane of Spettisbury =

British politician

Francis Fane (5 December 1752 – 10 November 1813) of Spettisbury, near Blandford, Dorset, was a British Member of Parliament.

== Life ==
Francis Fane was born on 5 December 1752, the third son of Henry Fane of Wormsley and his third wife Charlotte, daughter of Richard Luther of Miles, near Ongar in Essex. He was educated at Corpus Christi College, Cambridge, graduating in 1768.

He was Member of Parliament for the constituency of Lyme Regis from 11 June 1777 until 1780 and for Dorchester in the Parliaments of 1790, 1796, 1802, 1806.

== Family ==
Fane married Anne Cooke, who succeeded to her father's estates in Somerset and Dorset in 1777. They had no children.

== Notes ==
Parliament of Great Britain
Preceded by Henry Fane; Hon. Henry Fane	Member of Parliament for Lyme Regis; 1777–1780; With: Hon. Henry Fane	Succeeded by David Robert Michel
Preceded by Hon. George Damer; Hon. Cropley Ashley	Member of Parliament for Dorchester; 1791–1800; With: Hon. George Damer 1790–1791; Hon. Cropley Ashley 1791–1800	Succeeded by Parliament of the United Kingdom
Parliament of the United Kingdom
Preceded by Parliament of Great Britain	Member of Parliament for Dorchester; 1801–1807; With: Hon. Cropley Ashley	Succeeded by Hon. Cropley Ashley; Robert Williams
