= George Damer, 2nd Earl of Dorchester =

British politician (1746–1808)

The Right Honourable The Earl of Dorchester PC, PC (Ire)
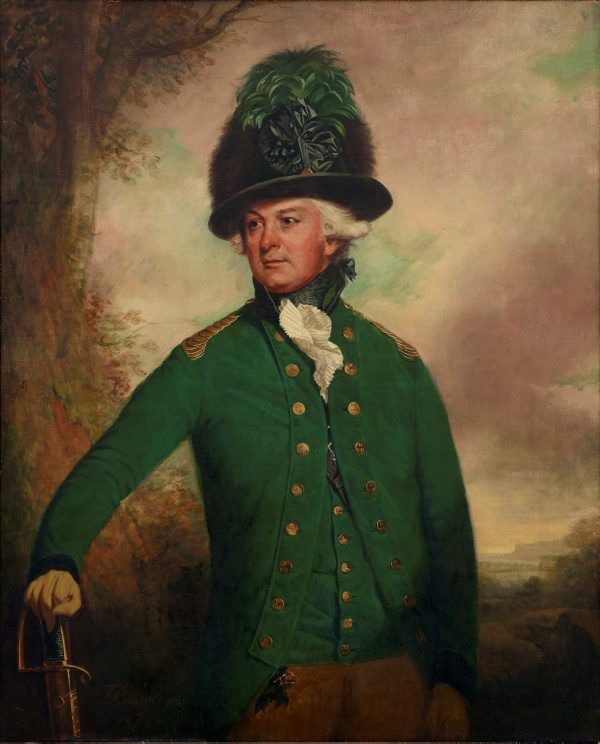
- Portrait by Thomas Beach, 1795

Chief Secretary for Ireland
- In office 1794–1795
- Monarch: George III
- Prime Minister: William Pitt the Younger
- Preceded by: Sylvester Douglas
- Succeeded by: Thomas Pelham

Personal details
- Born: 28 March 1746
- Died: 7 March 1808 Park Lane, London
- Education: Trinity College, Cambridge

George Damer, 2nd Earl of Dorchester, PC, PC (Ire) (28 March 1746 – 7 March 1808), styled Viscount Milton between 1792 and 1798, was a British politician who served as Chief Secretary for Ireland from 1794 to 1795.

== Background ==
Dorchester was the second son of Joseph Damer, 1st Earl of Dorchester. He was educated at Eton and Trinity College, Cambridge, where he took his MA in 1767.

== Political career ==
Lord Dorchester sat as Member of Parliament for Cricklade between 1768 and 1774, for Anstruther Burghs between 1778 and 1780, for Dorchester between 1780 and 1790 and for Malton between 1792 and 1798. He also represented Naas in the Irish House of Commons between 1795 and 1798 and served under William Pitt the Younger as Chief Secretary for Ireland between 1794 and 1795. He was sworn of the British Privy Council in 1794 and of the Irish Privy Council in 1795.

He succeeded his father in the earldom on 12 January 1798, his elder brother having committed suicide in 1776, and entered the House of Lords. On 25 June 1798, he was appointed colonel of the Dorset Militia in succession to Lord Rivers, but resigned in late 1799. Lord Dorchester was also Lord Lieutenant of Dorset, and colonel of the Dorsetshire Yeomanry Cavalry, from 1803 to 1808.

== Personal life ==
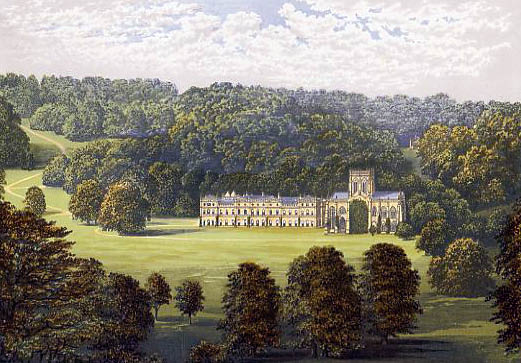
Milton Abbey in the late 1800s

Lord Dorchester was a great favourite of the royal family who occasionally stayed at his estate at Milton Abbey near Weymouth. He died unmarried in Park Lane, London, in March 1808, aged 61, when his titles became extinct. His estates were inherited by his sister Lady Caroline Damer, and on her death in 1828 by their Dawson cousins, who assumed the additional name of Damer. John Dawson-Damer, 2nd Earl of Portarlington, inherited the large but encumbered Irish properties, and his younger brothers Henry and George Dawson-Damer received respectively the estates of Milton Abbey and Came.

Parliament of Great Britain
Preceded by Thomas Gore; Arnold Nesbitt	Member of Parliament for Cricklade; 1768–1774; With: Sir Robert Fletcher	Succeeded by William Earle; Arnold Nesbitt
Preceded by Philip Anstruther	Member of Parliament for Anstruther Burghs; 1778–1780	Succeeded by Sir John Anstruther, Bt
Preceded by John Damer; William Ewer	Member of Parliament for Dorchester; 1780–1791; With: William Ewer 1780–1789; Thomas Ewer 1789–1790; Cropley Ashley 1790; Francis Fane 1790–1791	Succeeded by Francis Fane; Cropley Ashley
Preceded by Edmund Burke; William Weddell	Member of Parliament for Malton; 1792–1798; With: Edmund Burke 1792–1794; Richard Burke 1794–1795; William Baldwin 1795–1798	Succeeded by William Baldwin; Bryan Cooke
Parliament of Ireland
Preceded by Lord Naas; Sir James Bond, Bt	Member of Parliament for Naas; 1795–1798; With: Sir James Bond, Bt 1795–1797; Vacant 1797–1798	Succeeded by Vacant; Francis Hely-Hutchinson
Military offices
Preceded by The Lord Rivers	Colonel of the Dorset Militia; 1798–1799	Succeeded by Richard Bingham
New regiment	Colonel of the Dorsetshire Yeomanry Cavalry; 1803–1808	Succeeded by James Frampton
Political offices
Preceded by Sylvester Douglas	Chief Secretary for Ireland; 1794–1795	Succeeded by Thomas Pelham
Honorary titles
Preceded by The Lord Rivers	Lord Lieutenant of Dorset; 1803–1808	Succeeded by The Earl Digby
Peerage of Great Britain
Preceded by Joseph Damer	Earl of Dorchester; 1798–1808	Extinct
