= Sir Henry Hoghton, 7th Baronet =

British politician

Sir Henry Philip Hoghton, 7th Baronet (1768–1835) was a British politician who sat in the House of Commons from 1795 to 1802.

Hoghton was the elder son of Sir Henry Hoghton, 6th Baronet and his second wife Fanny Booth, daughter of Daniel Booth of Hutton Hall, Essex, Governor of the Bank of England, and was born on 12 June 1768. He was educated at Charterhouse School from 1784 to 1785 and was admitted at St. John’s College, Cambridge in 1786. He was High Sheriff of Lancashire in 1794-5 and succeeded his father in the baronetcy on 9 March 1795. He married Susannah Parker, widow of Thomas Townley Parker of Cuerden Hall and daughter of Peter Brooke of Astley Hall on 13 November 1797.

Hoghton replaced his father as Member of Parliament for Preston at an uncontested by-election on 26 March 1795. The Earl of Derby sponsored his election to Brooks on 14 November 1795. He was returned as MP for Preston in the 1796 general election after a contest. He did not speak in parliament and gave up his seat at the 1802 general election.

Hoghton was Colonel of the 3rd Royal Lancashire Militia from 1797 to 1803. He died on 27 November 1835.

== Bibliography ==
- Obituary The Gentleman's Magazine, Volumes 159-160 p 312.

Parliament of Great Britain
Preceded by William Cunliffe Shawe; Sir Henry Hoghton, Bt	Member of Parliament for Preston; 1795–1802; With: William Cunliffe Shawe; Lord Stanley	Succeeded by Lord Stanley; John Horrocks
Baronetage of England
Preceded by Henry Hoghton	Baronet (of Hoghton Tower); 1795-1835	Succeeded by Henry Bold-Hoghton
