= Limerick Rake =

Irish ballad

"Limerick Rake" is a traditional Irish song whose composer is disputed. The lyrics are set to the tune of an unknown earlier song. The lyrics likely date to the late 18th century, as attested by the use of the place-name "Castletown Conyers" (which was still seen referred to by its former name "Castletown McEnyry" as late as 1763) and the mention of the deaths of Lord Devonshire (1764) and John Damer (1776).

The song appeared in Colm Ó Lochlainn's 1939 publication Irish Street Ballads and has been recorded by a number of notable artists.

The song's narrator is a young rake whose parents rebuked him. He is literate and relatively well-educated, but he is more interested in girls than working. He claims to not be interested in riches, pointing out that wealthy men and misers are also mortal, and mentioning examples of men whose gold did not prevent their deaths.

== Lyrics ==
I am a young fellow that's easy and bold;
In Castletown Conyers (Note: A town in County Limerick, situated five km south of Ballingarry, on the road from Rathkeale to Charleville.) I'm very well known.
In Newcastle West I spent many an oat (Note: A reference to the expression "sow one's wild oats". The phrase dates to the 1560s, and during the 16th and 17th century dissolute or wild young men were called 'wild oats'.)
With Kitty and Judy and Mary.
My parents rebuked me for being such a rake
And for spending my time in such frolicsome ways.
I ne'er could forget the good nature of Jane,
Agus fágaimíd siúd mar atá sé. (Note: Translates roughly to English as "And that's enough said about that" or "And we'll leave it at that.")

My parents had reared me to shake and to mow,
To plow and to harrow, to reap and to sow.
My heart being too airy to drop it too low,
I set out on the high speculation.
On paper and parchment they thought me to write,
And in Euclid and grammar they opened my eyes.
And in multiplication, in truth I was bright,
Agus fágaimíd siúd mar atá sé.

If you chance for to go to the town of Rathkeale,
The girls all around me do flock on the square.
Now some offer me porter and others sweet cake,
And they treat me unknownst to their parents.
There's one from Askeaton and one from The Pike, (Note: A region in County Tipperary southeast of Ballingarry, and southwest of Knockshigowna.)
And another from Ardagh my heart has beguiled.
Though being from the mountains, her stockings are white
And I'd love to be tightening her garters.

Now to quarrel for riches, I ne'er was inclined;
For the greatest of misers, they must leave all behind.
But I'll purchase a cow that'll never run dry
And I'll milk her by twisting her horn.
John Damer of Shronell had plenty of gold
And Lord Devonshire's treasures are twenty times more.
But sure they're laid on their backs amidst nettles and stones,
Agus fágaimíd siúd mar atá sé.

The old cow could be milked without clover or grass;
She'd be pampered on barley, sweet corn, and the hops.
She'd be warm, she'd be stout, she'd be free in the paps,
And she'd milk without spancel (Note: A "spancel". is a rope for fettering a cow's hind legs while she is milked.) or halter.
And the man that would drink it, he'd cock his caubeen,
And if anyone laughs we'll have wigs on the green.
And the feeble old hag, she'd get supple and free,
Agus fágaimíd siúd mar atá sé.

If I chance for to go to the market of Croom,
With a cock in my hat and my pipes in full tune,
I am welcome at once and brought up to a room,
Where Bacchus is sporting with Venus.
There's Peggy and Jane from the town of Bruree,
And Biddy from Bruff and we all on the spraoi, (Note: Pronounced (and translates to English) as "spree".)
Such a combing of locks as there was about me,
Agus fágaimíd siúd mar atá sé.

Now there's some say I'm foolish, there's some say I'm wise,
Though being fond of the women I think is no crime.
Sure the son of King David, he had ten thousand wives,
And his wisdom was highly regarded.
I'll till a good garden and work at my ease,
And each woman and child could partake of the same.
If there'd be war in the cabin, themselves they could blame,
Agus fágaimíd siúd mar atá sé.

But now for the future I think I'll get wise
And I'll marry all those women who acted so kind.
Aye, I'd marry them all on the morrow by and by,
If the clergy'd agree to the bargain.
And then when I'd be old and my soul be at rest,
All those children and wives they could keen at my wake.
Aye, they'd all gather round and they'd offer up prayers
To the Lord for the soul of their father.

== Notable recordings ==
- The Wolfe Tones on their 1965 debut album The Foggy Dew
- The Dubliners on their 1967 album A Drop of the Hard Stuff (sung a capella by Ciaran Bourke)
- The Clancy Brothers on their 1970 album Welcome to Our House
- Paddy Reilly on his 1972 album At Home
- Christy Moore on his 1976 self titled album
- The Pogues on their 1990 EP Yeah Yeah Yeah Yeah Yeah and reissue of their 1989 album Peace and Love
- Ronnie Drew on his 1999 album The Humour Is on Me Now
- The Irish Rovers on their 2002 album Another Round (as "The Rake")
- The Mary Wallopers song The Night the Gards Raided Oweny’s is to the tune of Limerick Rake
