= Peter Gaussen =

Governor of the Bank of England (1723–1788)

- Born: 1723
- Died: 1788 (aged 64–65)
- Occupation: Governor

Peter Gaussen (1723–1788) was Governor of the Bank of England from 1777 to 1779.

He was born Jean-Pierre Gaussen in Geneva, the son of Paul Gaussen, a French Huguenot, and moved to London in 1739.

He was Deputy Governor of the Bank of England from 1776 to 1777. He replaced Samuel Beachcroft as governor in 1777 (in doing so he became the first foreign-born governor of the Bank of England) and was succeeded in turn by Daniel Booth in 1779. Gaussen's tenure as Governor occurred during the Bengal bubble crash (1769–1784).

On 16 February 1755 he had married his second cousin Anna Bosanquet, the daughter of Samuel Bosanquet. Their first son, also Peter, was born on 19 January 1756, their daughter Jane on 24 February 1757, and their son Samuel Robert on 27 February 1759. The eldest son, Peter, was buried in the North choir of St Helen's Church, Bishopsgate on 3 November 1781. Peter himself died on 20 November 1788 and was buried in the chancel of the same church on 28 November. A funerary monument depicts a woman, probably Charity, holding a medallion portrait of Peter Gaussen, and with three children below.

Their third-born son, Samuel Robert Gaussen (1759–1812) was MP for Warwick (1796–1802) and a collector of the works of prominent landscape painter Paul Sandby. Peter bought Brookmans Manor in Hertfordshire as a gift for Samuel in 1786.

== See also ==
- Chief Cashier of the Bank of England
