= Came House =

Grade I listed building in Dorset, England

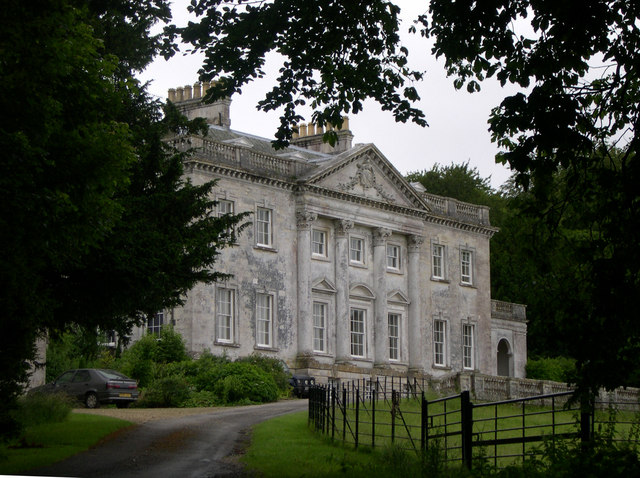

- Location within Dorset

General information
- Status: Grade I listed
- Location: Winterborne Came, Dorset grid reference SY 705 882, Winterborne Came, Dorchester, Dorset DT2 8NU, United Kingdom
- Coordinates: 50.6931°N 2.4194°W
- Completed: 1754

Website
- www.camehouse.co.uk

Came House is a privately owned country house next to the village of Winterborne Came, in Dorset, England. Built in the mid-18th century, it is a Grade I listed building.

== Description ==
=== History ===
The house was built for John Damer by Francis Cartwright of Blandford in 1754; after Cartwright's death in 1758, the interior was completed by Vile and Cobb, cabinet makers of London, in 1762. There is a kitchen wing on the east, connected to the house by a passageway.

In the mid-19th century an entrance with a porch, vestibule and cloakrooms, and a cast-iron domed conservatory, were added on the west side of the house. The conservatory is attributed to the architect Charles Fowler. A library was also established at that time and other minor changes were made. There have otherwise been few alterations.

=== Present day ===
As of 2021, the house is a venue for weddings and parties.
