= 3rd Royal Lancashire Militia (The Duke of Lancaster's Own) =

Auxiliary unit of the British Army

3rd Royal Lancashire Militia (The Duke of Lancaster's Own) 3rd & 4th Bns Loyal North Lancashire Regiment
- Active: 2 March 1797–April 1953
- Country: United Kingdom
- Branch: Militia/Special Reserve
- Role: Infantry
- Size: 1-2 Battalions
- Garrison/HQ: Fulwood Barracks, Preston, Lancashire
- Engagements: Second Boer War

Commanders
- Notable commanders: Sir Henry Hoghton, 7th Baronet; Wilson Gale-Braddyll; John Wilson-Patten, 1st Baron Winmarleigh; Sir Vivian Henderson

The 3rd Royal Lancashire Militia (The Duke of Lancaster's Own) was an auxiliary (Note: It is incorrect to describe the British Militia as 'irregular': throughout their history they were equipped and trained exactly like the line regiments of the regular army, and once embodied in time of war they were fulltime professional soldiers for the duration of their enlistment.) regiment raised in the county of Lancashire in North West England during the French Revolutionary War. It later became part of the Loyal North Lancashire Regiment. Although primarily intended for home defence, its battalions served in Ireland, Gibraltar and Malta and saw active service during the Second Boer War. After conversion to the Special Reserve (SR) under the Haldane Reforms it supplied reinforcements to the fighting battalions during World War I. After a shadowy postwar existence the unit was finally disbanded in 1953.

== Background ==
The universal obligation to military service in the Shire levy was long established in England and its legal basis was updated by two Acts of 1557 (4 & 5 Ph. & M.), which placed selected men, the 'Trained Bands', under the command of Lords Lieutenant appointed by the monarch. This is seen as the starting date for the organised county militia in England. It was an important element in the country's defence at the time of the Spanish Armada in the 1580s, and control of the militia was one of the areas of dispute between King Charles I and Parliament that led to the English Civil War. The English Militia was re-established under local control in 1662 after the Restoration of the monarchy, and the Lancashire Militia fought in King William III's campaign in Ireland in 1690–91, and against the Jacobite Risings in 1715 and 1745. However, between periods of national emergency the militia was regularly allowed to decline.

Under threat of French invasion during the Seven Years' War a series of Militia Acts from 1757 reorganised the county militia regiments, the men being conscripted by means of parish ballots (paid substitutes were permitted) to serve for three years. In 1760 Lancashire's quota was set at 800 men in one regiment, which received the title Royal Lancashire Militia in 1761. These reformed regiments were 'embodied' for permanent service in home defence until the end of the Seven Years' War and again during the War of American Independence. In peacetime they assembled for 28 days' annual training. The militia were re-embodied shortly before Revolutionary France declared war on Britain on 1 February 1793.

== 3rd Royal Lancashire Militia ==
=== French Revolutionary War ===
Lancashire's militia quota set in 1760 was small in proportion to its population, which soared during the Industrial Revolution. By 1796 it represented only one man in every 43 of those eligible. But in that year an additional ballot was carried out to raise men for the 'Supplementary Militia' to reinforce the standing militia regiments and to form additional temporary regiments. Lancashire's quota was increased to five regiments, and recruitment became difficult. Nevertheless, the 2nd Royal Lancashire Supplementary Militia was raised on 2 March 1797 at Preston under the command of Sir Henry Hoghton, 7th Baronet (Member of parliament (MP) for Preston) as Colonel of the Regiment. (Note: Hoghton was commissioned as a Brevet Colonel in the army on 2 October 1797, backdated to 2 March.) It was formally embodied for service on 25 February 1798, and was placed on a permanent footing as the 3rd Royal Lancashire Militia (3rd RLM) in 1800. The Peace of Amiens was signed on 27 March 1802, and the regiment was disembodied on 24 April, apart from the small permanent staff. The supplementary militia was abolished in 1799, the remaining balloted men in Lancashire being distributed to the 1st, 2nd and 3rd RLM to fill vacancies

=== Napoleonic Wars ===
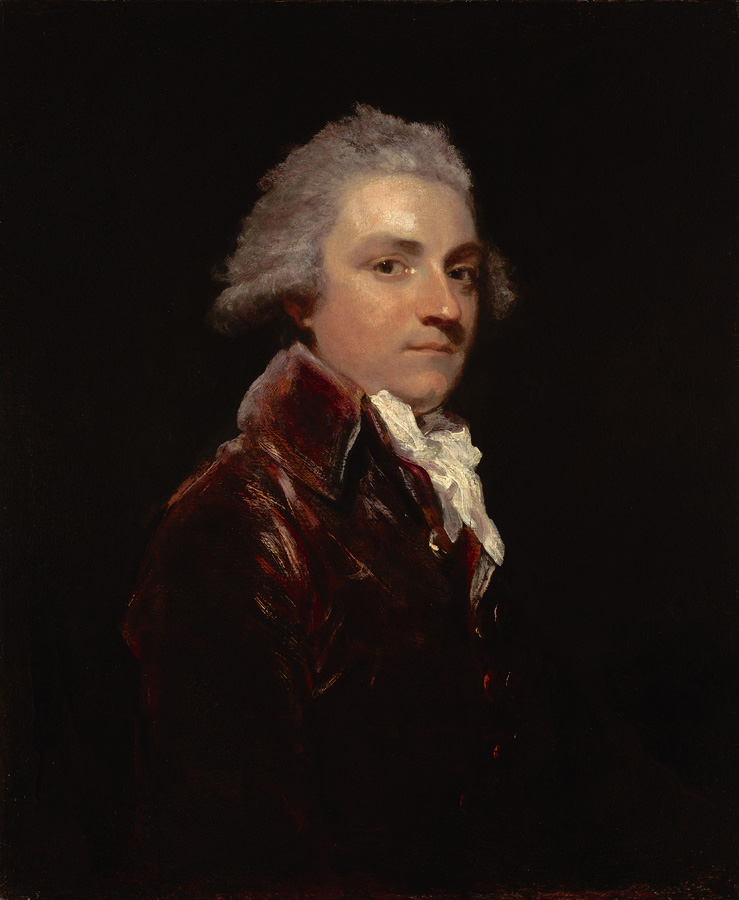
Wilson Gale-Braddyll by Sir Joshua Reynolds.

The Peace of Amiens was short-lived, and the militia was called out again: the 3rd Royal Lancashire Militia being embodied on 4 April 1803 under the command of Col Wilson Gale-Braddyll of Conishead Priory. The regiment was stationed at Landguard Fort on the Suffolk coast for part of 1803. From about 1804 the regiment's 10 companies included a rifle company.

In July 1805 the regiment moved to Lympstone Camp, where it joined Lt-Gen Charles Lennox's militia brigade for the summer while Napoleon's 'Army of England' massed at Boulogne and threatened invasion. On 1 September the regiment was 957 strong under the command of Lt-Col John Sedgwick. On 15 September the brigade marched to Hemerdon, arriving on 20 September. This camp was broken up on 22 December and the regiments dispersed.

During the French Wars the militia were employed anywhere in the country for coast defence, manning garrisons, guarding prisoners of war, and for internal security, while the Regular Army regarded them as a source of trained men if they could be persuaded to transfer. The 3rd RLM was successively stationed at Exeter, Bristol, Gosport, Alton, Chichester and Dover. The regiment was granted the subtitle The Prince Regent's Own in 1813 (Col Gale-Braddyll was an associate of the Prince Regent).

The 3rd RLM volunteered for service in Ireland in 1813. Although most of the militia was disembodied after the Treaty of Fontainebleau in April 1814, the 3rd RLM was still in Ireland when Napoleon escaped from Elba and returned to power in France in 1815. The three regiments of Lancashire Militia, which happened to be stationed together at Dublin, were allowed to recruit back to full strength by ballot and 'by beat of drum'. They also provided drafts of around 1000 volunteers to the regular regiments being sent to Belgium. There is a story that many of the Guardsmen at the Battle of Waterloo were still wearing their Militia uniforms. The militia continued to do duty after the Battle of Waterloo while much of the Regular Army was with the Army of Occupation, and the 3rd RLM did not return from Ireland to be disembodied until January 1816.

=== Long peace ===
The Militia Act 1817 (57 Geo. 3. c. 57) allowed the annual training of the Militia to be dispensed with. So although officers continued to be commissioned into the regiment (Note: In 1825 for instance, Thomas Bold Hoghton and Thomas Henry Hesketh were commissioned as majors and Peter Hesketh as a captain.) and the ballot was regularly held, the selected men were rarely mustered for drill. The ballot was suspended by the Militia Act 1829, and the permanent staffs of sergeants and drummers (who were occasionally used to maintain public order) were progressively reduced.

The 3rd RLM's rifle company was disbanded in 1829. In 1831 King William IV bestowed on the three Lancashire Militia Regiments the additional title The Duke of Lancaster's Own. (Note: The monarch (of either sex) also being Duke of Lancaster.) (replacing the title 'Prince Regent's Own' carried by the 3rd RLM). No further militia training took place for the next 21 years, although officers continued to be appointed to fill vacancies (the local politician John Wilson-Patten (later Lord Winmarleigh) was appointed colonel in 1842).

== 1852 reforms ==
The Militia of the United Kingdom was revived by the Militia Act 1852, enacted during a period of international tension. As before, units were raised and administered on a county basis, and filled by voluntary enlistment (although conscription by means of the militia ballot might be used if the counties failed to meet their quotas). Training was for 56 days on enlistment, then for 21–28 days per year, during which the men received full army pay. Under the Act, militia units could be embodied by Royal Proclamation for full-time service in three circumstances:

1. 'Whenever a state of war exists between Her Majesty and any foreign power'.
2. 'In all cases of invasion or upon imminent danger thereof'.
3. 'In all cases of rebellion or insurrection'.

With the threat of war against Russia, the three Lancashire regiments were ordered to recruit up to their full establishment of 1200 men, and two additional militia infantry regiments (the 4th and 5th) and an artillery unit were formed in Lancashire. Once the Crimean War had broken out the 6th and 7th Lancashire Militia were formed and the 2nd RLM also raised a 2nd Battalion at this time. The different regiments were each allocated a recruiting area with the 3rd RLM, based at Preston, also recruiting from Blackburn, Garstang, Leyland and Rochdale.

=== Crimea and after ===
War having broken out with Russia in 1854 and an expeditionary force sent to the Crimea, the militia were called out for home defence and service in overseas garrisons. The 3rd RLM was embodied in April 1855 and volunteered for overseas service. It sailed from Liverpool to Gibraltar where it carried out garrison duty for a year, commanded in person by its colonel, John Wilson-Patten, MP, despite his political duties. It returned to the UK to be disembodied in July 1856. The regiment was awarded the Battle honour Mediterranean for this service. Although a number of militia regiments were embodied to relieve regular units sent to fight in the Indian Mutiny, the 3rd RLM was not among them.

In 1867 the Militia Reserve was created, consisting of present and former militiamen who undertook to serve overseas in case of war.

== Cardwell reforms ==
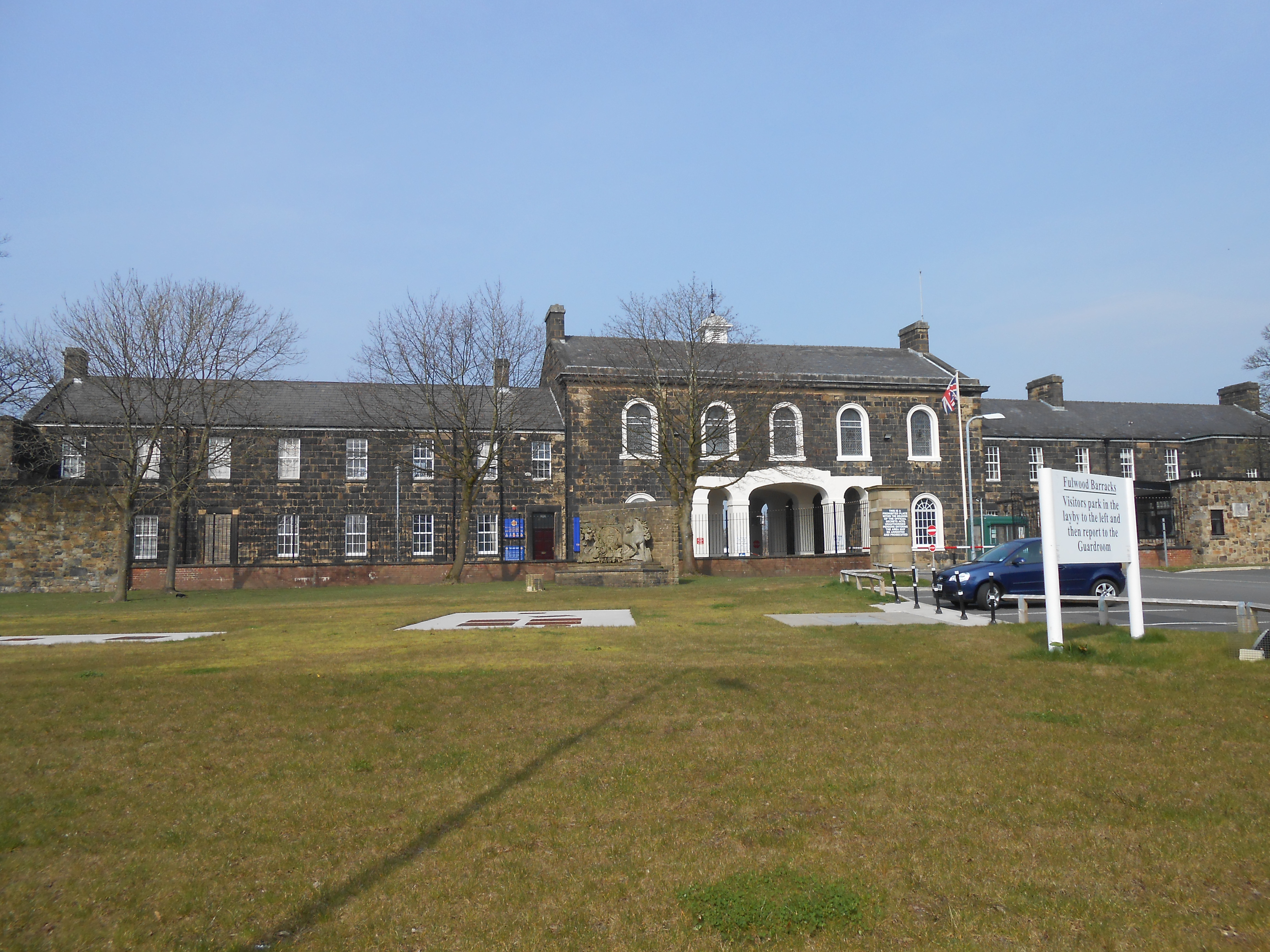
Fulwood Barracks

Under the 'Localisation of the Forces' scheme introduced by the Cardwell Reforms of 1872, Militia regiments were brigaded with regular and Volunteer battalions in a regimental district sharing a permanent depot at a suitable county town. Seven double-battalion or pairs of single-battalion regular regiments were assigned to Lancashire, and each was linked with one of the county's militia regiments. The militia now came under the War Office rather than their county lords lieutenant, and officers' commissions were signed by the Queen.

The 3rd RLM was linked with the 47th (Lancashire) and 81st (Loyal Lincoln Volunteers) Regiments of Foot in Sub-District No 12 (Lancashire), with the depot established at Fulwood Barracks in Preston. It was intended for the 3rd RLM to raise its own 2nd Battalion. Although often referred to as brigades, the regimental districts were purely administrative organisations, but in a continuation of the Cardwell Reforms a mobilisation scheme began to appear in the Army List from December 1875. This assigned regular and militia units to places in an order of battle of corps, divisions and brigades for the 'Active Army', even though these formations were entirely theoretical, with no staff or services assigned. The 1st, 2nd and 3rd Royal Lancashire Militia formed 1st Brigade of 3rd Division, VI Corps; the brigade would have mustered at Manchester in time of war.

== 3rd and 4th Battalions, Loyal North Lancashire Regiment ==
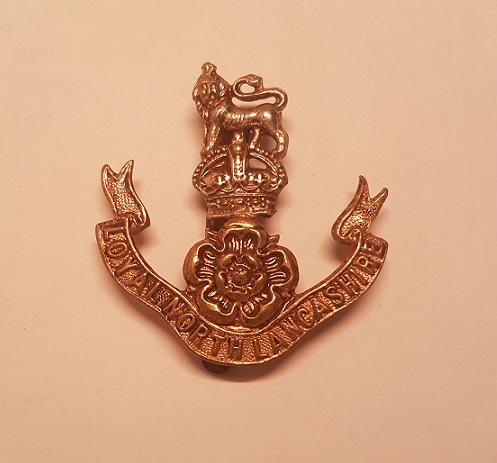
The Loyals' cap badge

The Childers Reforms completed the process by incorporating the militia battalions into the expanded county regiments. On 1 July 1881 the 47th and 81st Foot became the 1st and 2nd Battalions of the Loyal North Lancashire Regiment with the 3rd Royal Lancashire Militia (The Duke of Lancaster's Own) as its 3rd Battalion. The 2nd Bn of the 3rd RLM, which had finally been formed during 1879, became the 4th Bn Loyals; however, it was amalgamated back into the 3rd Bn in 1896. Militia battalions now had a large cadre of permanent staff (about 30). Around a third of the recruits and many young officers went on to join the Regular Army.

=== Second Boer War ===
After the disasters of Black Week at the start of the Second Boer War in December 1899, most of the regular army was sent to South Africa, followed by many militia reservists as reinforcements. Militia units were embodied to replace them for home defence and a number volunteered for active service or to garrison overseas stations.

The 3rd Bn Loyals was among the first militia units to be embodied, on 13 December 1899, and went to Kent for pre-deployment training at Shorncliffe and Lydd. It then embarked on 12 January 1900 and sailed to Malta to relieve a regular army battalion in the garrison there. A year later the manpower needs of the guerrilla war in South Africa led to the battalion re-embarking from Malta on 2 March 1901. It arrived in South Africa on 30 March with a strength of 24 officers and 805 other ranks (ORs) under the command of Lieutenant-Colonel James Pedder, and was employed on the lines of communication from Port Elizabeth to Aliwal North. Lieutenant Mackie of the battalion distinguished himself by his handling of a party of Mounted infantry against a superior number of Boers and in endeavouring to bring in a wounded man; he was rewarded with a regular commission. The battalion embarked for home on 13 February 1902 and was disembodied on 15 March.

While serving in South Africa the battalion lost three ORs killed or died of disease. It was awarded the Battle Honours Mediterranean 1900–01 and South Africa 1901–02 and the officers and men received the Queen's South Africa Medal with clasps '1901' and '1902'.

== Special Reserve ==
After the Boer War, the future of the Militia was called into question. There were moves to reform the Auxiliary Forces (Militia, Yeomanry and Volunteers) to take their place in the six army corps proposed by St John Brodrick as Secretary of State for War. However, little of Brodrick's scheme was carried out.

Under the sweeping Haldane Reforms of 1908, the Militia was replaced by the Special Reserve, a semi-professional force similar to the previous Militia Reserve, whose role was to provide reinforcement drafts for regular units serving overseas in wartime. The battalion became the 3rd (Reserve) Battalion, Loyal North Lancashire Regiment, on 27 July 1908.

== World War I ==
=== 3rd (Reserve) Battalion ===
The Special Reserve was embodied on the outbreak of World War I on 4 August 1914 and on 9 August the battalion proceeded under the command of Lt-Col Thomas Cowper-Essex (commanding officer since 1906) to its war station at Felixstowe in the Harwich Garrison. Here it remained for the whole war, carrying out the dual tasks of garrison duties and preparing reinforcement drafts of regular reservists, special reservists, recruits and returning wounded for the regular battalions serving overseas. The 1st Bn served on the Western Front for the whole war; the 2nd Bn was in India on the outbreak of war and landed in East Africa, later transferring to Egypt and finally to the Western Front. The 3rd Bn also formed the 11th (Reserve) Battalion of the Loyals at Felixstowe in October 1914 for Kitchener's Army units. After the war the 3rd Bn was disembodied on 2 August 1919.

=== 11th (Reserve) Battalion ===
After Lord Kitchener issued his call for volunteers in August 1914, the battalions of the 1st, 2nd and 3rd New Armies ('K1', 'K2' and 'K3' of 'Kitchener's Army') were quickly formed at the regimental depots. The SR battalions also swelled with new recruits and were soon well above their establishment strength. On 8 October 1914 each SR battalion was ordered to use the surplus to form a service battalion of the 4th New Army ('K4'). Accordingly, the 3rd (Reserve) Bn formed the 11th (Service) Bn at Felixstowe in October. The other battalions of the Special Reserve Bde in the Harwich Garrison carried out a similar process, and the K4 battalions of the Norfolk Regiment, Suffolk Regiment, Bedfordshire Regiment and Essex Regiment constituted 94th Brigade in 31st Division. 11th Loyals then replaced the Essex battalion in 94th Bde on 28 November. In early 1915 an outbreak of Cerebrospinal meningitis in 94th Bde at Felixstowe caused the battalions to be scattered, the 11th Loyals going to Chichester in Sussex in March. On 10 April 1915 the War Office decided to convert the K4 battalions into 2nd Reserve units, providing drafts for the K1–K3 battalions in the same way that the SR was doing for the Regular battalions. The battalion of the Loyals became 11th (Reserve) Battalion, and 94th Bde became 6th Reserve Brigade, which re-assembled in Essex in May 1915, with the Loyals stationed at Billericay. In September 1915 the battalion transferred to 4th Reserve Brigade at Seaford in Sussex. On 1 September 1916 the 2nd Reserve battalions were transferred to the Training Reserve (TR) and the battalion became 17th Training Reserve Bn. The training staff retained their Loyals badges. The battelion was redesignated 284th (Infantry) Bn, TR on 1 September 1917 and on 17 September it joined 202nd Bde in 67th Division at Canterbury in Kent. On 27 October the battalion transferred to the King's Royal Rifle Corps (KRRC) as 51st (Graduated) Bn. In January 1918 the battalion was at Margate in Kent, but during the winter the division moved to Essex and 51st (G) Bn went to Colchester, where it remained or the rest of the war. After the war ended it was converted to a service battalion of the KRRC at Colchester on 8 February 1919 and sent to join the British Army of the Rhine. There it was absorbed into 13th (Service) Bn, KRRC, on 4 April 1919.

=== Postwar ===
The SR resumed its old title of Militia in 1921 and then became the Supplementary Reserve in 1924, but almost all militia battalions remained in abeyance after World War I. By 1939 the only officer in the Army List for 3rd Bn was Lt-Col Sir Vivian Henderson, commanding officer since 1921. (Note: However, the Loyal Regiment (North Lancashire) did have a number of Supplementary Reserve officers Category B attached to it.) The militia were not activated during World War II and were all formally disbanded in April 1953.

== Commanders ==
=== Commanding Officers ===
The following served as Colonel or (after 1852) Lieutenant-Colonel Commandant of the regiment (incomplete list):

- Sir Henry Hoghton, 7th Baronet, commissioned as colonel 2 March 1797, until 1803
- Col Wilson Gale-Braddyll, promoted 1803
- Col Sir Thomas Dalrymple Hesketh, 3rd Baronet of Rufford, formerly Lt-Col Commandant of the Leyland and Ormskirk Local Militia 1808–16, died 27 July 1842
- Col John Wilson-Patten (later Lord Winmarleigh), appointed 15 November 1842
- Lt-Col Thomas Crosse, appointed (1st Bn) 1 August 1874
- Lt-Col Frederick Silvester, appointed (2nd Bn) 20 September 1879
- Lt-Col Leith Bonhôte, appointed 29 September 1897
- Lt-Col James Pedder, promoted 3 July 1901
- Lt-Col Thomas Cowper-Essex, promoted 15 September 1906, and continued with the SR battalion 26 July 1908
- Lt-Col Sir Vivian Henderson, MC, appointed 15 October 1921

=== Honorary Colonels ===
The following served as Honorary Colonel of the regiment:

- Col Lord Winmarleigh, appointed 27 February 1872
- Field Marshal Frederick, Earl Roberts, appointed 1 January 1898, continued with the SR battalion 26 July 1908
- Col Thomas Cowper-Essex, appointed 22 March 1916

=== Other personalities ===
- Frank Percy Crozier, former lieutenant in the Manchester Regiment, was commissioned as a captain in the 3rd Bn Loyals on 17 June 1908, but was forced to resign the following year over dishonoured cheques. He was later a mercenary officer in the illegal Ulster Volunteers, achieved the rank of Brigadier-General during World War I, and was author of A Brass Hat in No Man's Land and other works.

== Heritage and ceremonial ==
=== Uniforms and insignia ===
The uniform of the Royal Lancashire Militia was red with the blue facings appropriate to 'Royal' regiments. By 1803 the lace button loops were arranged in threes (denoting the 3rd Regiment, as in the Brigade of Guards). By Royal warrant in 1805 militia colonels were reminded that their grenadier company was to wear the Bearskin cap (despite the cost). The rifle company of the 3rd RLM was dressed in the style of the 95th Rifles.

Around 1810 the regimental buttons bore the number '3' over the letters 'RL' within a crowned star, after 1810 the centre of the eight-rayed star had a circle inscribed '3 ROYAL + LANCASHIRE' enclosing a Lancashire rose, with a coronet above. The officers' oval pouchbelt plate had a similar design without the star, the circle being a garter inscribed 'THIRD ROYAL LANCASHIRE'. After 1813 the lettering on the buttons changed to 'PRINCE REGENT'S OWN' and the coronet reverted to a crown.

In 1803 the colonels of the three Lancashire Militia regiments were granted royal permission to use the Red Rose of Lancaster as the badge on their blue Regimental colours. Another source suggests that the badges and buttons (date unspecified) had the red rose within a palm wreath. The officers' waistbelt plate of 1855–81 was of the universal pattern with the Royal cypher ('VR') and crown within a circle inscribed with the title.

When the 3rd RLM joined the Loyals in 1881, it adopted that regiment's white facings and insignia.

=== Precedence ===
In the early days militia regiments serving together drew lots for their relative precedence. From 1778 the counties were given an order of precedence determined by ballot each year, but the militia order of precedence balloted for in 1793 (when Lancashire was 37th) remained in force throughout the French Revolutionary War: this covered all the regiments formed in the county. Another ballot for precedence took place at the start of the Napoleonic War: Lancashire was 52nd. This list continued until 1833. In that year the King drew the lots for individual regiments and the resulting list remained in force with minor amendments until the end of the militia; the 3rd RLM was 125th. Formally, the regiment became the 125th, or 3rd Royal Lancashire Militia (The Duke of Lancaster's Own), but like most regiments it seems to have paid little attention to the additional number.

=== Memorial ===
There is a memorial tablet in St Peter and St Paul's Church in Felixstowe to the men of 3rd Bn Loyals who died during World War I. It explains that the battalion was stationed in Old Felixstowe as part of the Harwich garrison and regularly sent drafts to both regular battalions and other battalions of the regiment serving overseas.

== See also ==
- Militia (English)
- Militia (Great Britain)
- Militia (United Kingdom)
- Special Reserve
- Lancashire Militia
- Loyal North Lancashire Regiment

== External sources ==
- History of Parliament Online
- Imperial War Museum, War Memorials Register
- Duke of Lancaster's Regiment, Lancashire Infantry Museum
- Lancashire Record Office, Handlist 72
- Richard A. Warren, This Re-illuminated School of Mars: Auxiliary forces and other aspects of Albion under Arms in the Great War against France
- Museum of the Manchester Regiment
- Land Forces of Britain, the Empire and Commonwealth – Regiments.org (archive site)
