= Daniel Booth =

Governor of the Bank of England (died 1788)

- Died: 7 June 1788
- Occupation: Governor of the Bank of England from 1779 to 1781

Daniel Booth (died 7 June 1788) was Governor of the Bank of England from 1779 to 1781. He had been Deputy Governor from 1777 to 1779. He replaced Peter Gaussen as Governor and was succeeded by William Ewer. Booth's tenure as Governor occurred during the Bengal bubble crash (1769–1784).

== Life ==
He was the son of Daniel Booth, factor to the Canterbury weavers. He became a Bank of England director in 1761. His residence was Hutton Hall in Essex.

Booth had three daughters, of whom the eldest married Sir Henry Hoghton, 6th Baronet, as his second wife.

== See also ==
- Chief Cashier of the Bank of England
