= Charles Ewer =

Member of the Parliament of Great Britain for Shaftesbury
- In office 1741 – 20 June 1742
- Succeeded by: George Pitt, 1st Baron Rivers

Personal details
- Died: 20 June 1742
- Relations: Anthony Ashley Cooper (nephew); Thomas Ewer (nephew); William Ewer (nephew)

Charles Ewer (died 20 June 1742) was an English politician who served as a Member of Parliament (MP) for Shaftesbury.

== Biography ==
Ewer, a London grocer, came from a Hertfordshire family who settled at Watford since the time of Henry VIII. In March 1741 he was chosen to represent the Broad St. ward on the Court of Aldermen, standing as a radical and anti-Walpole candidate. He was returned to Parliament for Shaftesbury on the interest of his nephew, Anthony Ashley Cooper, 4th Earl of Shaftesbury.

== See also ==
- List of MPs elected in the 1741 British general election
