= Lancashire Militia =

Auxiliary military force in Lancashire, England

The Lancashire Militia was an auxiliary (Note: It is incorrect to describe the British Militia as 'irregular': throughout their history they were equipped and trained exactly like the line regiments of the regular army, and once embodied in time of war they were fulltime professional soldiers for the duration of their enlistment.) military force in Lancashire in North West England. From their formal organisation as Trained Bands in 1558 and their service in the Williamite War in Ireland and against the Jacobite Risings, the Militia regiments of Lancashire served during times of international tension and all of Britain's major wars. They provided internal security and home defence but sometimes operated further afield, including Ireland and the Mediterranean, relieving regular troops from routine garrison duties, and acting as a source of trained officers and men for the Regular Army. All the infantry battalions went on active service during the Second Boer War and all served as Special Reserve training units in World War I, with one battalion seeing considerable action on the Western Front. After 1921 the militia had only a shadowy existence until its final abolition in 1953.

== Early history ==
The English militia was descended from the Anglo-Saxon Fyrd, the military force raised from the freemen of the shires under command of their Sheriff. It continued under the Norman kings, notably at the Battle of the Standard (1138). The force was reorganised under the Assizes of Arms of 1181 and 1252, and again by King Edward I's Statute of Winchester of 1285.

Under this statute 'Commissioners of Array' would levy the required number of men from each shire. The usual shire contingent was 1000 infantry commanded by a millenar, divided into companies of 100 commanded by centenars or constables, and subdivided into platoons of 20 led by vintenars. Edward I regularly summoned the men of the County palatine of Lancaster (Lancashire) to fight in his Welsh Wars and to the army that won the Battle of Falkirk in Scotland in 1298. (John E. Morris, the historian of Edward's Welsh Wars writing in 1901, likened this process to calling out the Militia Battalion of the Lancashire Fusiliers). A contingent of 2000 men was summoned from Lancashire for the campaign of 1300, and in the event 1000 men in 10 companies, together with 327 men from Blackburnshire, were present at the Siege of Caerlaverock. This procedure was continued for border campaigns under later kings, with the shire levies of Lancashire and other northern counties being called out in 1327 during the campaign that ended in the Battle of Stanhope Park. By now the infantry were mainly equipped with the English longbow. Edward III called out the Lancashire levies in 1332 and again 1333, when they served at the Siege of Berwick and the Battle of Halidon Hill. In 1334 the king ordered 4000 archers to be levied in Lancashire, and almost 1000 (a quarter of them Mounted infantry) served in 1335.

== Lancashire Trained Bands ==
The legal basis of the militia was updated by two acts of 1557 covering musters (4 & 5 Ph. & M. c. 3) and the maintenance of horses and armour (4 & 5 Ph. & M. c. 2). The county militia was now under the Lord Lieutenant, assisted by the Deputy Lieutenants and Justices of the Peace (JPs). The entry into force of these Acts in 1558 is seen as the starting date for the organised county militia in England.

Although the militia obligation was universal, it was clearly impractical to train and equip every able-bodied man, so after 1572 the practice was to select a proportion of men for the Trained Bands, who were mustered for regular training. Lancashire held a two-day 'general muster' at Michaelmas, and two 'special musters' lasting four days for detailed training at Easter and Whitsun. The Lancashire JPs ordered armouries to be set up at Lancaster, Preston, Chorley, Ormskirk, Whalley and Manchester to store the arms and armour for the trained bands. Although the trained bands were exempt from foreign service, they were frequently employed in Ireland. The Armada Crisis in 1588 led to the mobilisation of the trained bands and Lancashire furnished 1170 trained men, with 20 lancers and 50 light horsemen (another return has 64 lancers and 265 light horse).

=== English Civil War ===
With the passing of the threat of invasion, the trained bands declined in the early 17th Century. Later, King Charles I attempted to reform them into a national force or 'Perfect Militia' answering to the king rather than local control. The trained bands including the Lancashire contingent were called out in 1639 and 1640 for the Bishops' Wars, though many of the men who actually went were untrained hired substitutes

Control of the trained bands was one of the major points of dispute between Charles I and Parliament that led to the English Civil War, but with a few exceptions neither side made much use of the trained bands during the war beyond securing the county armouries for their own full-time troops. Lord Wharton had been appointed Lord Lieutenant of Lancashire by Parliament in 1641, and on the outbreak of hostilities in July 1642 he attempted to seize the trained bands' magazine at Manchester, being forestalled by Lord Strange and William Farington (appointed Commissioner of Array by the King), who had already gained control of the magazines at Liverpool and Preston for the Royalists. The resulting skirmish at Manchester on 15 July when Strange and his men were driven out by Wharton's Parliamentarians, was among the first battles of the war.

Once Parliament had established full control in 1648 it passed new Militia Acts that replaced lords lieutenant with county commissioners appointed by Parliament or the Council of State. At the same time the term 'Trained Band' began to disappear in most counties. Under the Commonwealth and Protectorate the militia received pay when called out, and operated alongside the New Model Army to control the country.

== Lancashire Militia ==
After the Restoration of the Monarchy, the English Militia was re-established by the Militia Act 1661 under the control of the king's lords-lieutenant, the men to be selected by ballot. This was popularly seen as the 'Constitutional Force' to counterbalance a 'Standing Army' tainted by association with the New Model Army that had supported Cromwell's military dictatorship.

The Lancashire Militia were called out in 1663 when there were rumours of plots against the new regime, and no sooner had they been sent home in October than they were called out again on receipt of new information. Some counties were slack in training and equipping their men: in 1674 most of the weapons of the Lancashire Militia were found to be defective, and many had to be replaced again in 1689.

=== Nine Years' War ===
Following the Glorious Revolution in which King William III supplanted James II the militia were called out in 1689. The Lord Lieutenant of Lancashire, William Stanley, 9th Earl of Derby, organised three regiments of foot and three Troops of horse. This brigade volunteered for service in William's campaign in Ireland under the command of the Earl of Derby's brother, Lieutenant-Colonel the Hon James Stanley. After training on Fulwood Moor near Preston it sailed with the army from Wallasey in June 1690 and played a full part in the campaign, at the Siege of Carrickfergus, the Battle of the Boyne, and the Siege of Athlone. It returned to England in September 1691 to be disembodied.

=== Jacobite Risings ===
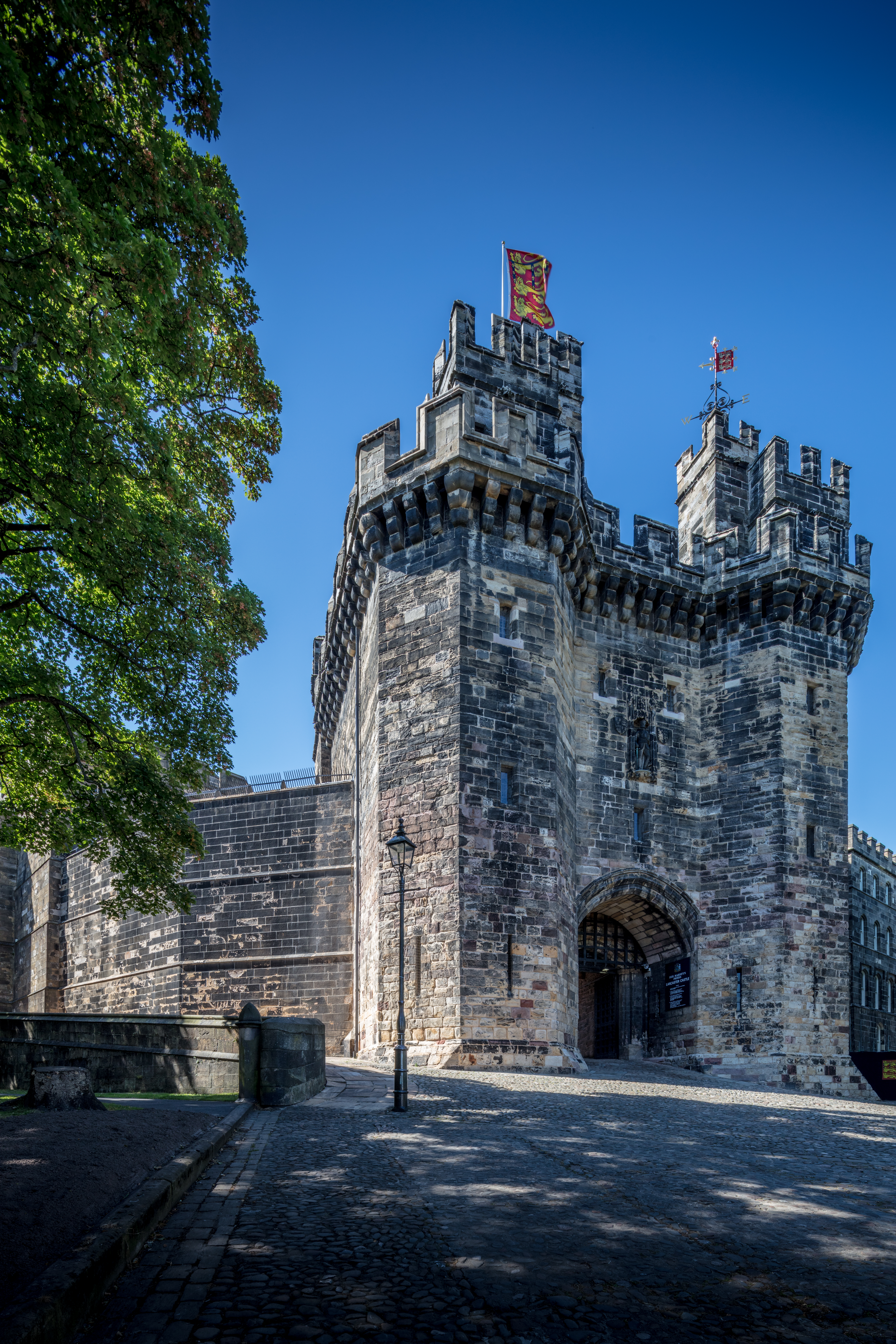
Lancaster Castle today, with the Duchy of Lancaster flag flying.

A regiment of the Lancashire Militia was called out on the outbreak of the Jacobite Rising of 1715, and fought at the Battle of Preston on 12–13 November, where they suffered heavy losses (11 officers and 105 men) attacking the rebel barricades in Church Street. In the Jacobite Rising of 1745, while the Lancashire Militia concentrated to protect Liverpool, the company at Lancaster succeeded in removing the county weapons from the armoury before the rebels arrived. This company then operated alongside a volunteer unit, the 'Liverpool Blues', in harrying the Young Pretender's force as it marched through Lancashire. They destroyed bridges and cutting off stragglers, before joining the regulars in the Clifton Moor Skirmish against the retreating Jacobites.

After it was disembodied in January 1746 the Lancashire Militia was not called out again for training or active service until the Seven Years' War.

== 1757 reforms ==
=== Seven Years' War ===
The 1757 Militia Act re-established the county militia regiments, raised by conscription by means of parish ballots. Lancashire's quota was set at 800 men in one regiment which was embodied for service on 23 December 1760. It received the title Royal Lancashire Militia (RLM) the following year. After serving in home defence for two years the regiment was disembodied in December 1762 once a peace treaty had been agreed. In peacetime, the reformed militia regiments were supposed to be assembled for 28 days' annual training. Part of the RLM held a training camp in 1763, but it was not called out again until 1778.

=== American War of Independence ===
The militia was called out after the outbreak of the War of American Independence when the country was threatened with invasion by the Americans' allies, France and Spain. The Royal Lancashire Militia was embodied in April 1778 and after training was stationed in invasion-threatened Hampshire. It spent the following winter in Liverpool, and then was in garrison on Tyneside for a year in 1779–80. It wintered in Manchester in 1780–81, then spent 1781–82 in Cheshire and 1782–83 along the Cumberland coast. Although Cumberland was remote from a possible French invasion, Whitehaven had been attacked by John Paul Jones in 1778. A peace treaty having been drawn up, the RLM was marched to Manchester for disembodiment in March 1783.

=== French Revolutionary War ===
The militia were re-embodied in January 1793 shortly before Revolutionary France declared war on Britain. During the French Wars the militia were employed anywhere in the country for coast defence, manning garrisons, guarding prisoners of war, and for internal security, while the regulars regarded them as a source of trained men if they could be persuaded to transfer. Their traditional local defence duties were taken over by the part-time Volunteers and mounted Yeomanry.

In February 1793 the RLM was sent into the West Riding of Yorkshire where an outbreak of civil disorder was feared. After it was relieved by regular troops the regiment was moved into the South Yorkshire–North Nottinghamshire area, and then to the East Midlands. In June 1794 the RLM joined the great anti-invasion camp on the South Downs above Brighton. At the end of the year it moved to Kent spending its winter in barracks or billets and its summers in camps on the South Coast. In 1795–96 it became part of a concentration round London to prevent disorder, then in the summer of 1796 the regiment crossed to Warley Camp in Essex. It spent the winter in villages outside London, then went to Plymouth in 1797. In March 1798 legislation was passed (the Militia (No. 4) Act 1798) to allow the militia to volunteer for service in Ireland, where a rebellion had broken out. The 1st Royal Lancashire Militia immediately volunteered, and served there in 1798–99, while the last embers of the rebellion were put down. It returned to Lancashire and was disembodied in November 1799. It was called out again at the end of its 1801 training and stationed at Tynemouth Castle. The Peace of Amiens was signed on 27 March 1802, and on 1 April the regiment was ordered to disembody once more, apart from the small permanent staff.

== Supplementary militia ==
Lancashire's militia quota set in 1760 was small in proportion to its population, which soared during the Industrial Revolution. By 1796 it represented only one man in every 43 of those eligible. But in that year an additional ballot was carried out to raise men for the 'Supplementary Militia' to reinforce the standing militia regiments and to form additional temporary regiments. Lancashire had to find an additional 5160 militiamen in five regiments, the RLM sending a party to Lancaster to begin training them. Although recruitment of such large numbers became difficult, the 1st Royal Lancashire Supplementary Militia was raised on 1 March 1797. It was placed on a permanent footing on 17 August 1798 as the 2nd Royal Lancashire Militia (2nd RLM) after which the 'Old County Regiment' became the 1st Royal Lancashire Militia (1st RLM). (Note: The abbreviation '1st RLM' was used in official correspondence as early as 1799.)

The 2nd Royal Lancashire Supplementary Militia was also raised in 1797 at Preston, becoming the 3rd Royal Lancashire Militia in 1800. The 3rd, 4th and 5th Supplementary Regiments were formed but only had a brief existence. An attempt to turn the 4th Supplementary Regiment into the 5th RLM was abandoned when the men refused to serve in Ireland. The 5th Supplementary Regiment fell into disorder when it was stripped for volunteers by the regulars. The 2nd and 3rd RLM were embodied from March 1798 to April 1802. The supplementary militia was abolished in 1799, the remaining balloted men in Lancashire being distributed to the 1st, 2nd and 3rd RLM to fill vacancies

=== Napoleonic Wars ===
The Peace of Amiens was short-lived, and the militia was called out again in March and April 1803. Once again, the regiments moved around the country, sometimes in garrisons, at other times in anti-invasion camps or guarding Prisoner-of-war camps. In the summer of 1805 the 1st RLM was on duty at Weymouth, Dorset, while the royal family was in residence. In 1811 the 1st RLM was diverted to the Nottingham area to guard against the Luddite disturbances. The 3rd RLM was granted the subtitle Prince Regent's Own in 1813.

Over the same period the 2nd RLM had been successively stationed at Chelmsford, Sunderland, Liverpool, Hull and Tiverton, Devon, the 3rd RLM at Exeter, Bristol, Gosport, Alton, Chichester and Dover.

== Local militia ==
Although the volunteer corps had been reformed after the resumption of the war, their quality varied widely and their numbers steadily declined. One of the chief reasons to join was to avoid the militia ballot. They were supplemented from 1808 by the Local Militia, which were part-time and only to be used within their own districts. If their ranks could not be filled voluntarily the militia ballot was employed. In Lancashire the local militia regiments were organised by townships or hundreds:

- Amounderness Hundred (Preston)
- Blackburn Hundred Higher Division (Burnley)
- Blackburn Hundred Lower Division
- Bolton
- Leyland and Ormskirk
- Liverpool
- Lonsdale Hundred (Lancaster)
- 1st Manchester
- 1st Middleton (Ashton-under-Lyne)
- 2nd Middleton (became Oldham 1809)
- Newton and Failsworth (Culcheth and Newton)
- Oldham (previously 2nd Middleton)
- Prescot (St Helens)
- Trafford House and Hulme (Salford)
- Warrington (then in Lancashire, now in Cheshire)
- Royal Wigan

The Local Militia were uniformed similarly to their county militia regiments. They were increased in numbers in 1812.

There were questions over the loyalty of Local Militia during the Luddite disturbances – in fact the Lancashire Local Militia proved very reliable (probably because they were better paid and fed than the rioters) and a standing detachment of 350 men drawn from the six regiments was kept embodied from May 1812.

=== Ireland and Waterloo ===
Towards the end of the Napoleonic War the militia had become one of the biggest sources of recruits to the regular army, and whole regiments were encouraged to volunteer for garrison service in Ireland on in Continental Europe. The three Lancashire regiments served in Ireland from 1814. Napoleon had abdicated in April and peace was declared on 30 May, but the regiments had still not been disembodied in February 1815 when he escaped from Elba and the war was resumed. The three regiments of Royal Lancashire Militia, which happened to be stationed together at Dublin, were allowed to recruit back to full strength by ballot and 'by beat of drum'. They also provided drafts of around 1000 volunteers to the regular regiments being sent to Belgium, including the Brigade of Guards. There is a story that many of the guardsmen at the Battle of Waterloo were still wearing their militia uniforms.

Waterloo ended the war, but much of the regular army remained in France as part of the Army of Occupation for several months, and the Lancashire Militia continued their garrison duty at Dublin. They returned to Lancashire to be disembodied between February and April 1816.

=== Long peace ===
Militia training was suspended in most years after Waterloo, but the 1st RLM was called out for its 28 days' training in 1821, 1825 and 1831. Balloting continued, but the permanent staffs of sergeants and drummers (who were occasionally used to maintain public order) were progressively reduced. Just before the 1831 training King William IV bestowed on the three Lancashire Militia Regiments the additional title The Duke of Lancaster's Own. (Note: The monarch (of either sex) also being Duke of Lancaster.) (replacing the title 'Prince Regent's Own' carried by the 3rd RLM). No further militia training took place for the next 21 years. Although officers continued to be appointed to fill vacancies the ballot was suspended by the Militia Act 1829.

== 1852 reforms ==
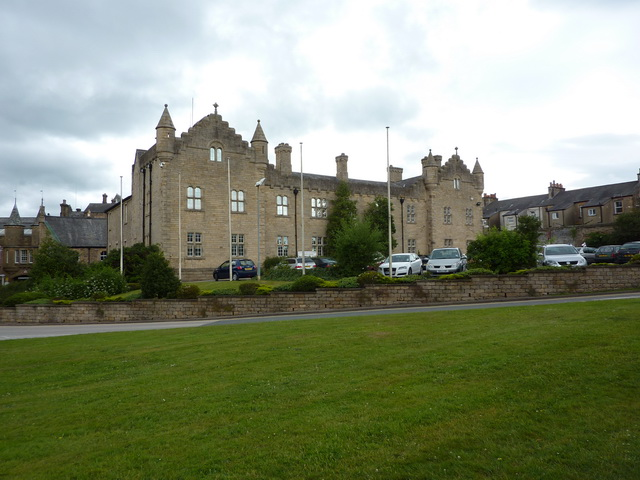
Springfield Barracks, built at Lancaster in 1856 for the 1st Royal Lancashire Militia.

The long-standing militia of the United Kingdom was revived by the Militia Act 1852, enacted during a period of international tension. As before, units were raised and administered on a county basis, and filled by voluntary enlistment (although conscription by means of the militia ballot might be used if the counties failed to meet their quotas). Training was for 56 days on enlistment, then for 21–28 days per year, during which the men received full army pay. Under the Act, militia units could be embodied by Royal Proclamation for full-time service in three circumstances:

1. 'Whenever a state of war exists between Her Majesty and any foreign power'.
2. 'In all cases of invasion or upon imminent danger thereof'.
3. 'In all cases of rebellion or insurrection'.

The 1852 Act introduced Artillery Militia units in addition to the traditional infantry regiments. Their role was to man coastal defences and fortifications, relieving the Royal Artillery (RA) for active service. Lancashire was one of the counties selected to have a corps of militia artillery, and on 10 March 1853 the Lord Lieutenant was requested to raise it from scratch, rather than by conversion of an existing infantry regiment. It came into existence on 13 April 1853 as the Royal Lancashire Militia Artillery (RLMA).

With the threat of war against Russia, the three regiments were ordered to recruit up to their full establishment of 1200 men. Additional infantry militia regiments were also formed in Lancashire at this time: the 4th Duke of Lancaster's Own Light Infantry (soon retitled the 4th Royal Lancashire Militia (The Duke of Lancaster's Own Light Infantry)) raised on 22 March 1853 at Warrington, and the 5th Royal Lancashire Militia raised at Burnley on the same day. The Liverpool-based 2nd RLM raised a 2nd Battalion at Warrington after the 1st Battalion had been embodied for the Crimean War in December 1854. The 2nd RLM was redesignated as a Rifle regiment on 30 January 1855, becoming the 2nd Royal Lancashire Militia (Duke of Lancaster's Own Rifles). These were followed by the 6th Lancashire Militia (Royal from 1860) raised at Ashton-under-Lyne on 8 January 1855 and the 7th Lancashire Militia (Rifles) (Royal from 1864) raised at Bury on 21 February 1855.

Therefore, the Lancashire Militia and its recruiting areas was organised as follows after 1855:

- 1st Royal Lancashire Militia (The Duke of Lancaster's Own) at Lancaster, recruiting from Bolton, Fylde and Manchester – 2nd Battalion raised 1877
- 2nd Royal Lancashire Militia (The Duke of Lancaster's Own Rifles) at Liverpool, recruiting from Kirkdale and Ormskirk – 2nd Battalion at Warrington
- 3rd Royal Lancashire Militia (The Duke of Lancaster's Own) at Preston, recruiting from Blackburn, Garstang, Leyland and Rochdale
- 4th Royal Lancashire Militia (The Duke of Lancaster's Own Light Infantry) at Warrington, recruiting from Liverpool, St Helens and Wigan
- 5th Royal Lancashire Militia at Burnley, recruiting from Accrington, Blackburn, Colne, Middleton, Oldham and Rossendale
- 6th Royal Lancashire Militia at Ashton, recruiting from Manchester – 2nd Battalion raised 1876
- 7th Royal Lancashire Militia (Rifles) at Bury, recruiting from Manchester and Salford
- Royal Lancashire Militia Artillery at Liverpool

=== Crimea and Indian Mutiny ===
War having broken out with Russia in 1854 and an expeditionary force sent to the Crimea, the militia were called out for home defence and service in overseas garrisons:

- 1st RLM: embodied from May 1854 to July 1856; served in the Ionian Islands (then a British protectorate) from March 1855 to May 1856, losing 250 men dead in just two weeks during a cholera outbreak at Zante
- 2nd RLM: embodied from December 1854
- 3rd RLM: embodied and served in Gibraltar from April 1855 to July 1856
- 4th RLM: embodied from December 1854 to June 1856; served in Ireland
- 5th RLM: embodied from March 1854 to January 1855; served in Ireland
- 6th RLM: embodied from May 1855 to 1856
- 7th RLM: the newly raised regiment was not embodied
- RLMA embodied from 25 January 1855 to 30 May 1856

The 1st and 3rd RLM were each awarded the Battle honour Mediterranean for their overseas service.

A number of militia regiments were also embodied to relieve regular troops required for India during the Indian Mutiny. The Lancashire units called out were the 4th RLM, from September 1857 to April 1859, serving at Aldershot and Portsmouth, and the RLMA, embodied from October 1857 to June 1860, which was stationed to man coastal batteries.

The Militia Reserve introduced in 1867 consisted of present and former militiamen who undertook to serve overseas in case of war.

== Cardwell and Childers reforms ==
Under the 'Localisation of the Forces' scheme introduced by the Cardwell Reforms of 1872, Militia regiments were brigaded with regular and Volunteer battalions in a regimental district sharing a permanent depot at a suitable county town. Seven double-battalion or paired single-battalion regular regiments were assigned to Lancashire, and each was linked with one of the militia regiments. The militia now came under the War Office rather than their county lords lieutenant, and officers' commissions were signed by the Queen.

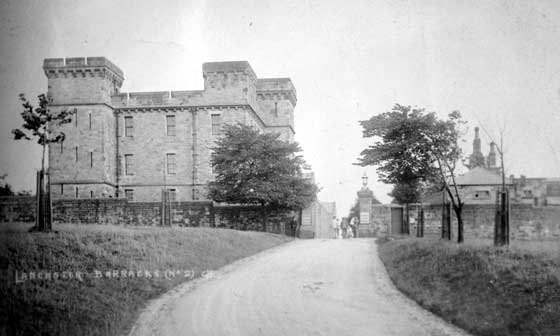
Bowerham Barracks, built at Lancaster between 1876 and 1880 for the depot of the King's Own

Although often referred to as brigades, the regimental districts were purely administrative organisations, but in a continuation of the Cardwell Reforms a mobilisation scheme began to appear in the Army List from December 1875. This assigned regular and militia units to places in an order of battle of corps, divisions and brigades for the 'Active Army', even though these formations were entirely theoretical, with no staff or services assigned:

- 1st, 2nd and 3rd Royal Lancashire Militia formed 1st Brigade of 3rd Division, VI Corps; the brigade would have mustered at Manchester in time of war.
- 4th Royal Lancashire Militia, with two regiments of Cheshire Militia, was assigned to 1st Brigade, 2nd Division, VI Corps at Liverpool
- 5th, 6th and 7th Royal Lancashire Militia formed 2nd Brigade of 3rd Division, VIII Corps at Melrose, Scottish Borders

The Childers Reforms of 1881 completed the process by incorporating the militia battalions into the expanded county regiments:

- 1st Royal Lancashire Militia (The Duke of Lancaster's Own) became 3rd and 4th Bns, King's Own (Royal Lancaster Regiment) at Lancaster
- 2nd Royal Lancashire Militia (The Duke of Lancaster's Own Rifles) became 3rd and 4th (briefly 5th and 6th) Bns, King's (Liverpool Regiment)
- 3rd Royal Lancashire Militia (The Duke of Lancaster's Own) became 3rd Bn and 4th Bns, Loyal North Lancashire Regiment at Preston (4th Bn disbanded 1896)
- 4th Royal Lancashire Militia (The Duke of Lancaster's Own Light Infantry) became 3rd Bn, Prince of Wales's Volunteers (South Lancashire Regiment) at Warrington
- 5th Royal Lancashire became 3rd Bn East Lancashire Regiment at Burnley
- 6th Royal Lancashire became 3rd and 4th Bns (5th and 6th Bns from February 1900) Manchester Regiment
- 7th Royal Lancashire (Rifles) became 3rd (and 4th from 1891) Bns Lancashire Fusiliers (5th and 6th Bns from April 1898) at Bury

The militia artillery was reorganised into 11 divisions of garrison artillery in 1882, and the RLMA became the 2nd Brigade, Lancashire Division, RA (the 1st Brigade comprised the regular RA units of the division). When the Lancashire Division was abolished in 1889 the title was altered to the Lancashire Artillery (Southern Division) RA. The unit's HQ transferred from Liverpool to Seaforth in 1889.

Although Cardwell's army corps scheme had been abandoned, the Stanhope Memorandum of 1888 proposed that the home defence army should consist of three corps, of which the first two would be regular, and the bulk of the third would be militia, while the rest of the militia and the volunteers would be assigned to fixed defences round London and the seaports.

=== Second Boer War ===
After the disasters of Black Week at the start of the Second Boer War in December 1899, most of the regular army was sent to South Africa, followed by many militia reservists as reinforcements. Militia units were embodied to replace them for home defence and a number volunteered for active service or to garrison overseas stations. At the same time, some of the regiments recruited from large urban areas such as Liverpool added two new Regular battalions, so the 3rd and 4th (Militia) battalions of the King's (Liverpool) Regiment and the Manchester Regiment were each renumbered 5th and 6th. The embodiments of the militia battalions of Lancashire regiments were as follows:

- King's Own (Royal Lancaster Regiment)
  - 3rd Bn: 23 January 1900 to 5 February 1902
  - 4th Bn: 13 December 1899 to 3 August 1901
- King's (Liverpool Regiment)
  - 5th Bn: 23 January to 16 October 1900
  - 6th Bn: 3 May to 1 November 1900 and 6 January to 15 September 1902
- Lancashire Fusiliers
  - 5th Bn: 23 January to 17 October 1900 and 6 May 1901 to 25 July 1902
  - 6th Bn: 13 December 1899 to 14 October 1901
- East Lancashire Regiment
  - 3rd Bn: 24 January 1900 to 25 May 1902
- Prince of Wales's Volunteers (South Lancashire Regiment)
  - 3rd Bn: 13 December 1899 to 3 August 1901
- Loyal North Lancashire Regiment
  - 3rd Bn: 13 December 1899 to 15 March 1902
- Manchester Regiment
  - 5th Bn: 5 May to 20 October 1900 and 6 May 1901 to 28 July 1902
  - 6th Bn: 4 May to 18 October 1900 and 6 January 1901 to 30 September 1902
- Lancashire Artillery: 3 May to 11 October 1900

All the infantry battalions saw active service in South Africa and received the battle honour. In addition the 3rd Bn Loyals served in the garrison of Malta for a year before going to South Africa, and received the Mediterranean battle honour.

== Special Reserve ==
After the Boer War, the future of the Militia was called into question. There were moves to reform the Auxiliary Forces (Militia, Yeomanry and Volunteers) to take their place in the six army corps proposed by St John Brodrick as Secretary of State for War. Some batteries of militia garrison artillery were to be converted to Royal Field Artillery (RFA). However, little of Brodrick's scheme was carried out.

The only RFA militia unit actually formed was the Lancashire RFA (M) as a new brigade of three batteries at Preston on 6 May 1901. The commanding officer was a regular officer of the RFA and the unit had a larger cadre of regular instructors, gunners and drivers than normal for a militia unit, amounting to 25 per cent of its total strength. The unit trained for two months each year on Salisbury Plain, and that degree of commitment made it difficult to obtain part-time junior officers. The rest of the militia artillery formally became part of the Royal Garrison Artillery (RGA), the unit at Seaforth taking the title of Lancashire RGA (M).

Under the sweeping Haldane Reforms of 1908, the Militia was replaced by the Special Reserve, a semi-professional force similar to the previous Militia Reserve, whose role was to provide reinforcement drafts for regular units serving overseas in wartime. All the Lancashire militia battalions (except the 4th Bn Kings Own (Royal Lancaster), which disbanded on 1 August 1908) transferred to the SR and were subtitled 'Reserve' (or 'Extra Reserve' in the case of 4th battalions).

Although the majority of its members volunteered to transfer to the SR, the Lancashire RFA was disbanded in 1909 along with all the RGA militia units. Instead the men of the RFA Special Reserve would form Brigade Ammunition Columns for the Regular RFA brigades on the outbreak of war.

=== World War I ===
The Special Reserve was embodied on the outbreak of World War I on 4 August 1914 and the battalions proceeded to their war stations. All but one of them then carried out their dual tasks of garrison duties and preparing reinforcement drafts of regular reservists, special reservists, recruits and returning wounded for the regular battalions serving overseas. They also formed reserve battalions to carry out the same role for the 'Kitchener's Army' battalions. They were demobilised in 1919.

- 3rd (Reserve) Bn, King's Own (Royal Lancaster Regiment) served at Saltash and Sunderland in 1914, then at Plymouth 1915–17, and finally in the Harwich Garrison; also formed 10th (Reserve) Bn
- 3rd (Reserve) Bn, King's (Liverpool Regiment) served at Hightown in 1914, then at Pembroke Dock 1915–17, and finally at Cork in Ireland; also formed 15th (Reserve) Bn
- 3rd (Reserve) Bn, Lancashire Fusiliers, served in Hull in 1914–16 and then at Withernsea in the Humber Garrison, where it remained; also formed 15th (Reserve) Bn
- 4th (Extra Reserve) Bn, Lancashire Fusiliers, served at Barrow-in-Furness in 1914–16 and then at Barry in South Wales in the Severn Garrison, where it remained
- 3rd (Reserve) Bn, East Lancashire Regiment, served at Plymouth 1914–17, then at Saltburn in the Tees Garrison, where it remained; also formed 13th (Reserve) Bn
- 3rd (Reserve) Bn, Prince of Wales's Volunteers (South Lancashire Regiment), served at Crosby 1914–17, then Barrow-in-Furness in the Barrow Garrison until the end of the war. In 1919 it served in Dublin during the Irish Partition crisis. Also formed 10th (Reserve) Bn
- 3rd (Reserve) Bn, Loyal North Lancashire Regiment, served at Felixstowe in the Harwich Garrison throughout the war; also formed 11th (Reserve) Bn
- 3rd (Reserve) and 4th (Extra Reserve) Bns, Manchester Regiment, both served in the Humber Garrison throughout the war; also formed 14th (Reserve) Bn

==== Western Front ====
The one Lancashire Special Reserve battalion that saw active service was the 4th Bn King's (Liverpool Regiment) – possibly because one of that regiment's regular battalions spent the war in India and did not require so many reinforcements. It went to the Western Front in March 1915, joining the 3rd (Lahore) Division in the Indian Corps and serving with it at the Second Battle of Ypres. Early in 1916 the battalion joined 33rd Division, fighting with it on the Somme, at Arras, and in the Battle of Polygon Wood. It fought against the German spring offensive in 1918, and participated in the Allies' final Hundred Days Offensive to the end of the war.

=== Postwar ===
The SR resumed its old title of Militia in 1921 and then became the Supplementary Reserve in 1924, but almost all militia battalions remained in abeyance after World War I. Until 1939 they continued to appear in the Army List, but they were not activated during World War II and were all formally disbanded in April 1953.

== Precedence ==
In September 1759 it was ordered that militia regiments on service were to take precedence from the date of their arrival in camp. In 1760 this was altered to a system of drawing lots where regiments did duty together. During the War of American Independence the counties were given an order of precedence determined by ballot each year. For the Lancashire Militia the positions were:

- 38th on 1 June 1778
- 43rd on 12 May 1779
- 30th on 6 May 1780
- 12th on 28 April 1781
- 32nd on 7 May 1782

The militia order of precedence balloted for in 1793 (Lancashire was 37th) remained in force throughout the French Revolutionary War: this covered all the regiments in the county. Another ballot for precedence took place at the start of the Napoleonic War, when Lancashire was 52nd. This order continued until 1833. In that year the King drew the lots for individual regiments and the resulting list remained in force with minor amendments until the end of the militia. The regiments raised before the peace of 1763 took the first 47 places, those formed after 1793 took 68 and above; the Lancashire regiments were placed as follows;

- 1st RLM 45th
- 2nd RLM 113th
- 3rd RLM 125th

Formally, the regiments became the '45th, or 1st Royal Lancashire Militia' etc, but most regiments paid little notice to the additional number. With the increase in militia units, including militia artillery, the list of precedence was revised in 1855:

- RLMA: 19th (among artillery militia)
- 1st RLM: 45th (unchanged)
- 2nd RLM: 113th (unchanged)
- 3rd RLM: 125th (unchanged)
- 4th RLM: 84th
- 5th RLM: 135th
- 6th RLM: 82nd
- 7th RLM: 130th

== See also ==
- Trained Bands
- Militia (English)
- Militia (Great Britain)
- Militia (United Kingdom)
- Special Reserve
- 1st Royal Lancashire Militia (The Duke of Lancaster's Own)
- 2nd Royal Lancashire Militia (The Duke of Lancaster's Own Rifles)
- 3rd Royal Lancashire Militia (The Duke of Lancaster's Own)
- 4th Royal Lancashire Militia (The Duke of Lancaster's Own Light Infantry)
- 5th Royal Lancashire Militia
- 6th Royal Lancashire Militia
- 7th Royal Lancashire Militia (Rifles)
- Royal Lancashire Militia Artillery
