= 4th Royal Lancashire Militia (The Duke of Lancaster's Own Light Infantry) =

Auxiliary unit of the British Army

4th Royal Lancashire Militia (The Duke of Lancaster's Own Light Infantry) 3rd Bn Prince of Wales's Volunteers (South Lancashire Regiment)
- Active: 22 March 1853–April 1953
- Country: United Kingdom
- Branch: Militia/Special Reserve
- Role: Infantry
- Size: 1 Battalion
- Garrison/HQ: Orford Barracks, Warrington
- Engagements: Second Boer War

The 4th Royal Lancashire Militia (The Duke of Lancaster's Own Light Infantry) was an auxiliary (Note: It is incorrect to describe the British Militia as 'irregular': throughout their history they were equipped and trained exactly like the line regiments of the regular army, and once embodied in time of war they were fulltime professional soldiers for the duration of their enlistment.) regiment raised in the county of Lancashire in North West England just before the Crimean War. It later became part of the South Lancashire Regiment. Although primarily intended for home defence, it saw considerable active service during the Second Boer War. After conversion to the Special Reserve (SR) under the Haldane Reforms it supplied reinforcements to the fighting battalions during World War I and carried out internal security duties in Ireland. After a shadowy postwar existence the unit was finally disbanded in 1953.

== Background ==
The universal obligation to military service in the Shire levy was long established in England and its legal basis was updated by two acts of 1557 (4 & 5 Ph. & M. cc. 2 and 3), which placed selected men, the 'trained bands', under the command of Lords Lieutenant appointed by the monarch. This is seen as the starting date for the organised county militia in England. It was an important element in the country's defence at the time of the Spanish Armada in the 1580s, and control of the militia was one of the areas of dispute between King Charles I and Parliament that led to the English Civil War. The English Militia was re-established under local control in 1662 after the Restoration of the monarchy, and the Lancashire Militia fought in King William III's campaign in Ireland in 1690–91, and against the Jacobite Risings in 1715 and 1745. However, between periods of national emergency the militia was regularly allowed to decline.

Under threat of French invasion during the Seven Years' War a series of Militia Acts from 1757 reorganised the county militia regiments, the men being conscripted by means of parish ballots (paid substitutes were permitted) to serve for three years. In 1760 Lancashire's quota was set at 800 men in one regiment, which received the title Royal Lancashire Militia in 1761. These reformed regiments were 'embodied' for permanent service in home defence until the end of the Seven Years' War and again during the War of American Independence. In peacetime they assembled for 28 days' annual training. The militia were re-embodied shortly before Revolutionary France declared war on Britain on 1 February 1793.

== French wars ==
Lancashire's militia quota set in 1760 was small in proportion to its population, which soared during the Industrial Revolution. By 1796 it represented only one man in every 43 of those eligible. But in that year an additional ballot was carried out to raise men for the 'Supplementary Militia' to reinforce the standing militia regiments and to form additional temporary regiments. Lancashire's quota was increased to five regiments, and recruitment became difficult. The 3rd Royal Lancashire Supplementary Militia was raised on 3 March 1797 under the command of Colonel Le Gendre Pierce Starkie of Huntroyde Hall. The regiment may have assembled nine companies but it never reached full establishment and attempts to convert it into a permanent 4th Royal Lancashire Militia failed. The supplementary militia was abolished in 1799, the remaining balloted men in Lancashire being distributed to the 1st, 2nd and 3rd Royal Lancashire Militia to fill vacancies.

During the French wars, the militia were embodied for a whole generation, and became regiments of full-time professional soldiers (though restricted to service in the British Isles), which the regular army increasingly saw as a prime source of recruits. They served in coast defences, manning garrisons, guarding prisoners of war, and for internal security, such as the time of the Luddite disturbances. The three regiments of Lancashire militia were serving in Ireland during the final Waterloo campaign and were finally disembodied in 1816. Once again, the militia was allowed to decline in the years of the long peace that followed. In 1831 King William IV bestowed on the three Lancashire Militia Regiments the additional title The Duke of Lancaster's Own. (Note: The monarch (of either sex) also being Duke of Lancaster.)

== 4th Royal Lancashire Militia ==
The long-standing Militia of the United Kingdom was revived by the Militia Act 1852, enacted during a period of international tension. As before, units were raised and administered on a county basis, and filled by voluntary enlistment (although conscription by means of the militia ballot might be used if the counties failed to meet their quotas). Training was for 56 days on enlistment, then for 21–28 days per year, during which the men received full army pay. Under the Act, militia units could be embodied by Royal Proclamation for full-time service in three circumstances:

1. 'Whenever a state of war exists between Her Majesty and any foreign power'.
2. 'In all cases of invasion or upon imminent danger thereof'.
3. 'In all cases of rebellion or insurrection'.

With the threat of war against Russia, the three Lancashire regiments were ordered to recruit up to their full establishment of 1200 men. Additional infantry and artillery militia regiments were also formed in Lancashire at this time including the 4th Duke of Lancaster's Own Light Infantry raised at Warrington (Note: Then in Lancashire, now in Cheshire.) on 22 March 1853 under the command of Lieutenant-Colonel Commandant John Ireland Blackburne of Hale Hall, a former captain in the 5th Dragoon Guards. The new unit was retitled the 4th Royal Lancashire Militia (The Duke of Lancaster's Own Light Infantry) (4th RLM) a month later. Soon there were seven militia infantry regiments in Lancashire, each with a defined recruiting area after 1855: the 4th at Warrington also recruited from Liverpool, St Helens and Wigan.

=== Crimea and Indian Mutiny ===
War having broken out with Russia in 1854 and an expeditionary force sent to the Crimea, the militia were called out for home defence and service in overseas garrisons. The 4th RLM was embodied on 8 December 1854 and served at Berwick-upon-Tweed and Edinburgh, and then crossed to Ireland, serving at Dublin and Newry. It was disembodied on 24 June 1856.

A number of militia regiments were also embodied to relieve regular troops required for India during the Indian Mutiny. The 4th RLM was one of the units called out, from 22 September 1857 to 1 April 1859, serving at Aldershot and Portsmouth.

Thereafter the militia regularly carried out their peacetime annual training. The Militia Reserve introduced in 1867 consisted of present and former militiamen who undertook to serve overseas in case of war.

=== Cardwell reforms ===
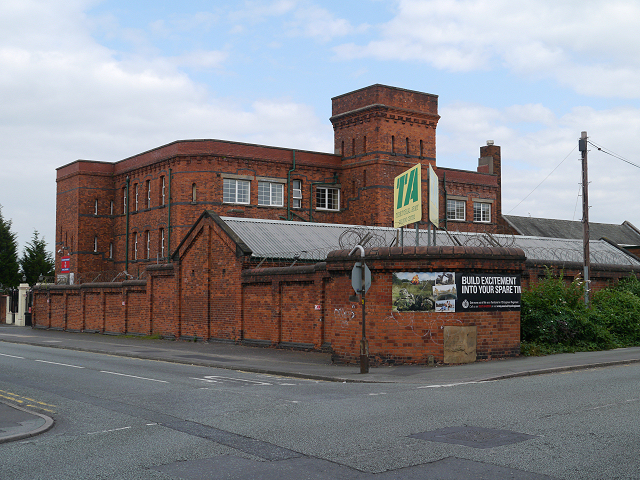
Peninsula (formerly Orford) Barracks, Warrington.

Under the 'Localisation of the Forces' scheme introduced by the Cardwell Reforms of 1872, Militia regiments were brigaded with regular and Volunteer battalions in a regimental district sharing a permanent depot at a suitable county town. Seven double-battalion or paired single-battalion regular regiments were assigned to Lancashire, and each was linked with one of the militia regiments. The militia now came under the War Office rather than their county lords lieutenant, and officers' commissions were signed by the Queen.

The 4th RLM was linked with the 40th (2nd Somersetshire) and 82nd (Prince of Wales's Volunteers) Regiments of Foot in Sub-District No 14 (Lancashire), with the depot at Orford Barracks, Warrington, (shared until 1910 with the 8th (King's) Regiment). It was intended for the 4th RLM to raise its own 2nd Battalion, but this never happened. Although often referred to as brigades, the regimental districts were purely administrative organisations, but in a continuation of the Cardwell Reforms a mobilisation scheme began to appear in the Army List from December 1875. This assigned regular and militia units to places in an order of battle of corps, divisions and brigades for the 'Active Army', even though these formations were entirely theoretical, with no staff or services assigned. The 4th Royal Lancashire Militia was assigned to 1st Brigade of 2nd Division, VI Corps. The brigade would have mustered at Liverpool in time of war.

== 3rd Battalion, South Lancashire Regiment ==
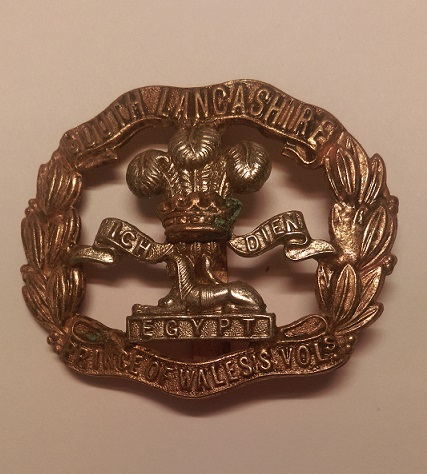
The South Lancashires' cap badge

The Childers Reforms completed the Cardwell process by incorporating the militia battalions into the expanded county regiments. On 1 July 1881 the 40th and 82nd Foot became the 1st and 2nd Battalions of the Prince of Wales's Volunteers (South Lancashire Regiment) ('PWV' or 'South Lancs') at Warrington with the 4th Royal Lancashire Militia (The Duke of Lancaster's Own Light Infantry) as its 3rd Battalion.

Militia battalions now had a large cadre of permanent staff (about 30). Around a third of the recruits and many young officers went on to join the Regular Army.

=== Second Boer War ===
After the disasters of Black Week at the start of the Second Boer War in December 1899, most of the regular army was sent to South Africa, followed by many militia reservists as reinforcements. Militia units were embodied to replace them for home defence and a number volunteered for active service or to garrison overseas stations. One of the first embodied was the 3rd South Lancashires, on 3 December 1899, and the battalion embarked for South Africa on 10 January 1900, with a strength of 24 officers and 703 other ranks (ORs) under the command of Lt-Col Robert Ireland Blackburne, son of the unit's first colonel.

The battalion arrived at Cape Town on 13 February 1900. At that time the operations to relieve the Siege of Kimberley were reaching a climax and reinforcements were being rushed to the front by rail and forced marches: 3rd South Lancashires was immediately sent up. Battalion Headquarters (HQ) and the left half-battalion went up to Naauwpoort, but the right half, following on a day behind, was stopped at Hanover Road on 17 February to meet an expected Boer attack. The rest of the battalion then came back in support, the aim being to prevent the Boers cutting the Naauwpooer–De Aar railway that provided the army's main Line of communications. Major Alexander Tarbet was posted with three companies at the Diamond Mine Kopje to guard against an attack from the east. The force at Hanover Road stood to at daybreak on 18 February, with 1500 Boers with six guns being reported nearby. During the day the South Lancs were reinforced by about 50 Royal Engineers and 100 mounted troops, and dug entrenchments to cover the town and the bridge over the river. By now the relief of Kimberley had led to the Battle of Paardeberg (18–27 February), and on 21 February the 3rd South Lancs went out to cover the successful attempt by the Victorian and Tasmanian Mounted Rifles to break through to Arundel.

After Paardeberg, the battalion moved up, HQ and Left Half to Rensburg, Right Half to Arundel, and thereafter it generally operated in these two halves. On 20 March they moved to Colesberg Junction and Colesberg respectively, then were briefly reunited at Norvalspont on 21 April. Right Half was then sent to the north bank of the Orange River while HQ and Left Half remained on the south, providing outpots of the surrounding kopjes and providing working parties to help repair the railway bridge. On 25 April Lt-Col Blackbune was invalided (he did not return for seven months) and the command devolved on Maj Montague Hall. Major Tarbet remained in command on the south bank when HQ crossed on 27 May and moved into 'Lancashire Fort' and the other defences on that side. On 1 August part of the battalion moved to Springfontein, followed by HQ and the rest of the battalion.

At the beginning of October there were indications that the Boers were moving south, and on 6 October parties were sent out to protect the railway north and south of Springfontein. Some parties were fired on, and next day the commandant of Springfontein took out about 10 men of the 3rd South Lancs under Maj Tarbet and Capt Vaughan, with a howitzer section of 87th Battery, Royal Artillery, and some Mounted infantry (MI) to destroy Pretorius's Farm. On 13 October two patrols from the battalion's MI company at Jagersfontein converged on another farm house known to be frequented by the Boers and came under fire, suffering some casualties. Jagersfontein itself was then summoned to surrender by Commandant Pretorius, but Maj Tarbet brought up reinforcements and took command. The MI Company continued to defend Jagersfontein and Fauresmith. From 13 October to 6 November there were nightly attacks on the railway, which had to be repaired by working parties, and the trenches were occupied each night. On 25 October an attempt against the Knilfontein bridge was repelled after a short fight. On 11 November D Company at Kruger's Siding was summoned to surrender by Commandant Gideon Scheepers and was attacked but the Boers were driven off by two companies of the Grenadier Guards and an armoured train.

Battalion HQ remained at Springfontein until July 1901. Lieutenant-Col Blackburne returned to the command on 23 November and shortly afterwards Maj Hall took over as commandant of the town. During the hunt for Christiaan de Wet in February 1901, the 3rd South Lancs captured his scout crossing the railway between Springfontein and Jagersfontein, and on 9 February De Wet's column was engaged by the MI from Jagersfontein and an armoured train as it crossed the railway 6 miles (9.7 km) north of Springfontein. Shortly afterwards a 45 miles (72 km) line of blockhouses was built along the line, which proved impenetrable to the Boer Commandos; none of these posts was ever lost by the South Lancs.

The battalion was relieved and left Cape Town for England on 3 July 1901, arriving home on 2 August. It was disembodied the next day. For its service the battalion was awarded the Battle honour South Africa 1900–01 and all the participants received the Queen's South Africa Medal with the clasps for 'Cape Colony', 'Orange Free State' and 'South Africa 1901'. Lieutenant-Col Blackburne was awarded a CB and Majors Hall and Tarbet each received the DSO.

== Special Reserve ==
After the Boer War, the future of the Militia was called into question. There were moves to reform the Auxiliary Forces (Militia, Yeomanry and Volunteers) to take their place in the six army corps proposed by St John Brodrick as Secretary of State for War. However, little of Brodrick's scheme was carried out.

Under the sweeping Haldane Reforms of 1908, the Militia was replaced by the Special Reserve, a semi-professional force similar to the previous Militia Reserve, whose role was to provide reinforcement drafts for regular units serving overseas in wartime. The battalion became the 3rd (Reserve) Battalion, Prince of Wales's Volunteers (South Lancashire Regiment), on 27 July 1908.

== World War I ==
=== 3rd (Reserve) Battalion ===
The Special Reserve was mobilised on the outbreak of World War I on 4 August 1914 and 3rd Bn South Lancashire embodied at Warrington under the command of Lt-Col John Vaughan and proceeded to its war station at Crosby. It carried out the dual tasks of garrison duties and preparing reinforcement drafts of regular reservists, special reservists, recruits and returning wounded for the regular battalions serving overseas. The 1st Bn remained in India throughout the war but the 2nd Bn spent the whole war fighting on the Western Front. In September and October 1914 the 3rd Bn formed 10th (Service) Battalion at Crosby for 'Kitchener's Army units (see below). In March 1917 the 3rd Bn moved to Barrow-in-Furness in the Barrow Garrison until the end of the war.

However, after the Armistice with Germany the battalion went to Ireland and in 1919 it was stationed in Dublin carrying out duties in support of the civil power during the Partition crisis. The battalion was disembodied on 13 October 1919, when the remaining personnel were posted to the 1st Bn.

=== 10th (Reserve) Battalion ===
After Lord Kitchener issued his call for volunteers in August 1914, the battalions of the 1st, 2nd and 3rd New Armies ('K1', 'K2' and 'K3' of 'Kitchener's Army') were quickly formed at the regimental depots. The SR battalions also swelled with new recruits and were soon well above their establishment strength. On 8 October 1914 each SR battalion was ordered to use the surplus to form a service battalion of the 4th New Army ('K4'). Accordingly, the 3rd (Reserve) Bn formed the 10th (Service) Bn at Crosby. It was assigned to 105th Brigade of 35th Division and began training for active service. By December it was stationed at Heswall. On 10 April 1915 the War Office decided to convert the K4 battalions into 2nd Reserve units, providing drafts for the K1–K3 battalions in the same way that the SR was doing for the Regular battalions. The battalion became 10th (Reserve) Bn in 11th Reserve Brigade, where it trained drafts for the 6th, 7th, 8th and 9th (Service) Bns of the South Lancs. In July 1915 it moved to Kinmel Camp, and then in August to Prees Heath Camp. On 1 September 1916 the 2nd Reserve battalions were transferred to the Training Reserve (TR) and the battalion was redesignated 51st Training Reserve Bn, still in 11th Reserve Bde at Prees Heath. The training staff retained their South Lancs badges. On 9 July 1917 it became 229th (Infantry) Battalion, Training Reserve, and it moved to Southwold in Suffolk to join 203rd Brigade in 68th Division. On 1 November 1917 it transferred to the Manchester Regiment as 52nd (Graduated) Battalion. The battalion moved into Great Yarmouth for the winter, and then by May 1918 it was at Herringfleet, where it remained for the rest of the war. After the war it was converted into 52nd (Service) Bn of the Manchesters on 8 February 1919 and was sent to the British Army of the Rhine, where it eventually disbanded on 13 February 1920.

=== Postwar ===
The SR resumed its old title of Militia in 1921 and then became the Supplementary Reserve in 1924, but almost all militia battalions remained in abeyance after World War I. By 1939 there were no officers listed for the battalion. (Note: However, the South Lancashire Regiment did have a number of Supplementary Reserve officers Category B attached to it.) The militia were not activated during World War II and were all formally disbanded in April 1953.

== Commanders ==
The following served as commanding officer of the regiment:

- Lt-Col John Ireland Blackburne, appointed 22 March 1853, retired 11 July 1874
- Lt-Col John Southcote Mansergh, formerly of 2nd Dragoon Guards, appointed Major 31 March 1853, promoted 11 July 1874
- Lt-Col Robert Ireland Blackburne, promoted 9 December 1896, retired 7 March 1903
- Lt-Col Montague Hall, DSO, promoted 4 April 1903
- Lt-Col Charles Marson, promoted 13 October 1909
- Lt-Col John Vaughan, promoted 2 November 1912

The following served as Honorary Colonel:

- Lt-Col John Ireland Blackburne, former CO, appointed 11 July 1874, died 1893
- Lt-Col Robert Ireland Blackburne, CB, former CO, appointed 7 March 1903, continued with SR battalion 21 June 1908

== Uniforms and insignia ==
The uniform of the Royal Lancashire Militia was scarlet with the blue facings appropriate to 'Royal' regiments. The ORs' jackets of the short-lived 3rd Supplementary Militia of 1797–98 had the lace button loops arranged in threes (denoting the 3rd Regiment, as in the Brigade of Guards), while the officers' buttons had the inscription '3' over '3 * L' over 'S' within an eight-rayed Garter star. When the regiment briefly became the 4th RLM in 1799 this design changed to '4' over 'R * L' and the Garter star was surmounted by a crown.

The badge of the 4th RLM (Duke of Lancaster's Own Light Infantry) formed in 1853 was the Red Rose of Lancaster displayed between the strings of a light infantry bugle horn. The officers' shako plate of 1869–78 and helmet plate of 1878–81 carried this badge. The ORs' forage cap badge of 1874–81 and the officers' tunic buttons of 1855–81 had the letters 'RLM' over a numeral 'IV' within a crowned garter bearing the motto 'Honi soit qui mal y pense' , the whole superimposed on an eight-pointed star. The officers' waistbelt of 1855–81 was gilt with silver lettering and centre badge, the design of which was a bugle horn (without cords) surmounted by the rose with a crown above. The title on the circle was 'Royal Lancashire Light Infantry'.

When the 4th RLM joined the South Lancashires in 1881, it adopted that regiment's white facings and insignia.

== See also ==
- Militia (English)
- Militia (Great Britain)
- Militia (United Kingdom)
- Special Reserve
- Lancashire Militia
- South Lancashire Regiment
