= Sir Henry Hoghton, 6th Baronet =

Sir Henry Hoghton, 6th Baronet (1728–1795) was a British politician who sat in the House of Commons for 25 years from 1768 to 1795.

== Early life ==
Hoghton was the eldest son of Philip Hoghton and his first wife Elizabeth Slater, daughter of Thomas Slater of Denham, Lancashire, and was born on 22 October 1728. He was educated as a dissenter at Northampton academy. He married firstly Elizabeth Ashurst daughter of William Ashurst of Hedingham Castle, Essex on 23 June 1760. She died on 19 May 1761. He married secondly Fanny Booth, daughter of Daniel Booth of Hutton Hall, Essex, Governor of the Bank of England, on 8 July 1766. He succeeded his uncle Sir Henry Hoghton, 5th Baronet in the baronetcy on 23 February 1768.

== Political career ==
In the 1768 general election, Hoghton stood in a contentious contest at Preston with John Burgoyne, Lord Derby's candidate on a joint interest against the corporation. Hoghton and Burgoyne were losing in the vote of freemen, and demanded the right of the inhabitants, of whom they had a majority, to cast their vote. The mayor would only poll freemen, and on that basis declared the corporation candidates elected. After a second poll of the inhabitants came in in their favour, Burgoyne and Hoghton petitioned, and won their case with Government backing. Hoghton was therefore seated as Member of Parliament. He was returned unopposed in 1774 and won easily in contests in 1780 and 1784. He was a member of the St. Alban's Tavern group which tried to bring Pitt and Fox together. He was returned in the 1790 general election. He spoke frequently on matters relating to Lancashire, and several times tried to obtain relief for Protestant Dissenters who were disadvantaged by the Test and Corporation Acts. Nathaniel Wraxall described Hoghton in his memoires as "a rigid Presbyterian, of ample fortune, adorned with the mildest manners… [and] …without stain of any kind".

== Later life and legacy ==
Hoghton died at Walton Hall, Preston on 9 March 1795. His obituary in the Gentleman's Magazine stated "The uniform tenor of his conduct as a member of parliament for near thirty years, during which he represented the borough of Preston, was highly respectable and exemplary. His attention to his duty was unremitted. In the agitation of great political questions he did not suffer his judgment to be controlled by party sprit, but conscientiously decided as appeared to him most for the welfare of the state. To the local interests of the town he represented, and indeed to the spirit of improvement which has of late so much distinguished the whole manufacturing county of Lancaster, he approved himself at all times a zealous friend." He was succeeded in the baronetcy by his son Henry. His second son Daniel was a distinguished soldier.

Parliament of Great Britain
Preceded by Sir Peter Leicester; Sir Frank Standish	Member of Parliament for Preston; 1768–1795; With: Brigadier John Burgoyne (1768-92); William Cunliffe Shawe (1792-95)	Succeeded by William Cunliffe Shawe; Sir Henry Hoghton
Baronetage of England
Preceded by Henry Hoghton	Baronet (of Hoghton Tower); 1768-1795	Succeeded by Henry Hoghton
