= Robert Gaussen =

Robert (Bob) Gaussen is a former Produce and Grocery Industry Ombudsman appointed by the Australian Government. He served under contract to the Government for five and a half years. He is currently the managing director of Adjudicate Today and Review Today.
