= Thomas Ewer =

English politician

Thomas Ewer (died 18 January 1790) was an English politician.

He was the son of Henry Ewer of The Lea, Hertfordshire by his wife Hester Vandeput, and the brother of William Ewer (MP). He and his brother William Ewer inherited the grocery business of their uncle Charles Ewer, MP in 1742, and continued trading at his premises in London. They were also merchants trading with Turkey and Thomas became treasurer of the Turkey Company.

He was a Member (MP) of the Parliament of Great Britain for Dorchester 1789 to 1790.
