= Robert Williams (1735–1814) =

Robert Williams (23 April 1735 – 17 January 1814) was one of the oldest MPs in the Parliament of the United Kingdom, elected at 71 in the 1807 general election.

Williams was member of a Dorset family who had had a business career in London, where at age 14 he was apprenticed as a cabinet maker, branching out to fitting out East India Company ship's cabins, then graduating to ship building. He owned 14 East Indiamen ships at the time of his death. He was also senior partner in a London bank and became a director of the East India Company.

He was MP for Dorchester, which he had previously contested unsuccessfully as an independent candidate in 1806, from 1807 to 1812. He was high sheriff of Dorset in 1804.

He died in January 1814 aged 78, leaving a fortune of half-a-million pounds.
