= John Damer =

Anglo-Irish politician (1744–1776)

Hon. John Damer MP
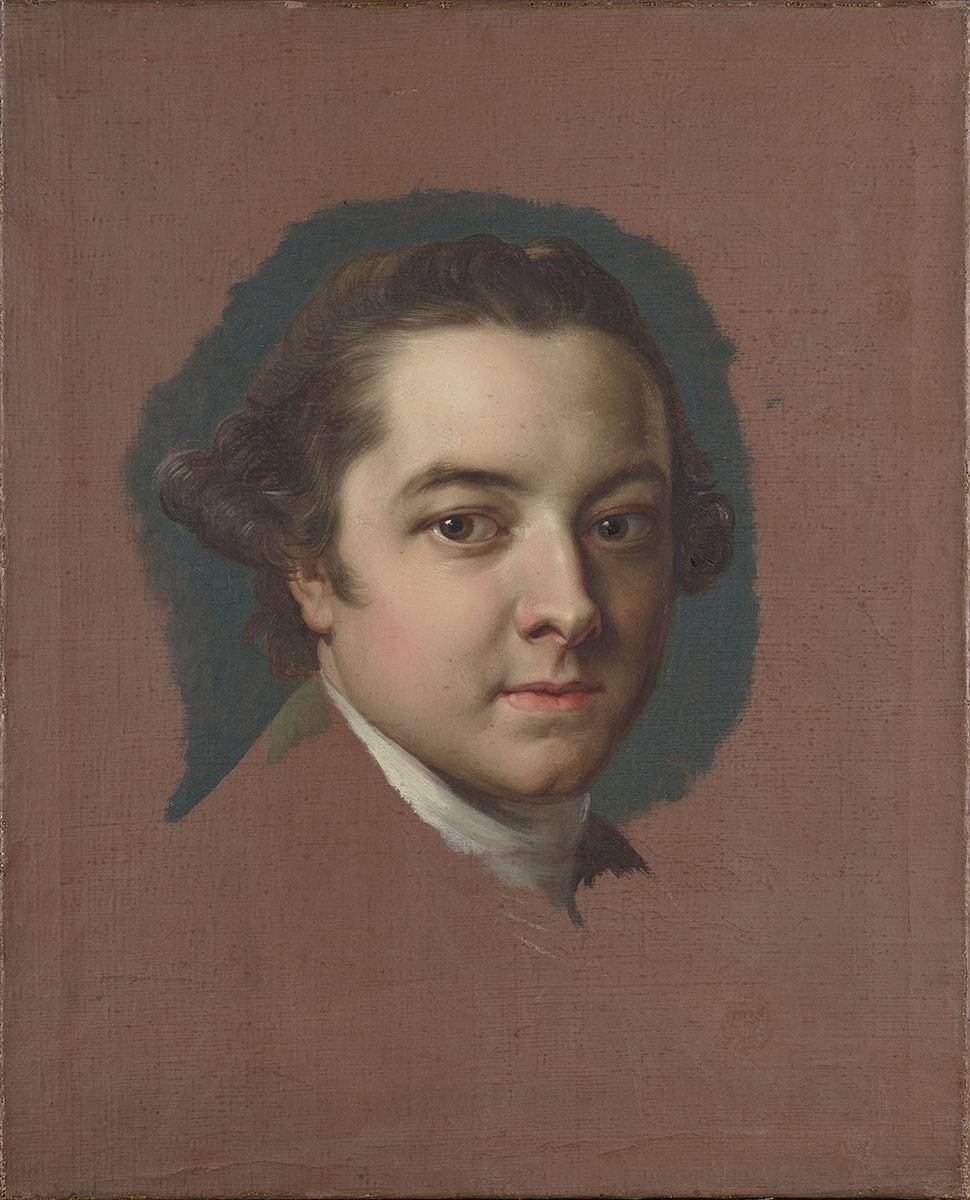
- portrait by Pompeo Batoni

Member of Parliament for Gatton
- In office 21 March 1768 – 7 October 1774

Personal details
- Born: 25 June 1744 Shronell, County Tipperary
- Died: 15 August 1776 (aged 32) Covent Garden, London
- Party: Whig
- Spouse: Anne Seymour Conway (m. 1767)
- Parent: Joseph Damer, 1st Earl of Dorchester (father)
- Education: Trinity College, Cambridge

John Damer (25 June 1744 – 15 August 1776) was an Anglo-Irish Whig politician.

== Family ==
John was the first of three sons of Joseph Damer, 1st Earl of Dorchester by the Lady Caroline Sackville. His mother was the daughter of Lionel Cranfield Sackville, 1st Duke of Dorset and his wife Elizabeth Colyear. His maternal grandmother was the daughter of Lieutenant-General Walter Philip Colyear, and the niece of David Colyear, 1st Earl of Portmore. His younger brothers were the Hon. Lionel Damer and the George Damer, 2nd Earl of Dorchester.

== Education ==
Damer was educated at Eton (1755–61) and Trinity College, Cambridge (1762).

== Marriage ==
He married the future sculptor Anne Seymour Conway, daughter of Field Marshal Rt. Hon. Henry Seymour Conway and Lady Caroline Campbell, on 14 June 1767; she separated from him seven years later.

== Political career ==
Damer was the member of parliament for Gatton (1768–1774).

== Death ==
Damer got heavily into debt and his father refused to help him financially. He shot himself on 15 August 1776 at the Bedford Arms, Covent Garden.

== Legacy ==
Damer is mentioned in the lyrics of the traditional Irish song "Limerick Rake".

Parliament of Great Britain
| Preceded by Thomas Brand; Lieutenant-Colonel Edward Harvey | Member of Parliament for Gatton; 1768–1774; With: Joseph Martin | Succeeded by Sir William Mayne; Robert Scott |
