= Thomas Foster (English politician, died 1765) =

English politician

Thomas Foster (c. 1720 – 1765), of Elim, Jamaica, and Egham House, Surrey, was an English politician.

Foster's grandfather was awarded estates in Jamaica after taking part in its capture by the British in the 1650s. Like some other Jamaican planters, Foster was a Member (MP) of the Parliament of Great Britain. He represented Bossiney (a rotten borough) 1741 and 1742 to 1747 and Dorchester 1761 to 1765.
