= Bengal Bubble of 1769 =

Overvaluation of the East India Company stock between 1757 and 1769

The Bengal Bubble, caused by the increasing overvaluation of the East India Company stock between 1757 and 1769, led to the Great East Indian Crash, a major financial crisis that occurred in 1769. The bubble and crash occurred in the wake of the conquest of Bengal by the East India Company in 1757 by Robert Clive. Following the battle, Clive and the company acquired increasing powers in Bengal, through the installation of the puppet regime of Mir Jafar, including control of the tax collection rights for the province from the weak and declining Mughal Empire. By 1769, the East India Company stock was trading at £284. By 1784, the stock had declined to £122, a fall of 55%, and a series of bailout measures and increasing control by the crown led to the demise of the company.

Several historical events, including the attack on Company holdings by Hyder Ali in 1769, the Bengal famine of 1770, and growing revelations of the company's actions, were the immediate causes of the crash, but the primary cause was the predatory governance of the province by the company, which led to the collapse of the 18th century Bengal textile industry.

In the wake of the crash and the resulting outcry in England, attempts were made to reform the company, but, due to the complicated situation in England at the time, it was only in 1784, with the passage of Pitt's India Act, that reform was seriously undertaken.
