= Bankes family =

English gentry family

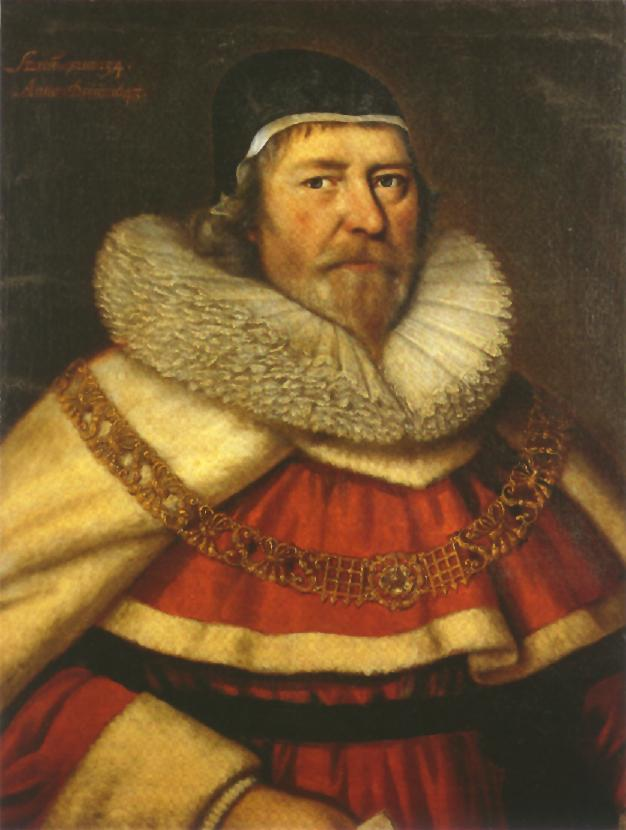
Sir John Bankes, portrait by Gilbert Jackson

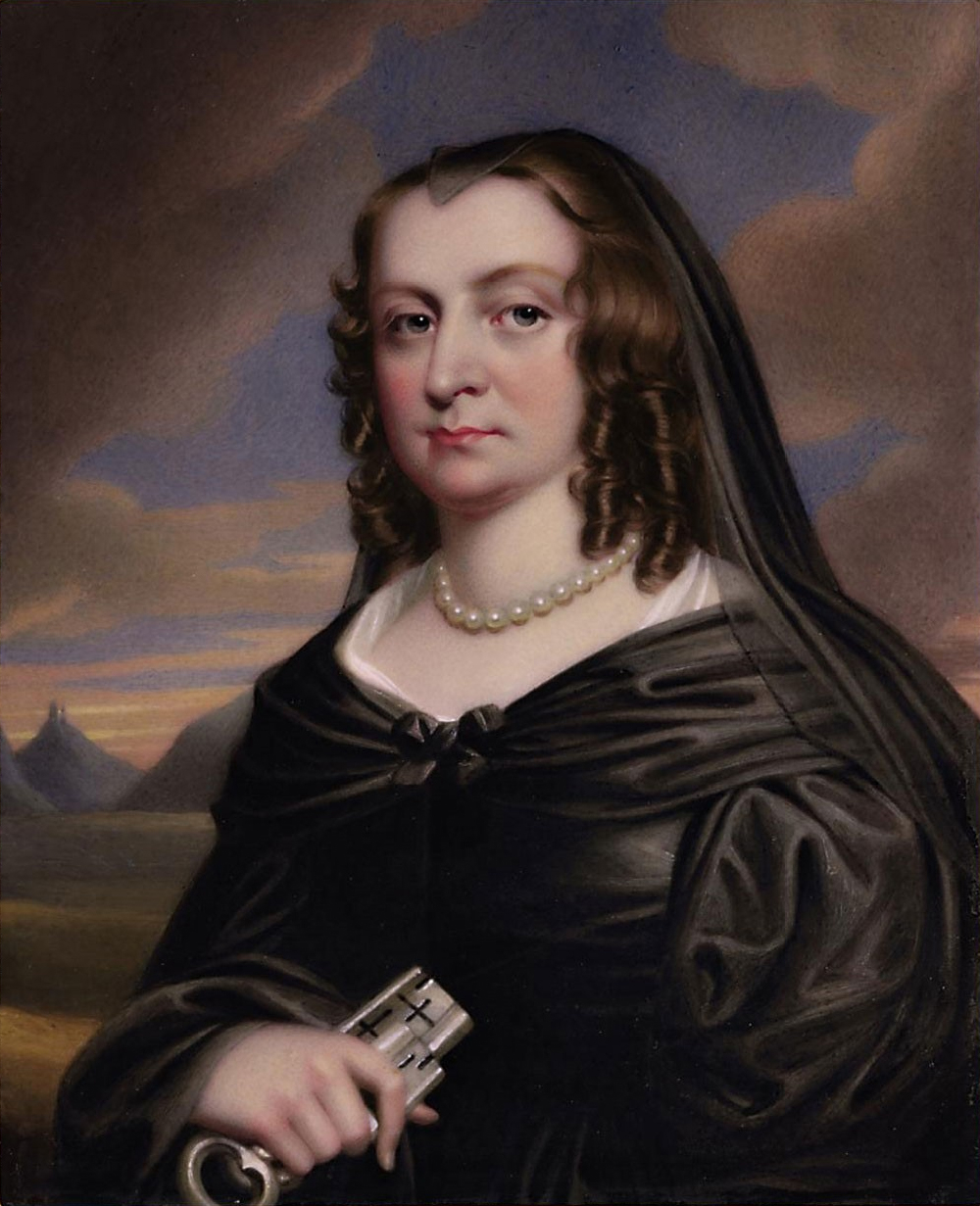
Lady Mary Bankes defended the castle during two sieges in the English Civil War.

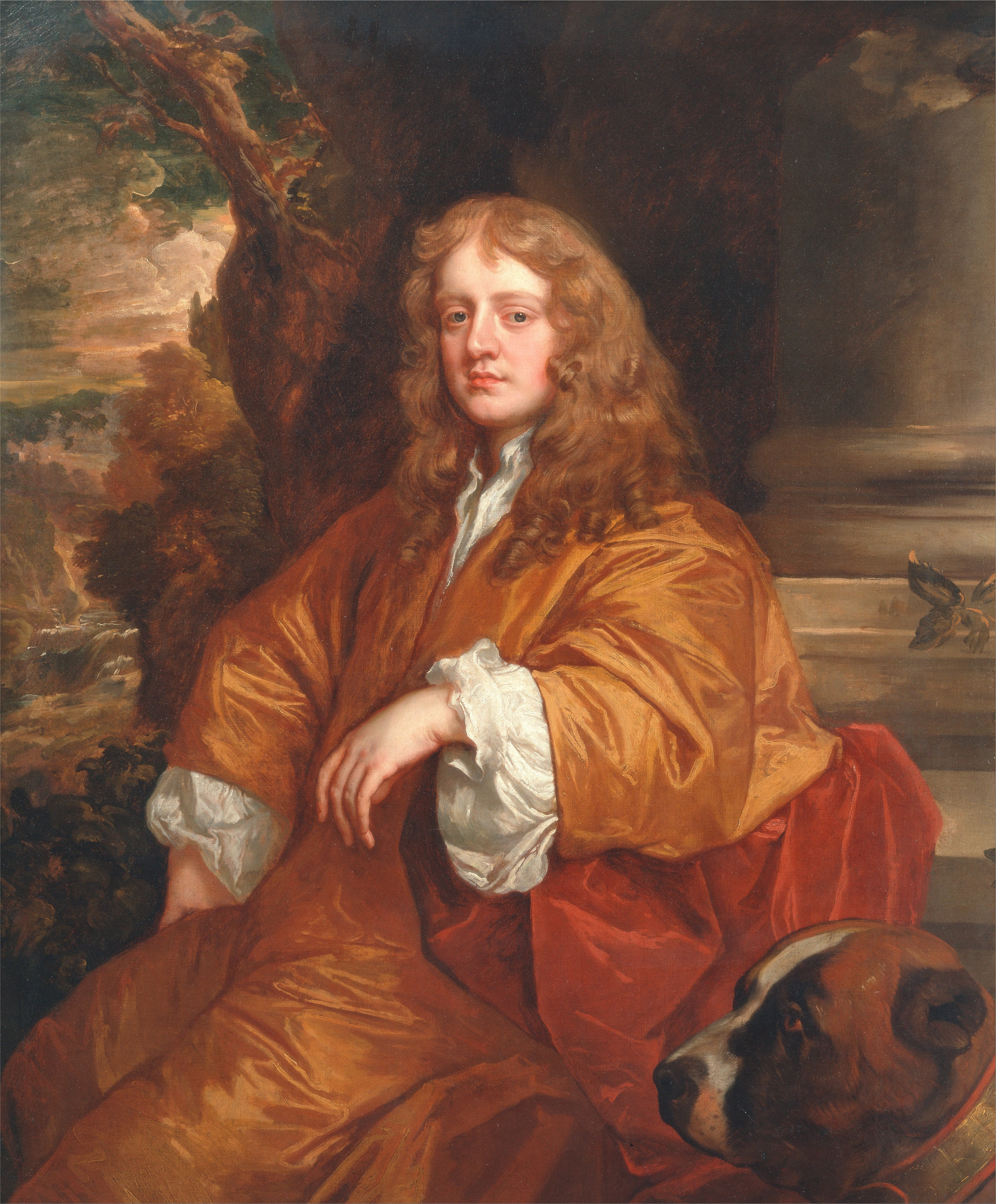
Sir Ralph Bankes, portrait by Sir Peter Lely

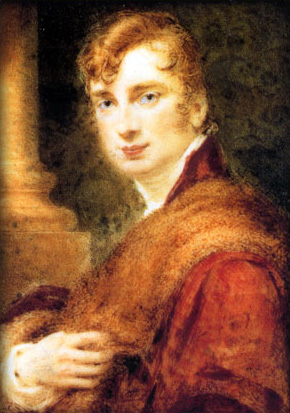
William John Bankes, portrait by George Sandars, 1812

The Bankes family were prominent landed gentry in Dorset, England, for over 400 years. They owned large portions of land throughout Dorset, including the Kingston Lacy estate and made significant contributions to the political history and development of the country. The family also had a notable book collection.

== Buildings ==
The first family seat was in Corfe Castle which was destroyed during the civil war when the Bankeses, who were cavaliers (royalist followers), were besieged by parliament forces. After the return of King Charles II the Bankeses again rose to political power. Their new home, built at Kingston Lacy has survived until the present day, under the guide of the National Trust. The family vault is located in the Church of Wimborne Minster, not far from their Kingston Lacy estate. In the late 19th century the Bankeses built a summer beach house at Studland in Dorset. The manor house as it used to be named is named is now a hotel called The Pig on the Beach. A large pub in the village, frequented by beach visitors, is known as the Bankes Arms Inn.

The family church, St Stephen's is on the far edge of the Kingston Lacy estate at Pamphill. The road up to the church is lined with a row of trees planted in 1846. The 19th century rebuild of the church replaced a decaying ruin of a church that had existed since 1229. The church has several monuments dedicated to the Bankes family, as well as a window and five pews decorated with the family coat of arms.

== Family members ==
Records go back to John Bankes, born 1569, who fathered Sir John Bankes. The most notable members of the Bankes family are as follows:

- Sir John Bankes (1589–1644) was Lord Chief Justice of the Common Pleas to Charles I and a member of the Privy Council was married to "Brave Dame" Mary Bankes. They lived in Corfe Castle, until its destruction during the civil war.
- Sir Ralph Bankes (1631–1677) was the second son of Sir John and brother of Jerome and John. Upon his father and younger brother's deaths, the estate passed to him. He was responsible for the building of the new family seat at Kingston Lacy. He was Member of Parliament (MP) for Corfe.
- John Bankes (1665–1714), son of Sir Ralph, married Lady Margaret Parker and was also MP for Corfe.
- Henry Bankes the Elder (1698–1776), son of John Bankes, married Margaret Wynne, daughter of John Wynne the Bishop of Bath and Wells and owner of Soughton Hall, Flintshire. After the death of her brother, it brought the Hall into ownership of the Bankes family.
- Henry Bankes the Younger (1757–1834) was the son of Henry Bankes the Elder. He became an MP for Corfe, an influential Tory bencher and a chief trustee of the British Museum. He was close friends with both Pitt the Younger and the Duke of Wellington. He purchased new land for the family including Whitemill in 1773.
- William John Bankes (1786–1855), son of Henry Bankes the Younger, who after meeting architect Charles Barry on his Grand Tour in Rome (later Sir Charles Barry, renowned for his rebuild of the Palace of Westminster), enlarged Soughton Hall and encased Kingston Lacy as it is today. A notable explorer and adventurer, he travelled extensively to the Orient and Egypt, and collected the largest private individual collection of Egyptian artefacts in the world. He was good friends with Lord Byron. He also served as MP for Corfe. A scandal forced his retirement from all public affairs until his death.
- Walter Ralph Bankes (1853–1904) was head of the family in the late nineteenth century. He was the father of Ralph Bankes the second and left a financial bequest of £5,000 to pay for the family church of St Stephen's Church, Pamphill. The church was eventually constructed under the leadership of his wife Henrietta Bankes and his son (see below).
- Henrietta Bankes (1867–1953), was the lady of the house during the First World War. She helped turn the majority of the servants' quarters and the out buildings into a hospital for returning injured soldiers. She also allowed the building of a small war hospital, less than a mile away on the estate. She died in 1953.
- Henry John Ralph Bankes (1902–1981) was the seven times great grand son of Sir John Bankes. He became owner of the Kingston Lacy estate on becoming 21 in 1923. He had two sisters, Daphne (1898–1967, unmarried), and Viola Florence Geraldine (1900–1989), who married Norman Bruce Hall, and was known as author Viola Bankes. Henry married in 1935 Hilary Margaret Strickland-Constable (1908–1966) and had two children, one son (John, 1937–1996) and one daughter (Mary, 1940–). Upon his death, he bequeathed Kingston Lacy and Corfe Castle to the National Trust, the largest donation the trust has ever received.

== Heraldry ==
The arms of the Bankes family of Kingston Lacy are: Sable, a cross engrailed ermine between four fleur-de-lys or (as is visible for example on a relief sculpture on a stone chimney-piece at Kingston Lacy showing the arms of William Bankes quartering Wynne and Brune). This is a differenced version of the arms of the 14th century family of Bank of Bank Newton, Craven, in the West Riding of Yorkshire, namely: Sable, a cross or between four fleurs-de-lys argent.
