= St Stephen's Church, Pamphill =

Church in Dorset, England

Coordinates: 50.8082°N 2.0180°W

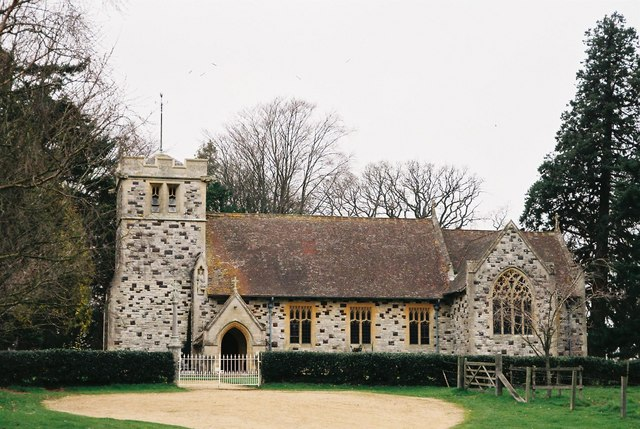
St Stephen's Church

St Stephen's is the parish church of Pamphill in Dorset, England.

The current church lies on the site of a former church dating from 1229. The current church was laid out for construction in 1846 at the end of an avenue of trees. However the actual church was not finished until 1907, in an Arts and Crafts style under the designs of architect C.E. Ponting.

It is the family church of the Bankes family of Dorset.

== History ==
John de Lacy was one of twenty-five barons charged with overseeing the observance of Magna Carta (1215). In 1230, he was given the manor of Kingston Lacy. He paid for a new church for one of the villages in his domain and in 1236 a church dedicated to St Stephen was constructed after seven years in the building process. It survived until the sixteenth century but by 1573 had been allowed to decay to such an extent that it was beyond repair and abandoned.

The current church was built with a financial bequest of £5,000 from Walter Ralph Bankes and lies in the grounds of Kingston Lacy House, now a National Trust property, near Pamphill. It was eventually completed in 1907 as a memorial to Walter Ralph Bankes. The church was constructed under the leadership of his wife Henrietta Bankes and his son Sir Walter Ralph Bankes the second.

== Architecture and features ==
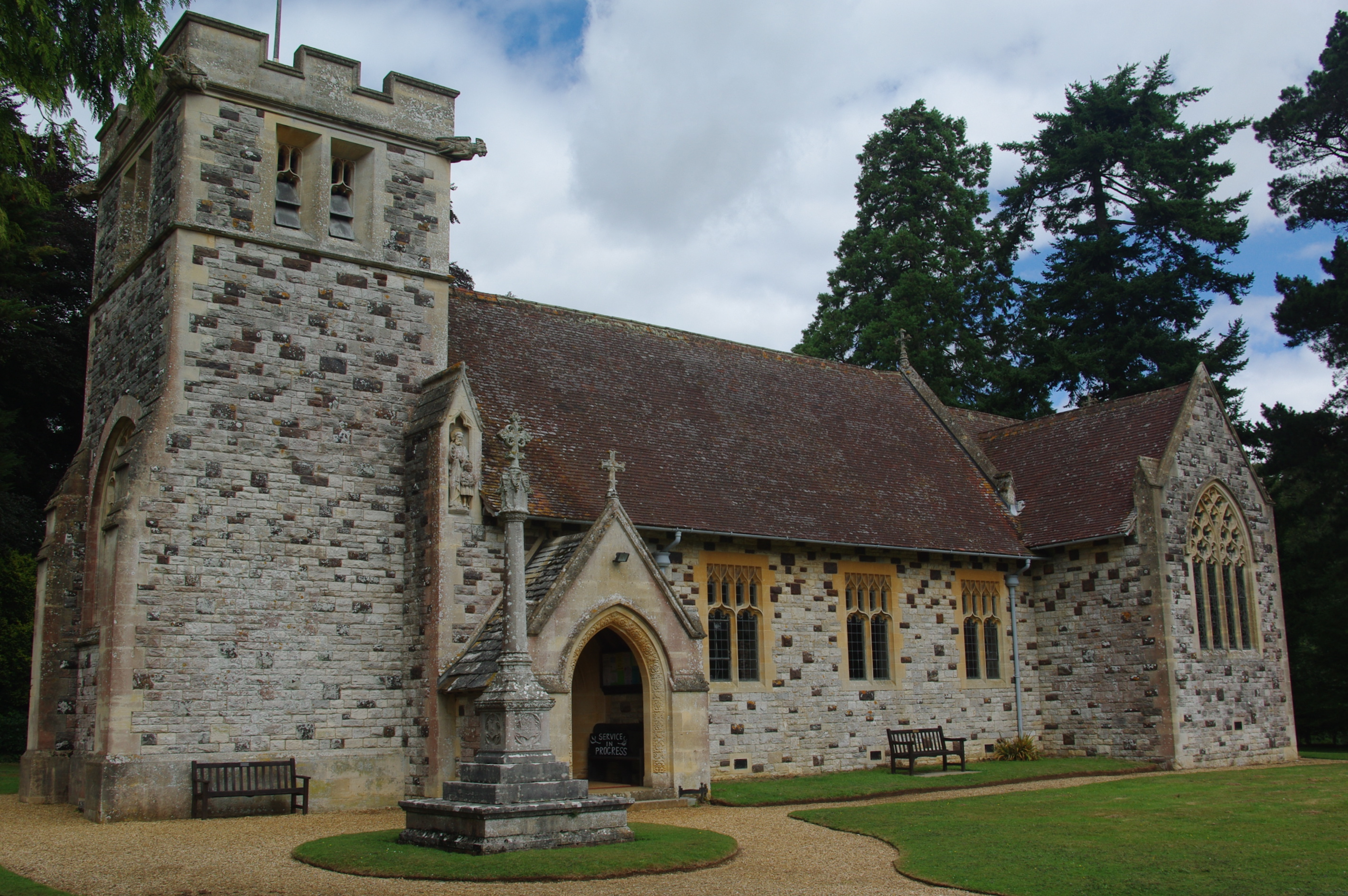
The church and cross.

The church is a good example of Arts and Crafts Gothic architecture. There is a forty-foot tower. The walls are constructed from a mixture of Studland sandstone and Purbeck Stone. Attached to the tower and above the left side of the porch, with its Arts and Crafts leaf surround, is a niche containing a statue by Palmer of St Stephen with his hand on the head of a small boy. The boy was modelled in the likeness of Ralph, Mrs Henrietta Bankes' son.

There is an alabaster font, supported by four angels. When it arrived in the church, it had a crack. It was returned to the makers, who replaced it with the one currently in use. A notable feature inside the building is the quality of the woodwork, constructed from oak grown on the Kingston Lacy Estate. Also of note are the pews, each end of which is carved with a Bankes' family fleur-de-lys, and the choir stalls. The glittering tiled reredos is by Carters of Poole, who used 'battered brass' to form the golden wings of the angels and mother-of-pearl for their halos. On either side, it is flanked by Sanctus angels engraved directly into the stone.

The east window depicts Ralph Bankes sitting on Christ's lap with his sisters, Viola and Daphne, looking on. Mrs Bankes is reputed to have been devoted to her rather sickly son, but not to her two daughters. To the right there are further panels of Mary and Martha, the Good Shepherd and the Calming of the Storm. The small organ is by the Positive Organ Co. Immediately below the organ and attached to the wooden panelling is a record of sixteen men who did not return from the First World War; this was unveiled on 2 April 1921. The eight Bankes family pews are at the back of the church. Standing over the pew is a copy of the astronomical clock of nearby Wimborne Minster (where most of the Bankes are buried), and above and behind, the west window features the historical family armorials with a fleur de lys and the various bride's arms. Before the building of St Stephens, the window was in Wimborne Minster.

Until the building of this church, the people of Cowgrove and Pamphill had to go to Wimborne Minster for services. Initially the new church was within the parish of Wimborne Minster and not a parish in its own right, but in 1922, as a result of Mrs Bankes' efforts and her endowment of £6,000, the benefice of St Stephen's was finally established with its own vicar. The grass enclosure in which the church rests remains unconsecrated and consequently has never been used for burial. The stone cross in front of the church is a memorial to Walter Bankes, Mrs Bankes' husband and benefactor.
