= Kingston Lacy =

Country house near Wimborne Minster, Dorset, England

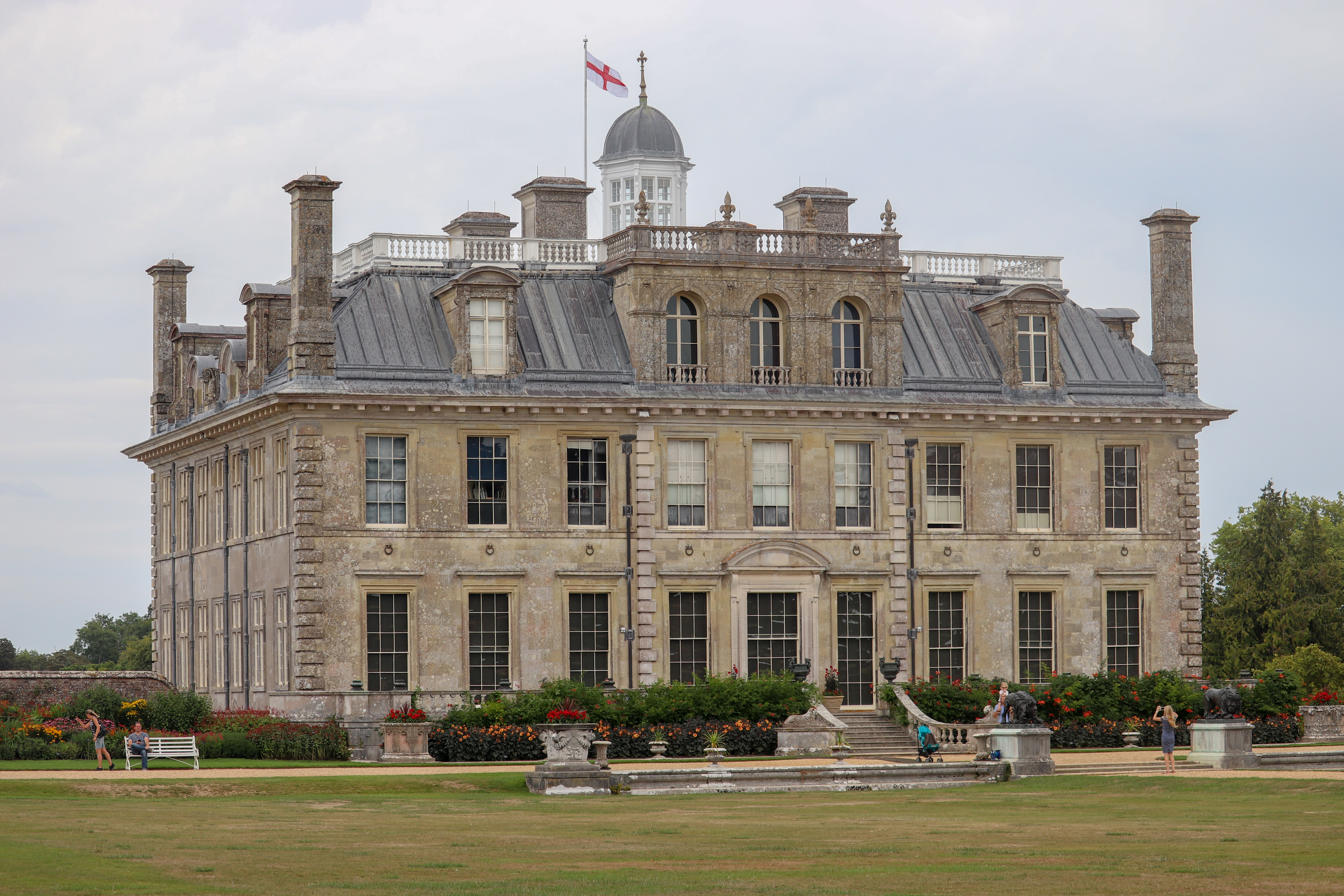
- Kingston Lacy house from the south
- Interactive map of the Kingston Lacy area
- Alternative names: Kingston Hall

General information
- Type: Country house
- Architectural style: Italianate architecture
- Location: Wimborne Minster, Dorset, England
- Coordinates: 50°48′39.39″N 2°1′56.12″W
- Construction started: 1663
- Completed: 1665
- Client: Sir John Bankes; Sir Ralph Bankes.
- Owner: National Trust

Technical details
- Structural system: Red brick, later encased in Chilmark stone
- Material: Red brick
- Floor count: 4 (2 × main floors; 1 × basement; 1 × attic)
- Grounds: 164 hectares (410 acres) (5 hectares (12 acres) of gardens and pleasure grounds; 159 hectares (390 acres) of park and other ornamented land)

Design and construction
- Architect: Roger Pratt
- Other designers: Inigo Jones (Interiors)
- Designations: Grade I listed

Renovating team
- Architect: Charles Barry

Website
- Kingston Lacy @ National Trust

Listed Building – Grade I
- Official name: Kingston Lacey House
- Designated: 18 March 1955
- Reference no.: 1119511

Kingston Lacy is a country house and estate near Wimborne Minster, Dorset, England. It was for many years the family seat of the Bankes family who lived nearby at Corfe Castle until its destruction in the English Civil War after its incumbent owners, Sir John Bankes and Dame Mary, had remained loyal to Charles I.

The house was built between 1663 and 1665 by Ralph Bankes, son of Sir John Bankes, to a design by the architect Sir Roger Pratt. It is a rectangular building with two main storeys, attics and basement, modelled on Chevening in Kent. The gardens and parkland were laid down at the same time, including some of the specimen trees that remain today. Various additions and alterations were made to the house over the years and the estate remained in the ownership of the Bankes family from the 17th to the late 20th century.

The house was designated as a Grade I listed building in 1958 and the park and gardens are included in the National Register of Historic Parks and Gardens at Grade II. The house was bequeathed to the National Trust in 1982 after the death of Henry John Ralph Bankes, along with Corfe Castle. The house and gardens are open to the public.

== History ==
The Kingston Lacy estate originally formed part of a royal estate within the manor of Wimborne. The original house stood to the north of the current house. It was built in the medieval period and was used as a hunting lodge in connection with the deer park to its northwest. Leased to those who found favour with the monarch, lessees included the de Lacys, Earls of Lincoln, who held it in addition to estates at Shapwick and Blandford Forum. In the 15th century the property was leased to John Beaufort, 1st Duke of Somerset, whose daughter Lady Margaret Beaufort, mother of Henry VII, was brought up at Kingston Lacy.

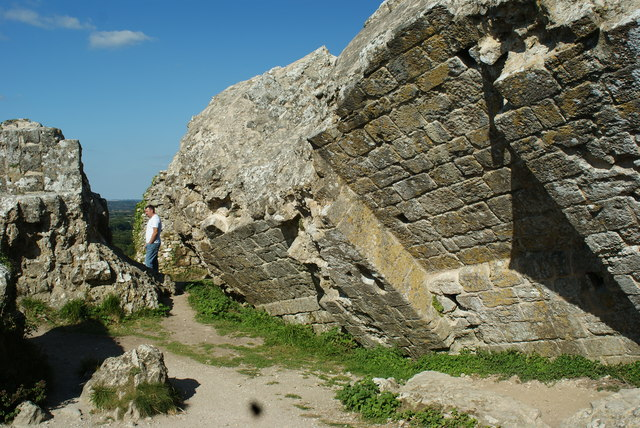
Corfe Castle was slighted, by order of parliament, in the 17th century.

By the 18th century the house was in ruins. In 1603 James I gave the lands to Sir Charles Blount. In 1636, his son sold the estate to Sir John Bankes, who had been appointed attorney general to Charles I in 1634. Sir John was born in Cumberland, but through his extensive legal works had acquired sufficient funds to purchase the Corfe estate. During the Civil War, the Bankes family remained loyal to the crown; Sir John died at Oxford in December 1644, the King having retired there for the winter.

Left to fend for herself during two sieges, his wife Mary Bankes defended Corfe Castle, but it eventually fell to the Parliamentary forces. In March 1645 Parliament voted to slight the castle, and it was left in its present ruinous state. Although deprived of their castle, the Bankes family owned some 8,000 acres (3,200 ha) of the surrounding Dorset countryside and coastline. The masonry from the destroyed castle was used by local villagers to rebuild their own residences.

Sir Ralph died in 1677, and his widow let the house to James Butler, 1st Duke of Ormond from 1686 until he died there on 21 July 1688. John Bankes the Elder regained the property in 1693, and with his wife Margaret, daughter of Sir Henry Parker of Honington Hall, completed most of his father's original development plan. In 1772 the house passed to his second son Henry who remodelled it, built a servants' wing, and enclosed the parkland for better agricultural management.

The 1784 Enclosure Act allowed Henry Bankes the Younger, grandson of Ralph Bankes, to create the current estate and parkland footprint. He demolished the hamlet of Kingston which was situated adjacent to the 16th-century Keeper's Lodge, diverted the Blandford road (now the B3082) and converted former agricultural land to parkland. He undertook further minor alterations in the 1820s, before he became a Member of Parliament for the rotten borough of Corfe Castle. He was a trustee for the British Museum and its parliamentary advocate, and some of his collections which were once part of the house, are now in the museum. Bankes entertained his friends at the house, including William Pitt the Younger and Arthur Wellesley, 1st Duke of Wellington.

Bankes' son, the explorer and adventurer William John Bankes, commissioned his friend Charles Barry to encase the red brick hall in stone, and enlarge his other property Soughton Hall. Barry remodelled Kingston Lacy between 1835 and 1838. The work involved facing the brick with Chilmark stone, adding a tall chimney at each corner, and lowering the ground level on one side to expose the basement level and form a new principal entrance. He planted beech tree avenues along the Blandford Road, of which some 2 1/4 miles (3.6 km) survives.

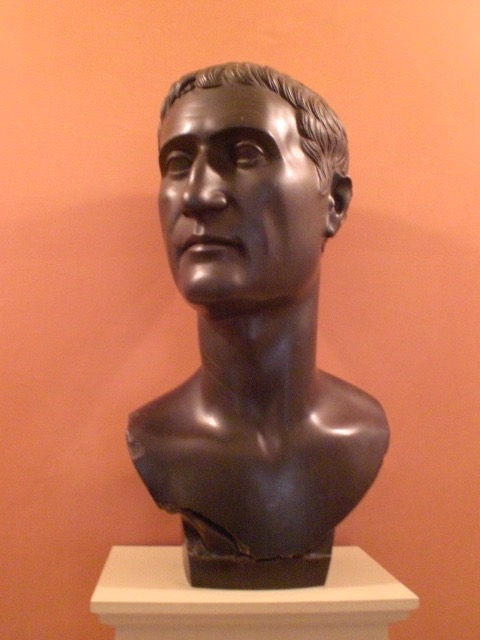
Bust of Mark Antony collected by William John Bankes exhibited at Kingston Lacy

William John Bankes collected most of the house's antiquities. He travelled extensively in the Middle East and Asia, amassing the world's largest individual collection of Ancient Egyptian antiques. Most notable is the Philae obelisk which stands prominently in the grounds of the house. When in Genoa he acquired the 1606 Portrait of Maria di Antonio Serra by Sir Peter Paul Rubens. In 1841, after being caught in a homosexual scandal that could have resulted in a trial and his execution, William John fled the country for Italy. His art collection was left at Kingston Lacy, where his notes and drawings remained for many years in a cabinet, unpublished and forgotten.

During William John's absence the estate was managed by his brother, George Bankes, who inherited it on his brother's death just a year before his own in 1857. His youngest grandson Walter Ralph inherited the estate in 1869, and later in life married Henrietta, and had a son: Henry John Ralph Bankes. After Walter's death in 1902, his widow undertook the last major developments to the estate, including construction of the church (1907), new entrance lodges (1912–13) and numerous estate cottages. In 1923 control passed to Ralph Bankes, the seven times great-grandson of the original creator. During the Second World War an extensive military encampment was established in the south-east quarter of the park, which was only restored after the National Trust took ownership. Ralph Bankes died in 1981 and the Kingston Lacy estate, including 12 working farms, and Corfe Castle were bequeathed to the National Trust. The gift was formally accepted on 19 August 1982, the largest bequest that it had ever accepted.

== Architecture ==
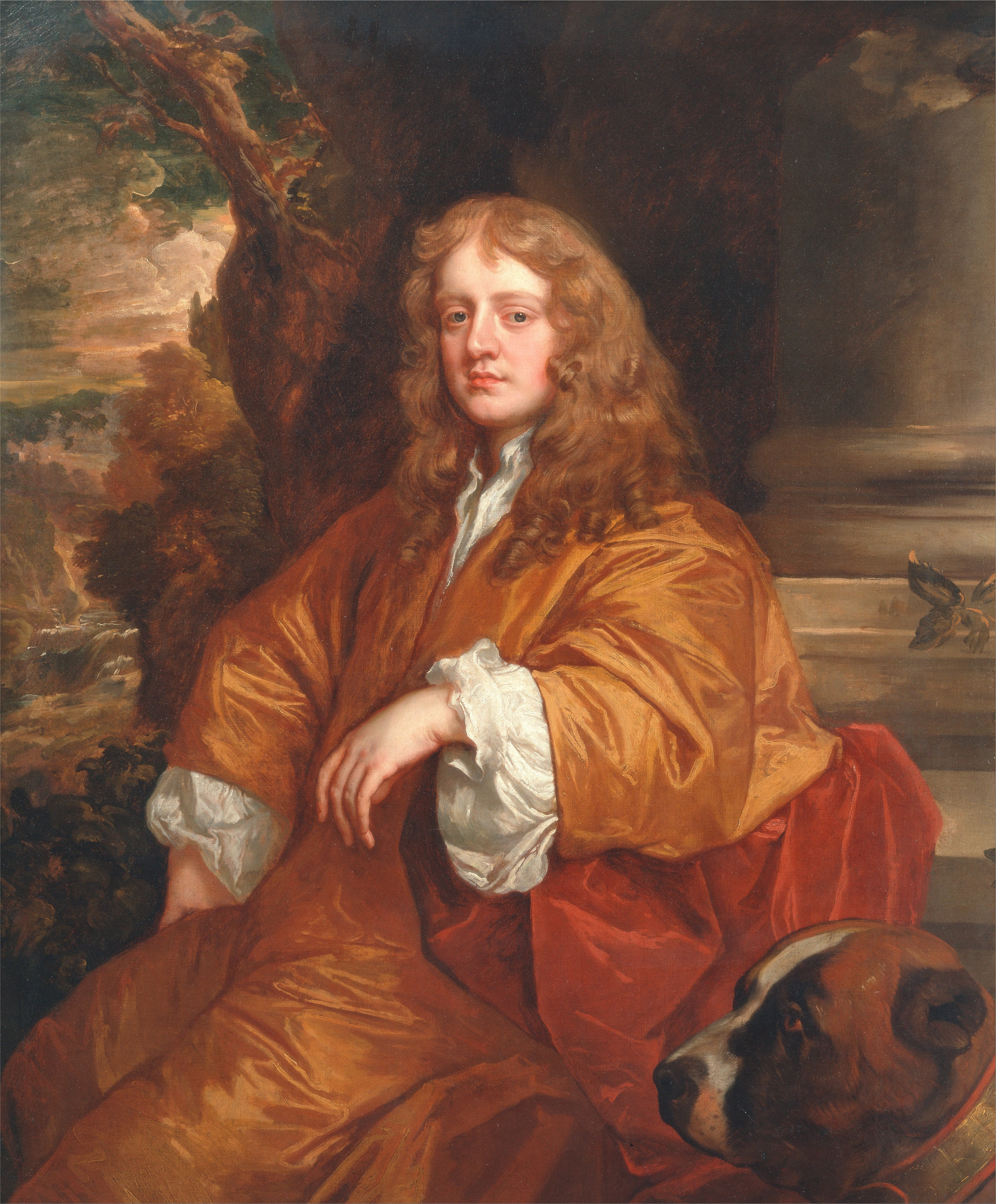
Sir Ralph Bankes, during whose life Kingston Lacy was constructed (by Sir Peter Lely)

After the restoration of the monarchy in 1660, the Bankes family regained their properties. Rather than rebuild Corfe Castle, the eldest son Ralph Bankes built a house on their other Dorset estate near Wimborne Minster. In 1663, he commissioned Sir Roger Pratt to design a new house to be known as Kingston Hall on the current site, based on Clarendon House which he had visited several times. Construction started the same year, and was completed by 1665.

The design, like Pratt's other large country house Horseheath Manor in Cambridgeshire, was much influenced by Chevening. Like that house, the hall is two storeys high, though the great stair has been moved from the centre of the house" Instead the great stair and the back stairs are situated symmetrically on either side of the hall, on the main long axis of the house.

Pratt's original plans have been lost, but extensive notes on his intentions have survived. On each of the two main floors he placed identical apartments about 20 ft (6 m) square at the four corners, each with two 10 ft (3 m) square closets at their outer end. This provided flexibility of use for the rooms. Two of the inner closets housed servants' stairs. The two ends of the bedroom floor were connected by a balcony supported by columns which may have served the additional purpose of helping support the north side of the cupola.

Built of red brick with Chilmark and Portland stone dressings, the house has a compact, rectangular plan and has two main floors, plus a basement and an attic floor lit by dormer windows. On the south façade, there are eight casement windows in the basement and nine sash windows on each of the ground floor and first floor. The bay with the three central windows projects forwards slightly, and the central ground floor window is pedimented. The lead-covered hipped roof has a central flat section, surrounded by a balustrade with a cupola rising from its centre. The dormer windows are in a central, balustraded terrace of three, with an outlying window on either side. The house is entered from the north through a later mid-19th-century porte-cochère, while to the south there is a stone-flagged terrace with balustrade extending the full width of the building, and broad shallow steps leading down to the lawns. The east façade has a triple-arched loggia with access to the garden, while to the west there is access to the later 18th-century laundry and kitchen garden.

The interiors were influenced by Inigo Jones, but executed by his heir John Webb, a fact confirmed many years later when the National Trust discovered Webb's plans during their formal takeover of the estate. The interiors mostly date from about 1835. The hall has a barrel-vaulted high ceiling with painted decoration and the dining room has panelled walls, tapestries and a decorated plaster ceiling. The library has a ceiling painting attributed to Guido Reni. The staircase is of white marble with turned balusters and a relief frieze, its ornamented ceiling being attributed to Giorgione.

Sited centrally within the 164-hectare (410-acre) grounds, externally the new house was provided with 5 hectares (12 acres) of formal gardens and pleasure grounds; some of these were enclosed by walls, while a series of wide avenues radiated throughout the surrounding 159 hectares (390 acres) of parkland. The house is a Grade I listed building having been so designated on 18 March 1955.

== Collections ==
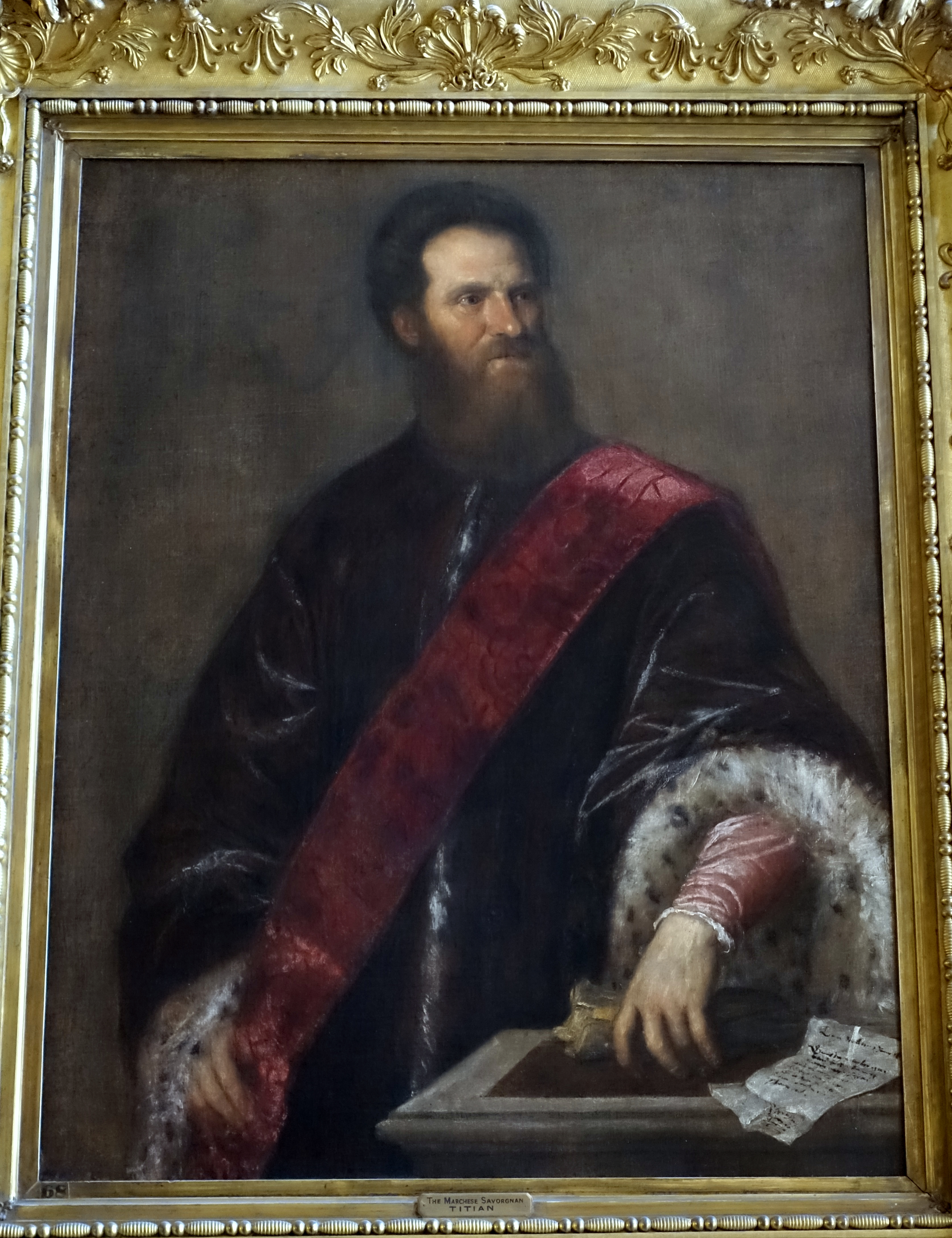
Nicolò Zen (1515-1565) by Titian

On display in the house is an important collection of fine art and antiquities built up by many generations of the Bankes family, the core having been assembled by Sir Ralph Bankes in Gray's Inn before the house was built. One of the rooms, the Spanish room (named by reason of the paintings of Bartolomé Esteban Murillo which hang there), has walls hung with gilded leather. It was recently restored at a cost of several hundred thousand pounds over a five-year period. Other important collections include paintings of the Bankes family stretching back over 400 years. Other artworks include The Judgement of Solomon by Sebastiano del Piombo and works by Diego Velázquez, Anthony van Dyck, Titian and Jan Brueghel the Younger.

Apart from the Spanish Room, the library is the most atmospheric of rooms, upon the wall of which are hung the huge keys of the destroyed Corfe Castle, handed back to Mary Bankes after her defence of Corfe Castle during the Civil War. The state bedroom is extremely ornate and has housed such important guests as Kaiser Wilhelm II who stayed with the family for a week in 1907. The main staircase is beautifully carved from stone and features three huge statues which look out onto the gardens from their seats. These depict Sir John Bankes and Lady Bankes, the defenders of Corfe Castle, and their patron, Charles I.

== Gardens ==
The land surrounding Kingston Lacy was registered as being of special historic interest in the Register of Historic Parks and Gardens in 1986, it being "parkland developed in the seventeenth, late eighteenth, and nineteenth centuries, together with late nineteenth-century formal gardens and informal pleasure grounds." The estate comprises about 159 hectares (393 acres) of parkland and other ornamental land and about 5 hectares (12 acres) of gardens. The site slopes gently towards the southwest and includes the summit of the Iron Age hillfort of Badbury Rings towards its northwest extremity, and within the estate is part of the Roman road from Dorchester to Old Sarum.

The estate has two main entrances on Blandford Road, each with a lodge and ornate gateway. The broad drives sweep round to a carriage-turning area by the north façade of the house. The park is mainly pastureland with informal plantings of specimen trees, designed to create pleasant vistas. There are two water features to the northeast of the house.

The formal gardens and pleasure grounds are situated close to the house, with an area of informal pleasure grounds extending to the south-east. Two features are the Cedar Walk and the Lime Walk, both majestic avenues to the south of the house, as well as a plantation known as Blind Wood. There is a terrace in front of the house with urns and vases, overlooking an extensive lawned area. Other features include a Victorian fernery and a sunken garden. To the west of the house, there is a rose garden with a central circular lawn. The kitchen garden lies to the south of the pleasure grounds and is now a commercial nursery. The house and gardens are open to the public and in 2019 received about 410,000 visitors.

== Gallery ==
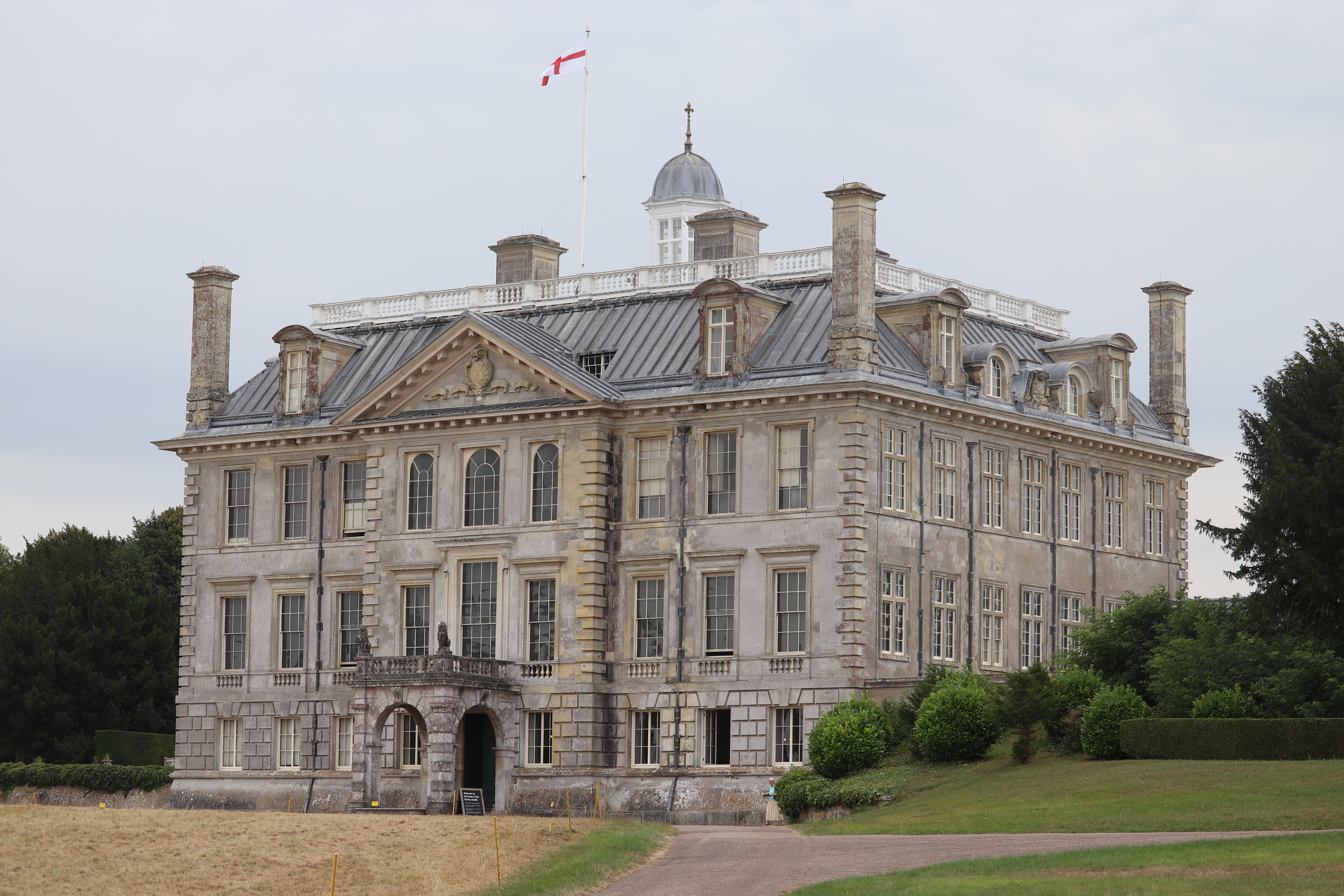
The house seen from the north west

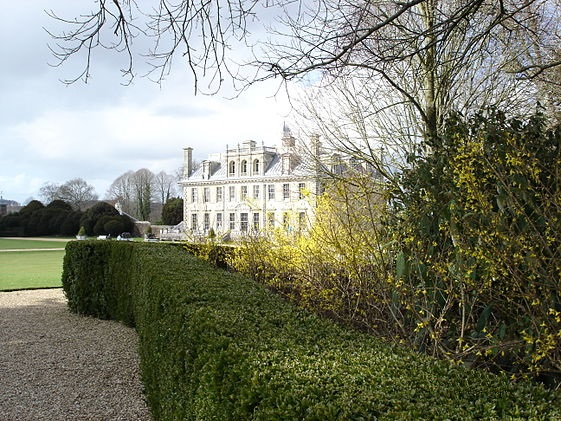
The house seen from the gardens

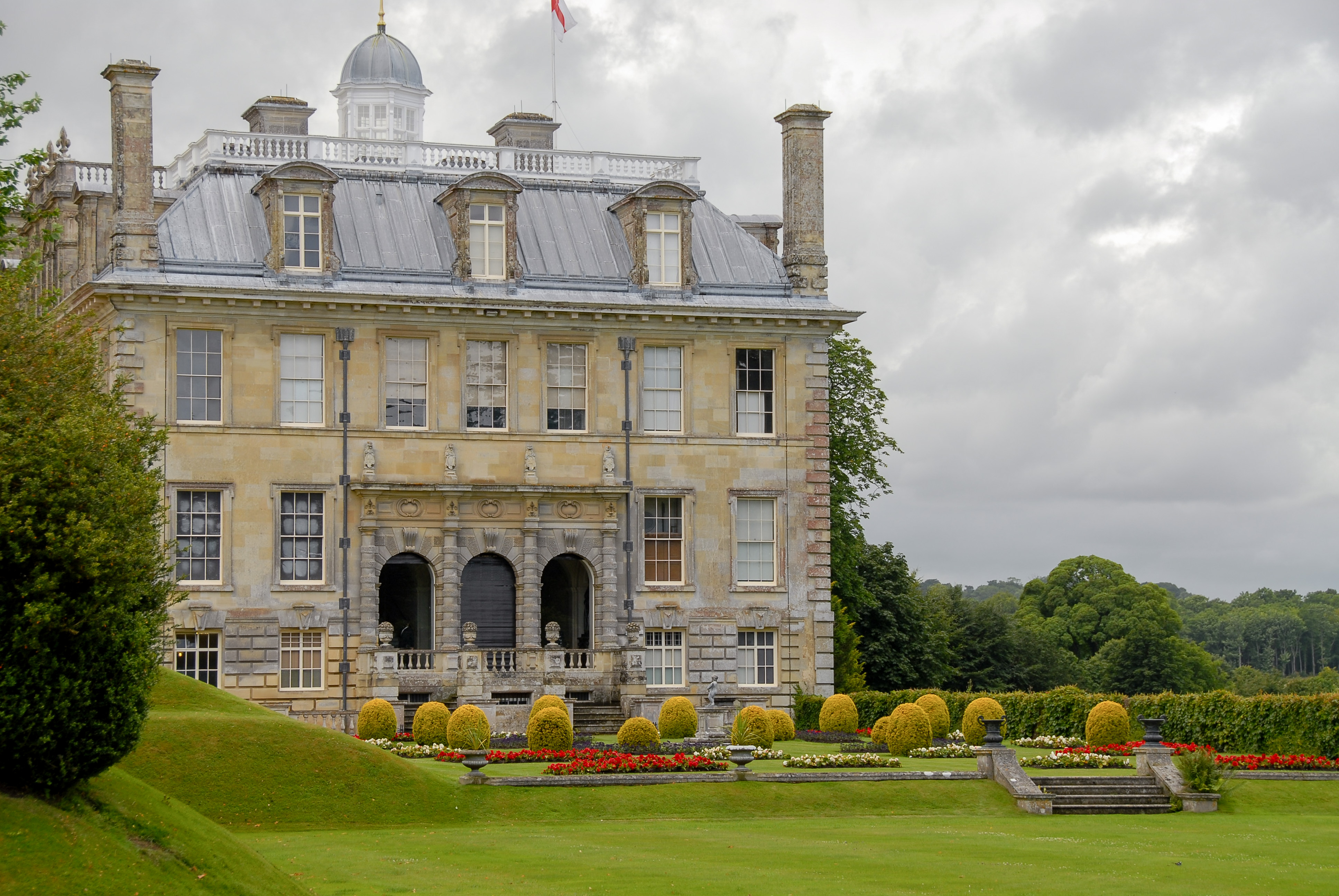
The east-facing side of the house

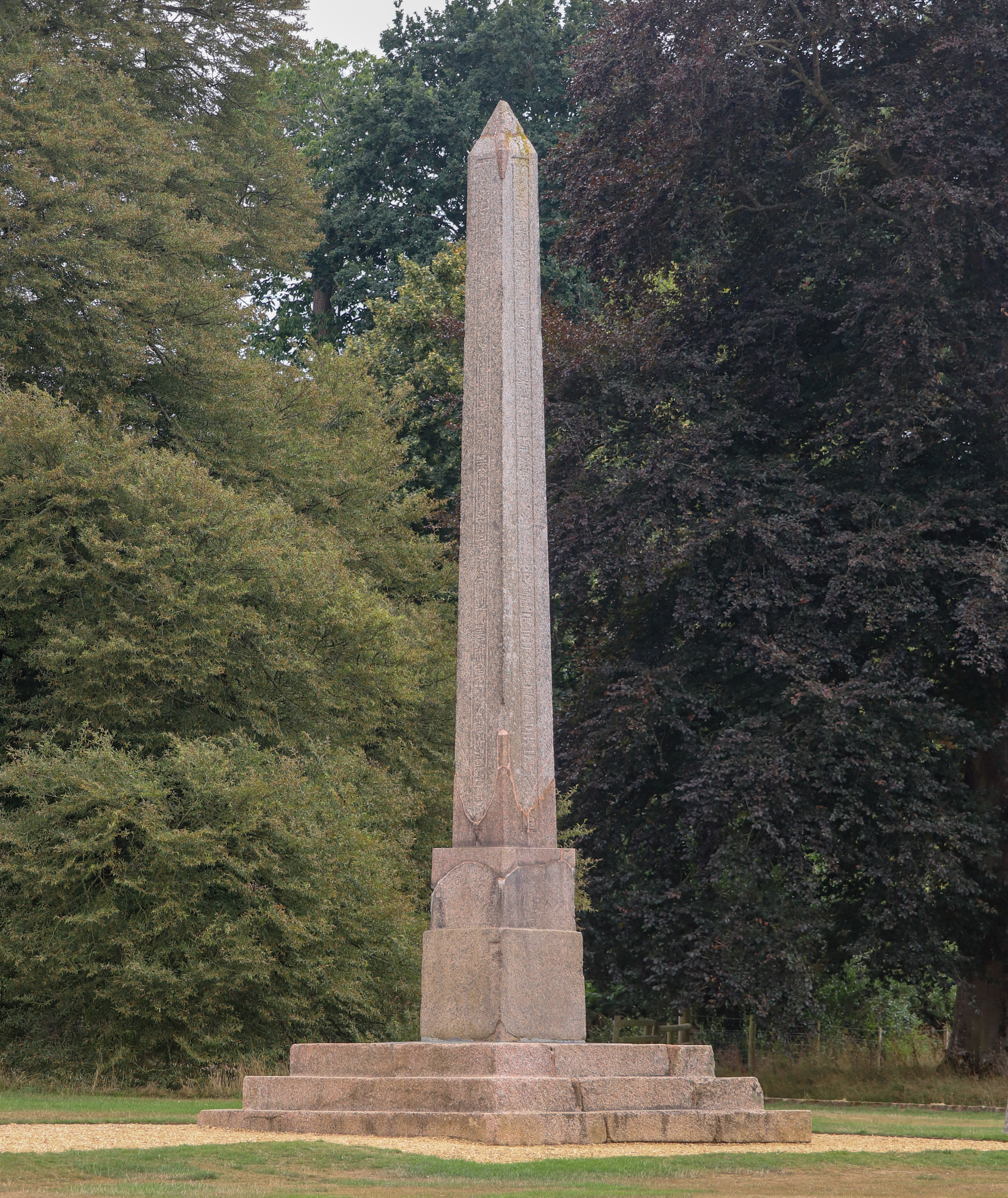
Egyptian Obelisk

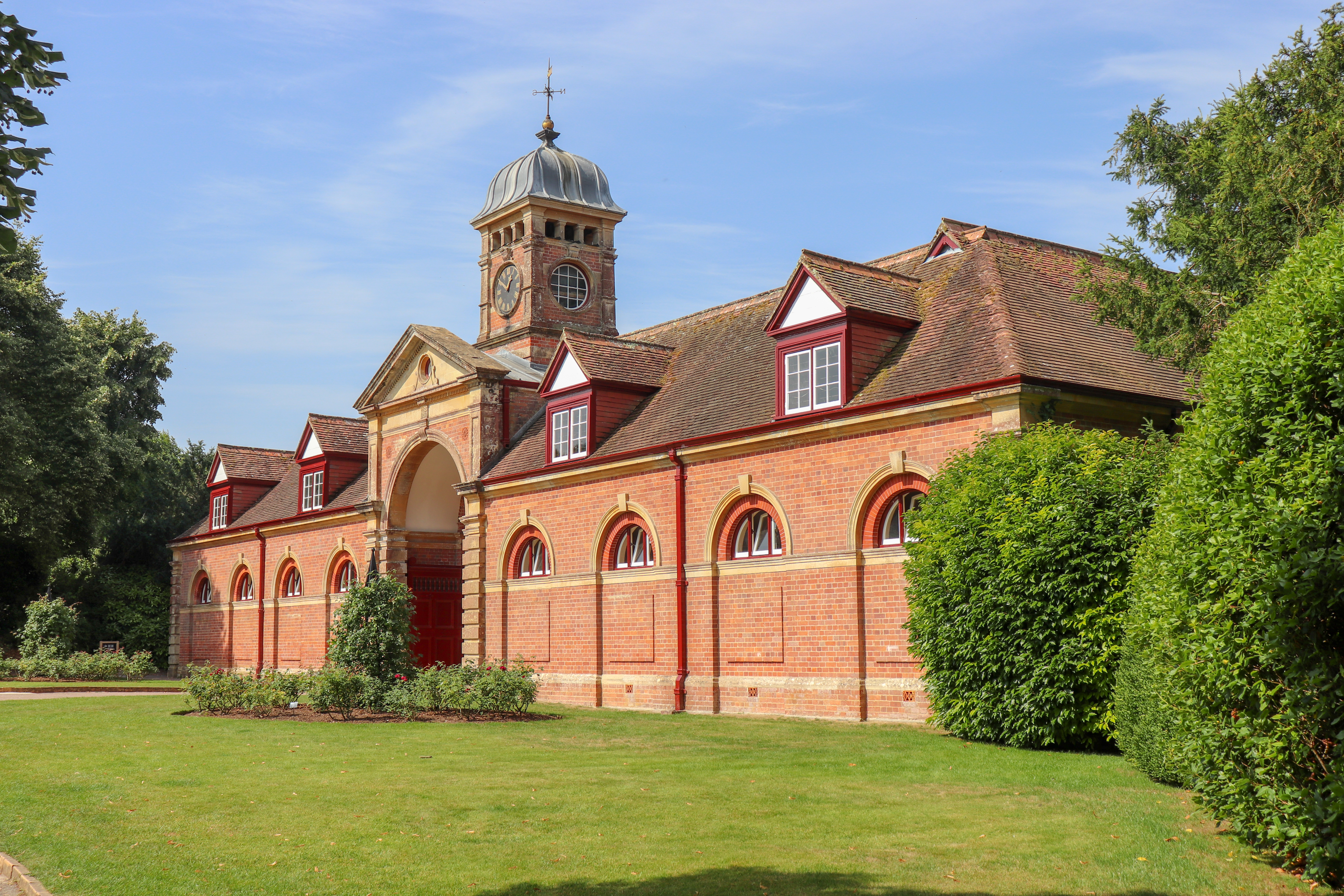
The stable block

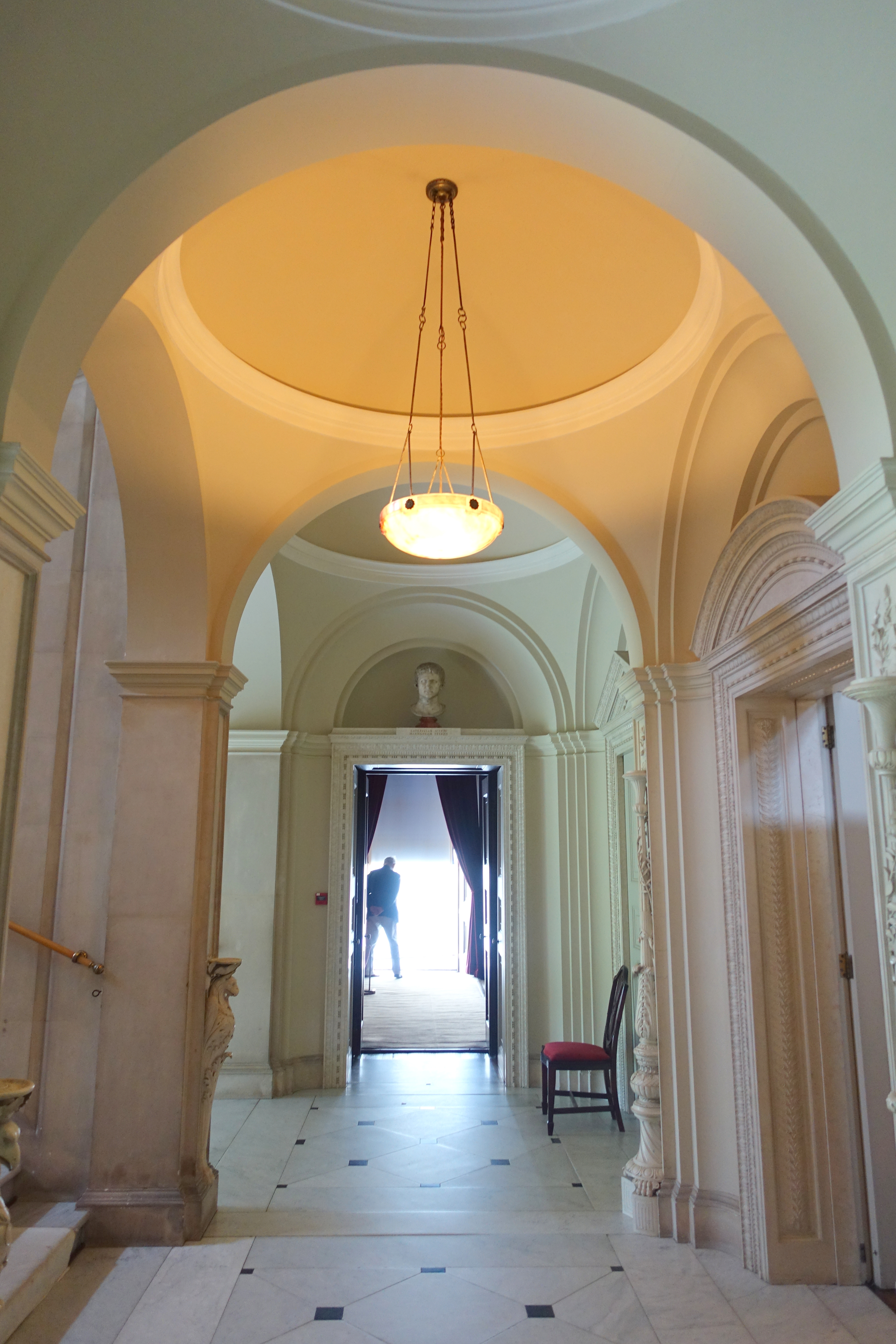
Hallway

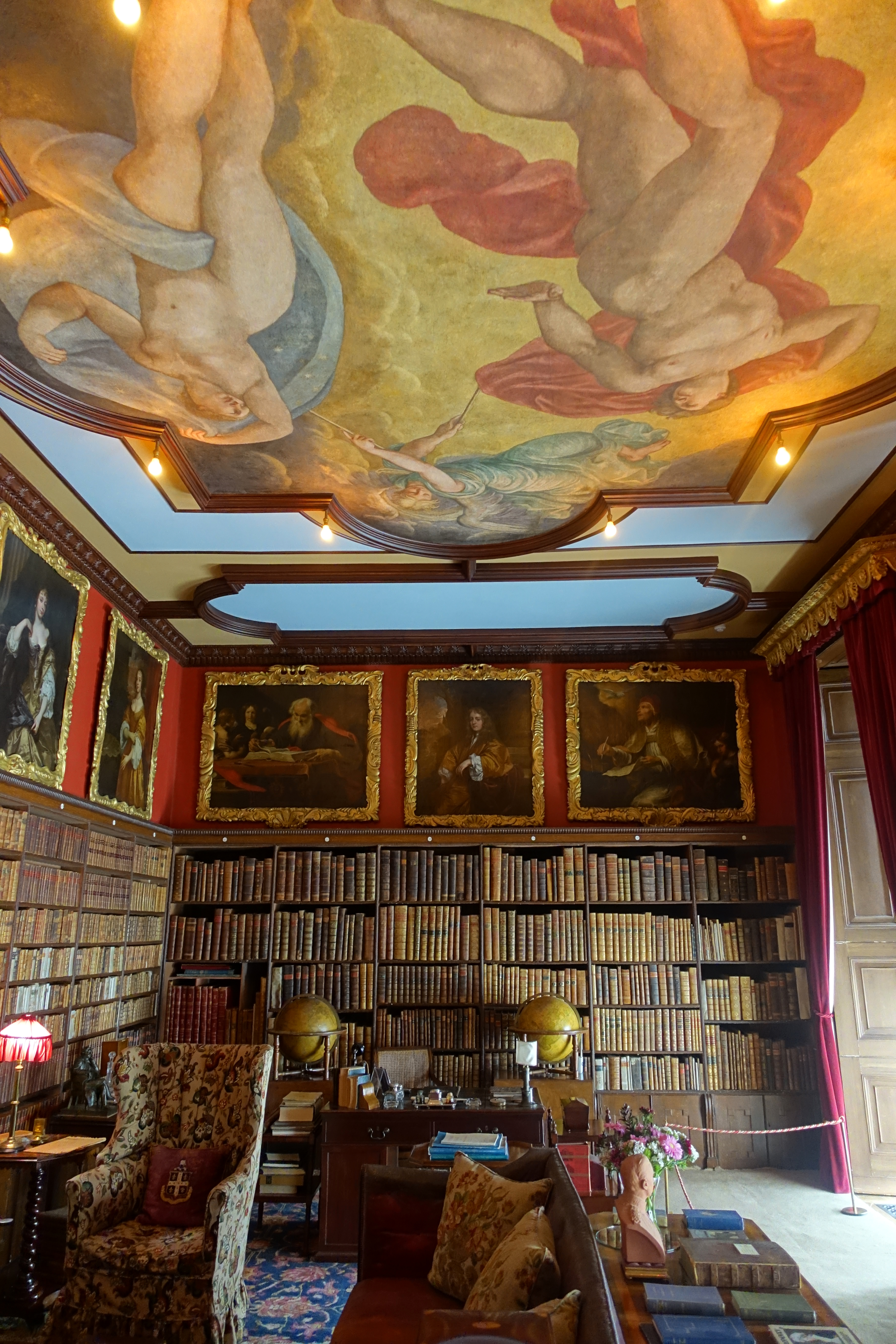
Library

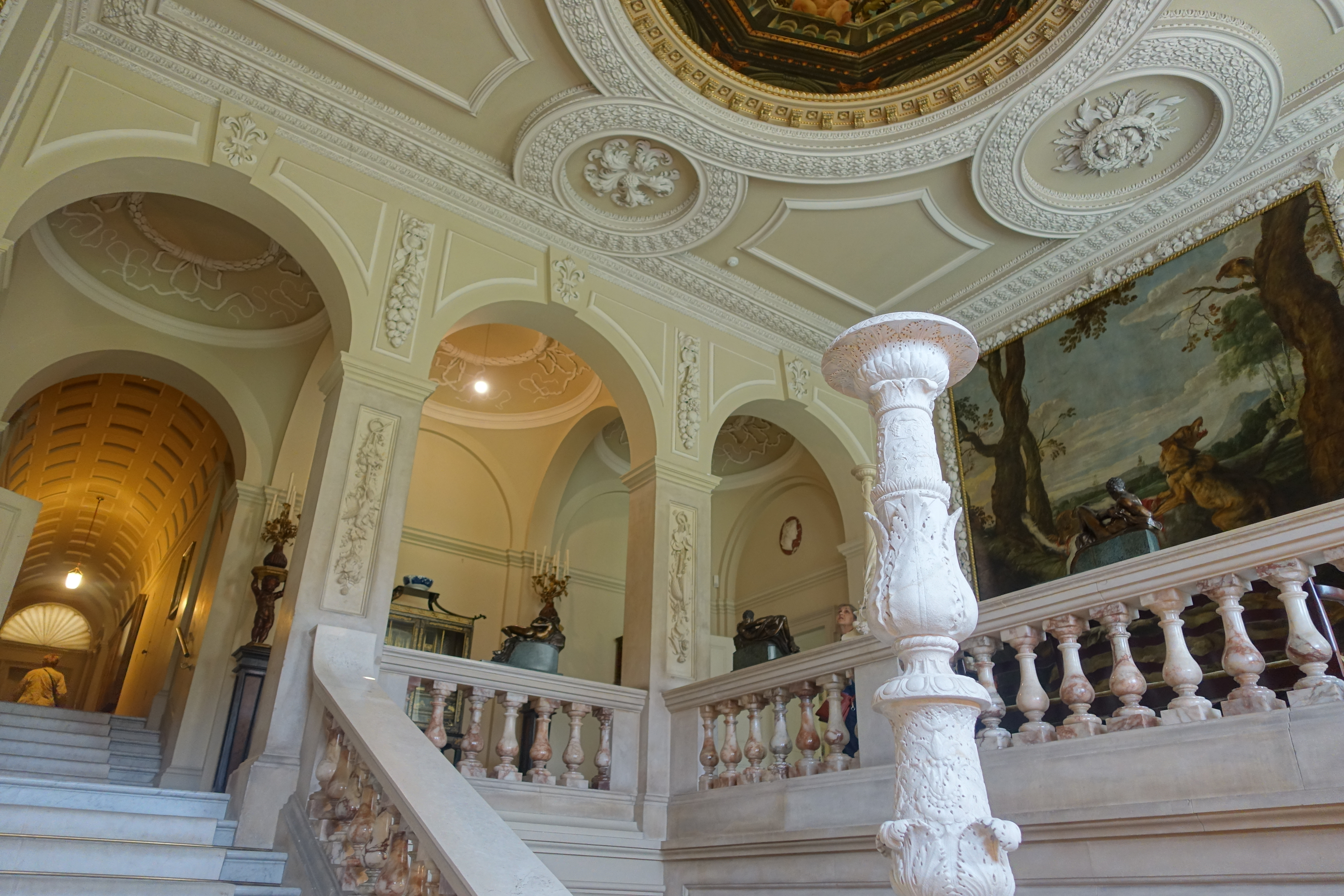
Staircase

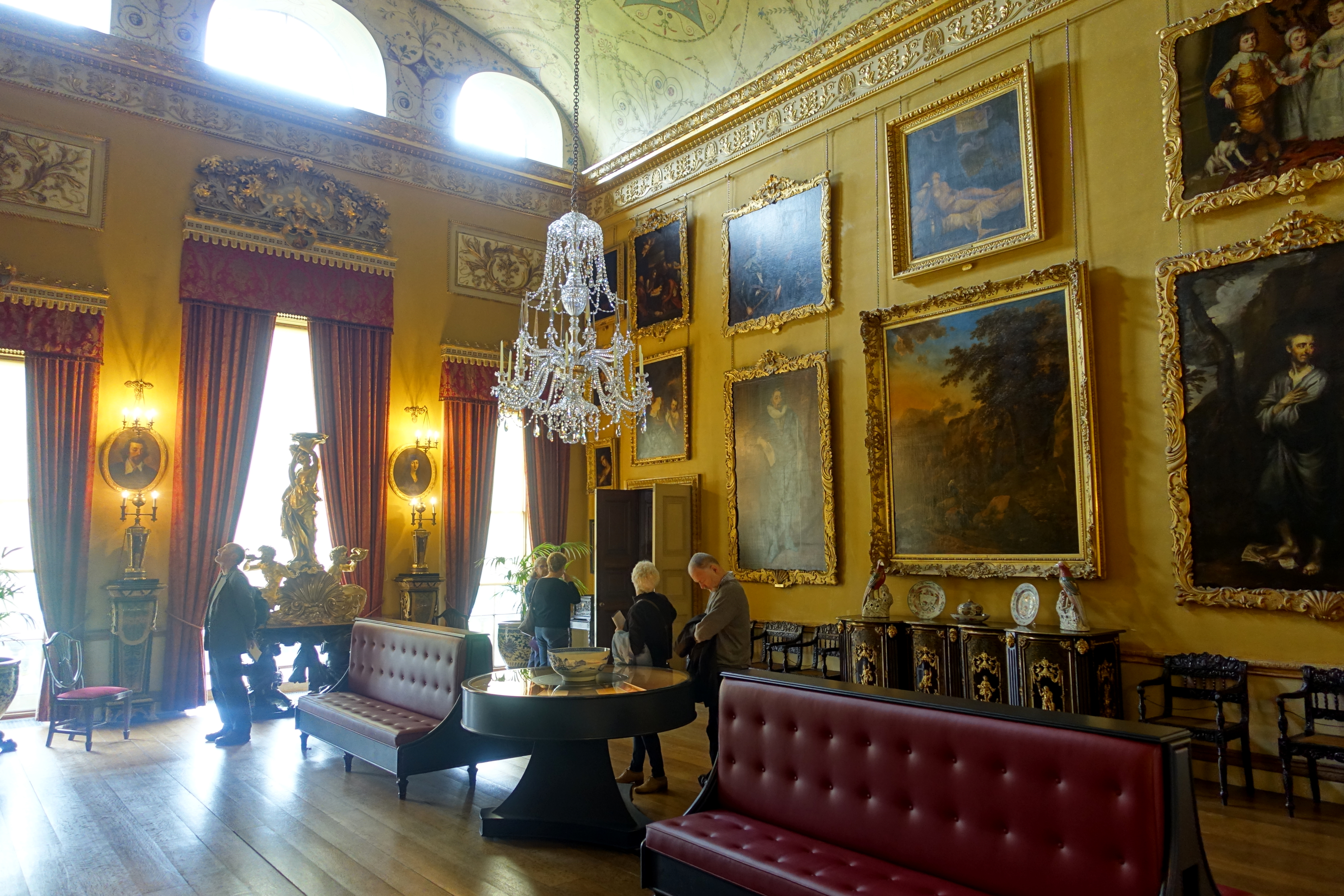
Saloon, used as ballroom.

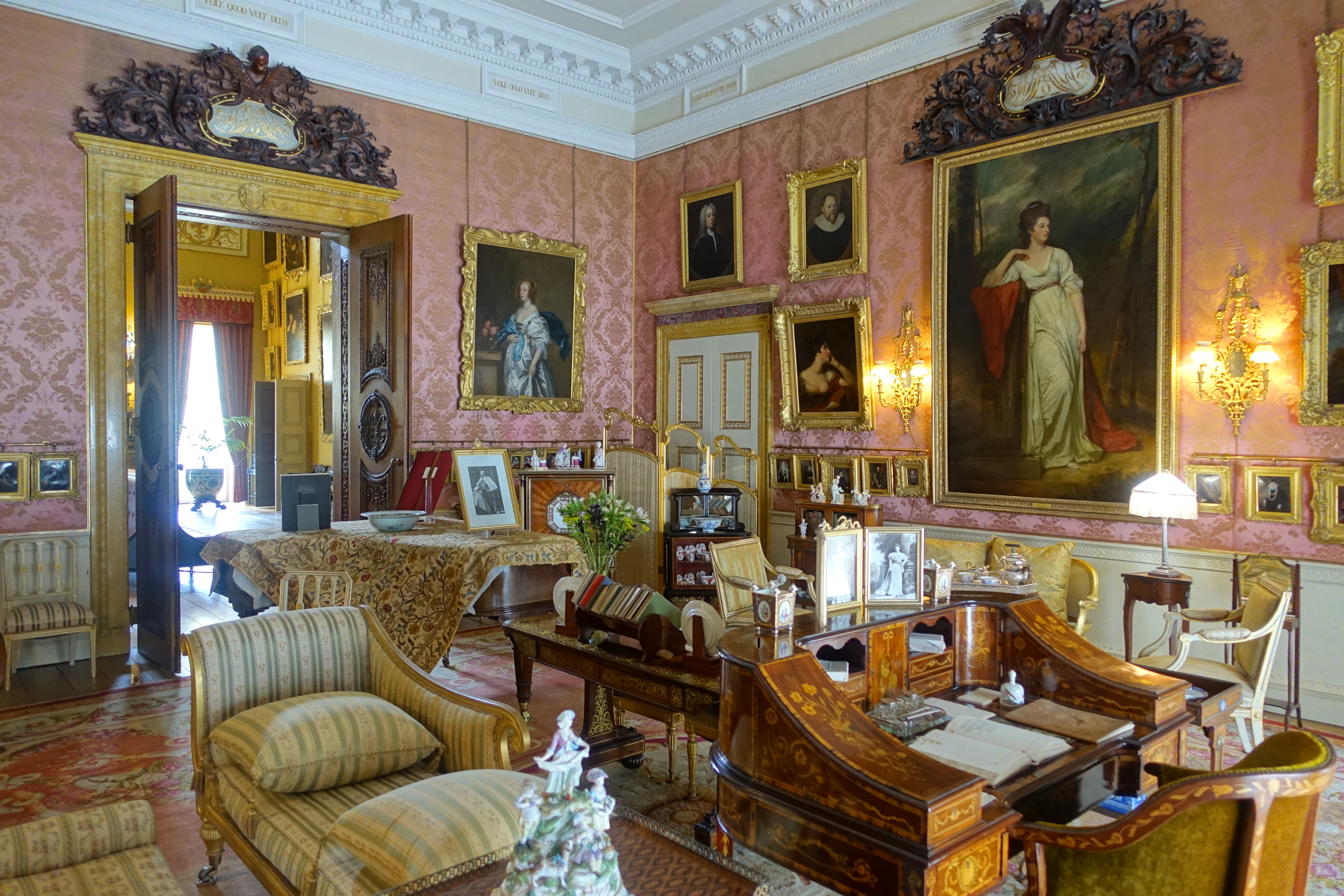
Drawing Room

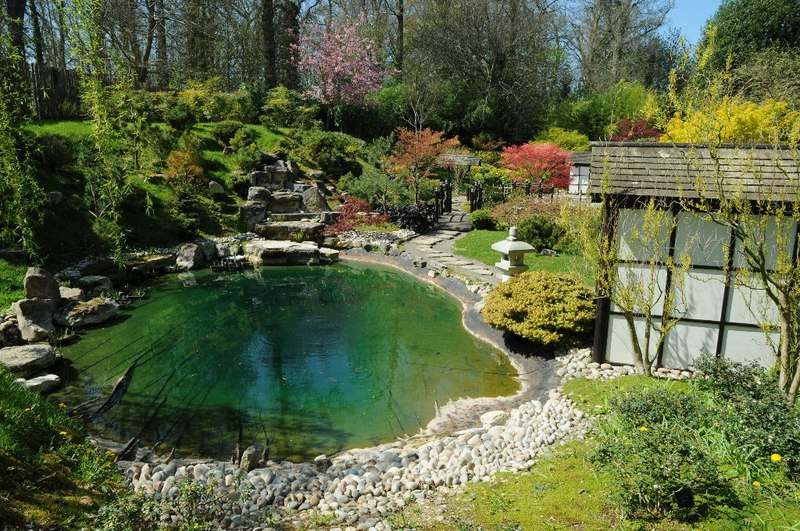
The Japanese Garden

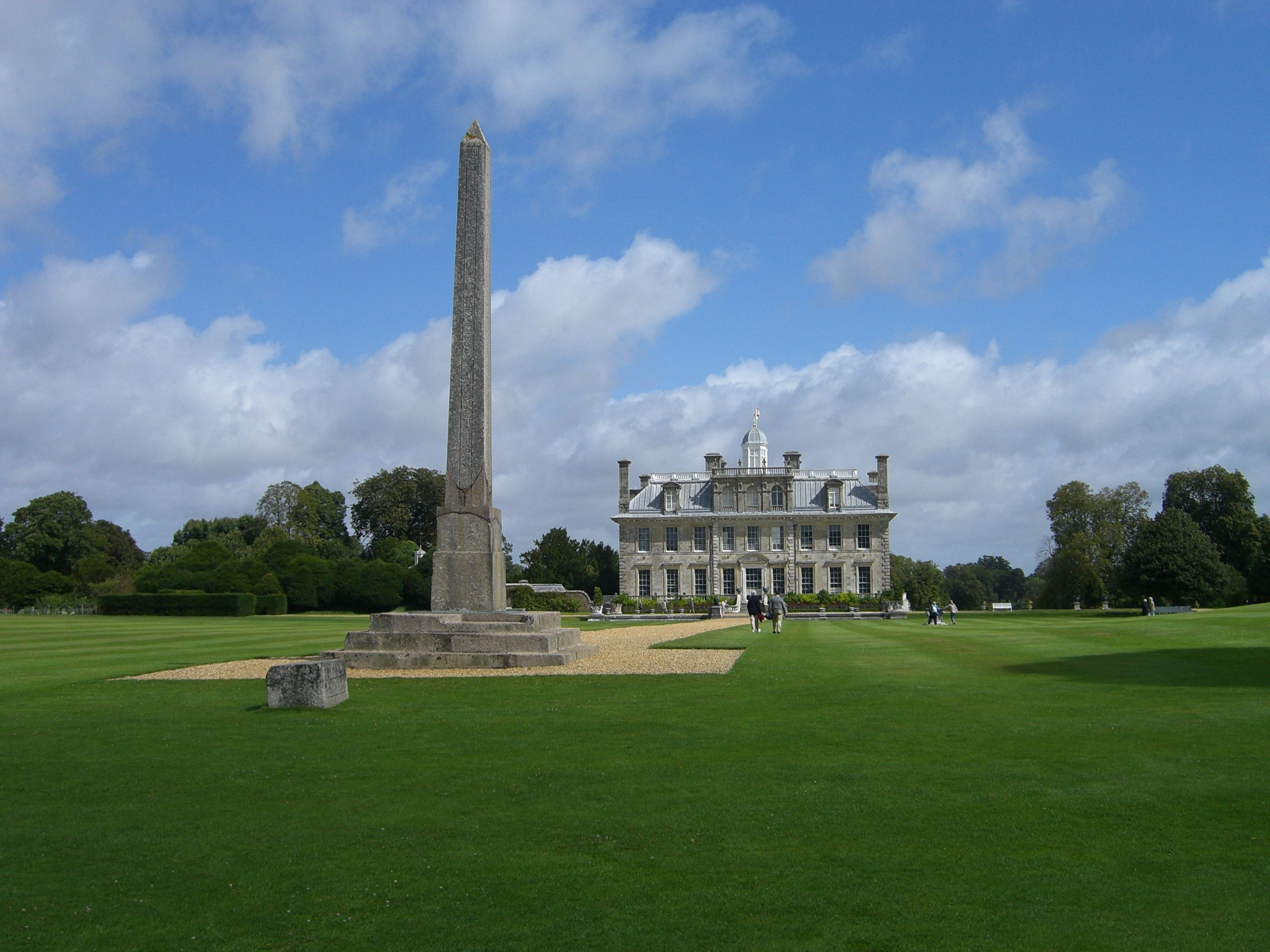
Obelisk in context
