= The Judgement of Solomon (Sebastiano del Piombo) =

Painting by Sebastiano del Piombo

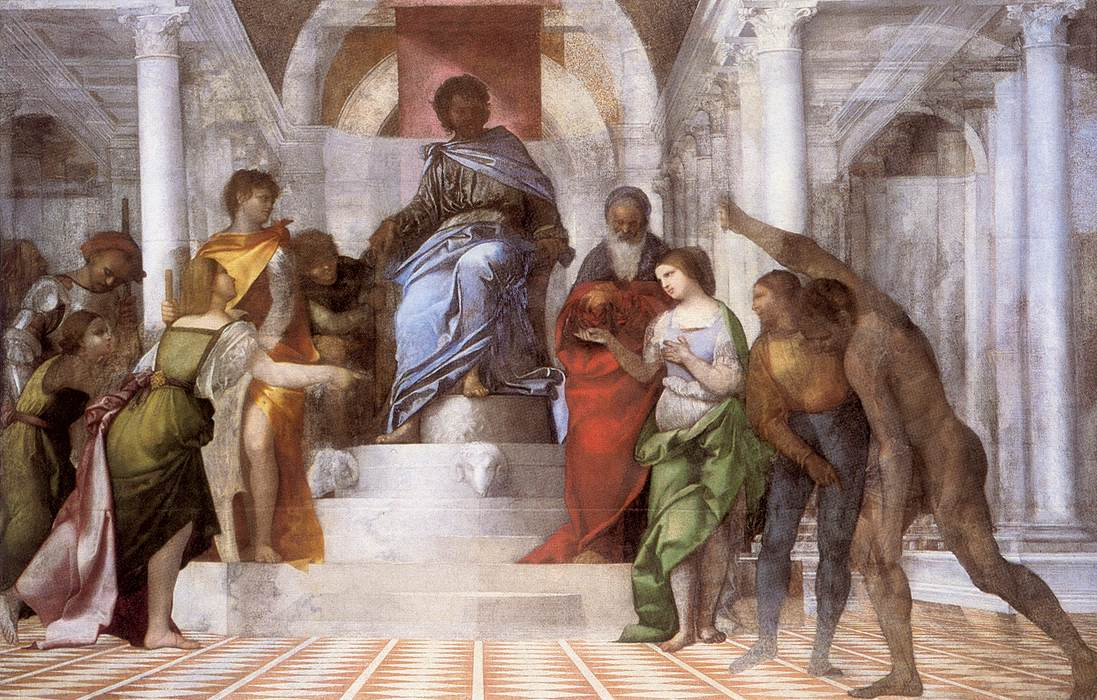
The Judgement of Solomon (c. 1505–1510) by Sebastiano del Piombo

The Judgement of Solomon is an oil on canvas painting by Sebastiano del Piombo of the Judgement of Solomon, executed c. 1505–1510, now in the Bankes collection at Kingston Lacy, a National Trust property in Dorset, England.

Incomplete, the work is usually dated to the painter's youth, when he was still working in Venice, his native city. It may have been commissioned by Andrea Loredan, a member of the Council of Ten, and may have remained incomplete when the artist was summoned to Rome. The bearded man in red quotes Giovanni Bellini's San Zaccaria Altarpiece, whilst the enthroned figure of Solomon refers to Titian's Jacopo Pesaro being presented by Pope Alexander VI to Saint Peter. The soldier on the right probably refers to the Borghese Gladiator, whilst the three women seem to be based on the same model, shown frontally, in profile and from behind.
