= Ralph Bankes (landowner) =

British landowner

Ralph Bankes JP

High Sheriff of Dorset
- In office 1938–1938
- Preceded by: Rhys Clavell Mansel
- Succeeded by: Lewys Legge Yeatman

Personal details
- Born: Henry John Ralph Bankes; 27 August 1902
- Died: 9 August 1981 (aged 78)
- Spouse: Hilary Strickland-Constable (m. 1935; died 1966)
- Relations: Bankes family
- Children: 2
- Education: Eton
- Alma mater: Magdalen College, Oxford

Henry John Ralph Bankes JP (27 August 1902 - 9 August 1981), known simply as Ralph Bankes, was a British landowner and Lord High Admiral of Purbeck.

== Early life ==
An only son, Bankes was born to Walter Ralph Bankes, a member of the Bankes family, and his wife Henriette Jenny Fraser in 1902. He was the seven-times-great-grandson of Sir John Bankes and the great-great-grandson of Henry Bankes. He was educated at Eton College in Eton, Berkshire and Magdalen College, Oxford. At Eton, Bankes befriended Robert Strickland-Constable, (later Sir Robert Frederick Strickland-Constable, 11th Bt.), the brother of his future wife, Hilary Margaret Strickland-Constable.

== Career ==
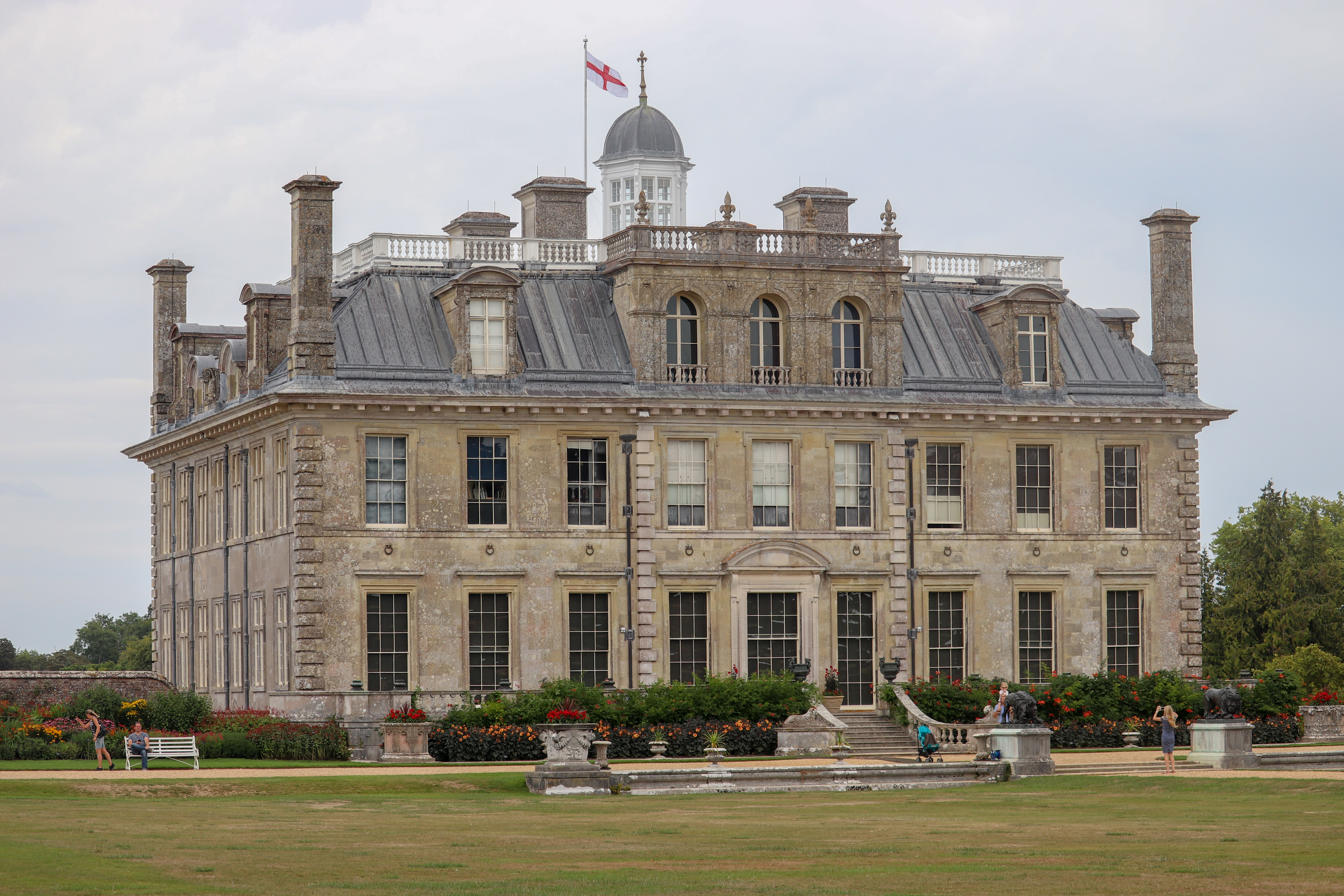
Kingston Lacy

Bankes inherited Kingston Lacy and his father's estates in 1904, while still an infant, and came into his inheritance at the age of twenty-one, when he was the largest private landowner in Dorset.

In 1936, Bankes was appointed as a Justice of the Peace for Dorset and was High Sheriff of Dorset in 1939. He was also Lord High Admiral of Purbeck, a ceremonial role.

Bankes spent his life at Kingston Lacy, “running the estate with consummate skill”. However, during his last fifteen years the great house at Kingston Lacey was neglected, and public access was brought to an end.

=== Legacy ===
Bankes was the last private owner of Corfe Castle and Kingston Lacy. On his death, he left £50,000 to each of his children and a life interest in some property to his housekeeper. He gave everything else he had, including his estates and his collections of art and antiques, to trustees for the benefit of the nation, and they donated them to the National Trust. His donation of approximately $40,000,000, is the single largest in the organisation's history.

== Personal life ==
In 1935, Bankes married Hilary Margaret (née Strickland-Constable), daughter of Lt.-Col. Frederick Charles Strickland-Constable and Margaret Elizabeth Pakenham. Hilary Margaret, the sister of Sir Henry Strickland-Constable, 10th Baronet, was the great-granddaughter of Thomas Pakenham, 2nd Earl of Longford and Sir George Strickland, 7th Baronet. Together, Ralph and Hilary were the parents of two children:

- John Ralph Bankes (1937–1996), who was educated at Eton and University College, Oxford; an officer in the Coldstream Guards and amateur magician, he died unmarried.
- Mary Bankes (b. 1940).

His wife died on 11 September 1966. Bankes died on 9 August 1981.
