= Chicksgrove Quarry =

Site of Special Scientific Interest in Wiltshire, England

Coordinates: 51.0657°N 2.0556°W

Chicksgrove Quarry (grid reference ST962296) is a 14 acres (5.7 ha) geological Site of Special Scientific Interest south of Upper Chicksgrove in Wiltshire, England notified in 1971.

Chilmark stone, a form of limestone, is quarried at the site.

Chicksgrove Quarry Ltd also operates Chilmark Mine, a site 1.5 miles to the northeast at Chilmark Quarries.

== Chilmark stone ==
Chilmark stone is a fine quality building stone used extensively for construction and restoration projects throughout the South of England and nationally as a match for other stones such as Reigate Stone, Malmstone and Kentish rag. Thousands of tonnes of stone from Chicksgrove Quarry have been used in the restoration of Salisbury Cathedral. Other uses for the stone include restoration at Westminster Abbey Chapter House and Hampton Court Palace.

== Geological interest ==
Strata at the quarry were first studied by Etheldred Benett in 1819. The geology exposed by the present and historical workings at Chicksgrove Quarry contribute heavily towards its classification as an SSSI, and access to the former quarry faces for future generations features in the quarry's restoration plans.

The Chilmark stone at Chicksgrove Quarry dates from the latter part of the Jurassic period, around 145 million years ago. The stone is from the upper part of the Portland stone Formation and the lowest beds of the Purbeck Limestone Group.
