= Mary Bankes =

English Royalist (c. 1598–1661)

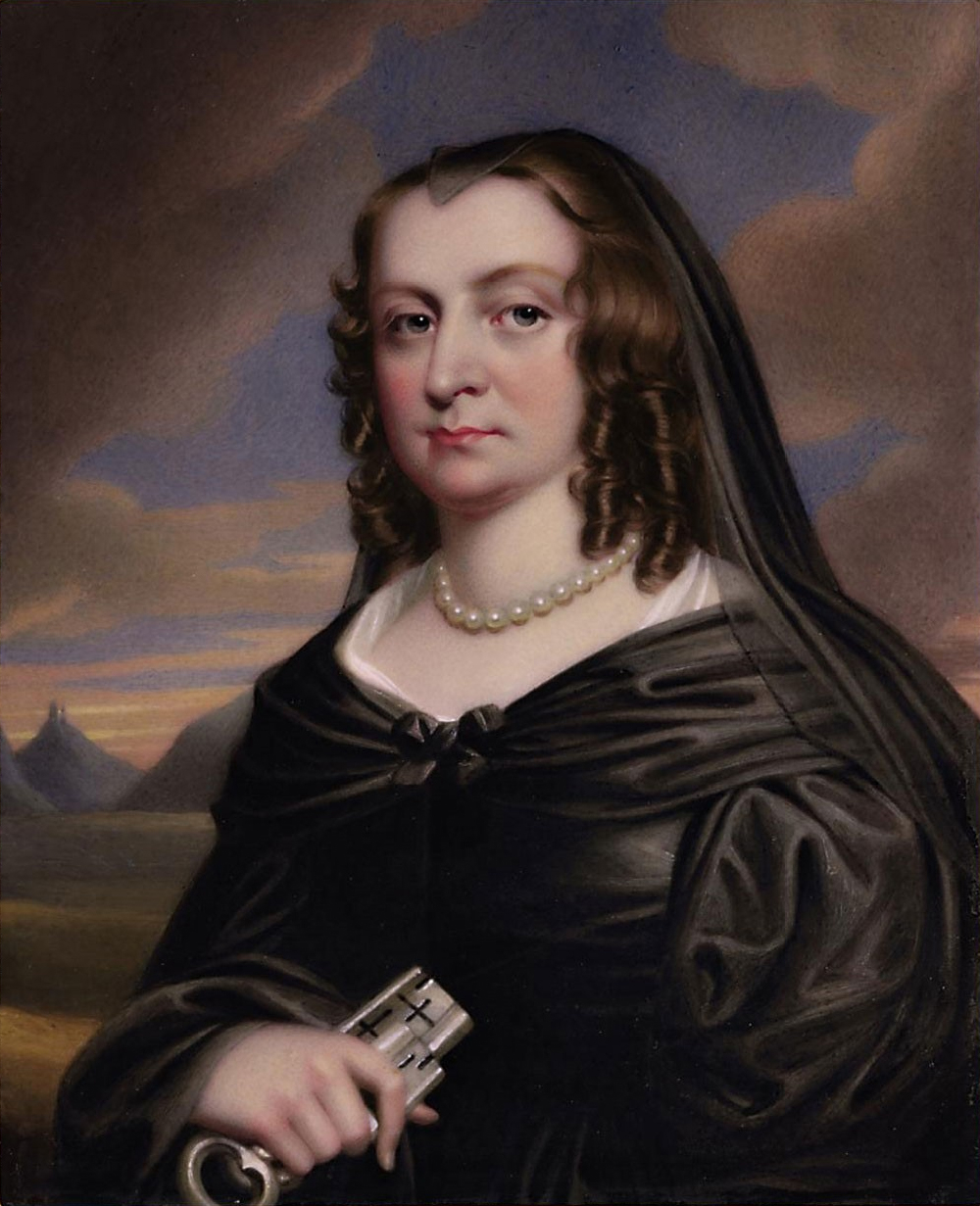
- Born: Mary Hawtry c. 1598; Ruislip, Middlesex, England
- Died: 11 April 1661
- Known for: Her defence of Corfe Castle against a three-year Parliamentarian siege during the English Civil War
- Spouse: Sir John Bankes
- Children: Sir Ralph Bankes; Jerome Bankes; Charles Bankes; William Bankes; Alice Bankes; Jane Bankes; Mary Bankes; Joanna Bankes; Elizabeth Bankes; Arabella Bankes; Dorothy Bankes

Mary, Lady Bankes (née Hawtry; c. 1598 – 11 April 1661) was a Royalist who defended Corfe Castle from a three-year siege during the English Civil War from 1643 to 1645. She was married to Sir John Bankes, Lord Chief Justice of the Common Pleas and Attorney-General of King Charles I.

== Marriage and children ==
Mary Hawtry was born in about 1598, the only daughter of Ralph Hawtry, Esquire of Ruislip, Middlesex, and Mary Altham. In about 1618, she married Sir John Bankes, who later became Attorney-General to King Charles I and Lord Chief Justice of the Common Pleas. In 1635, Sir John purchased Corfe Castle in Dorset with all its manors, rights, and privileges from Lady Elizabeth Coke. Sir John died on 28 December 1644 at the age of 55.

Together Sir John and Mary had four sons and seven daughters:

- Sir Ralph Bankes (1631–1677), married Mary Bruen, by whom he had two children.
- Jerome Bankes
- Charles Bankes
- William Bankes
- Alice Bankes, married Sir John Borlase, 1st Baronet, by whom she had issue
- Jane Bankes, married George Cullen
- Anne Bankes, married Sir George Curteis of Otterden Place
- Mary Bankes, married Sir Robert Jenkinson, by whom she had issue.
- Joanna Bankes, married William Borlase of Great Marlow, Buckinghamshire, younger brother of her sister Alice's husband, by whom she had issue.
- Elizabeth Bankes
- Arabella Bankes, married Samuel Gilly
- Dorothy Bankes, married Nicholas Makareth

== Siege ==
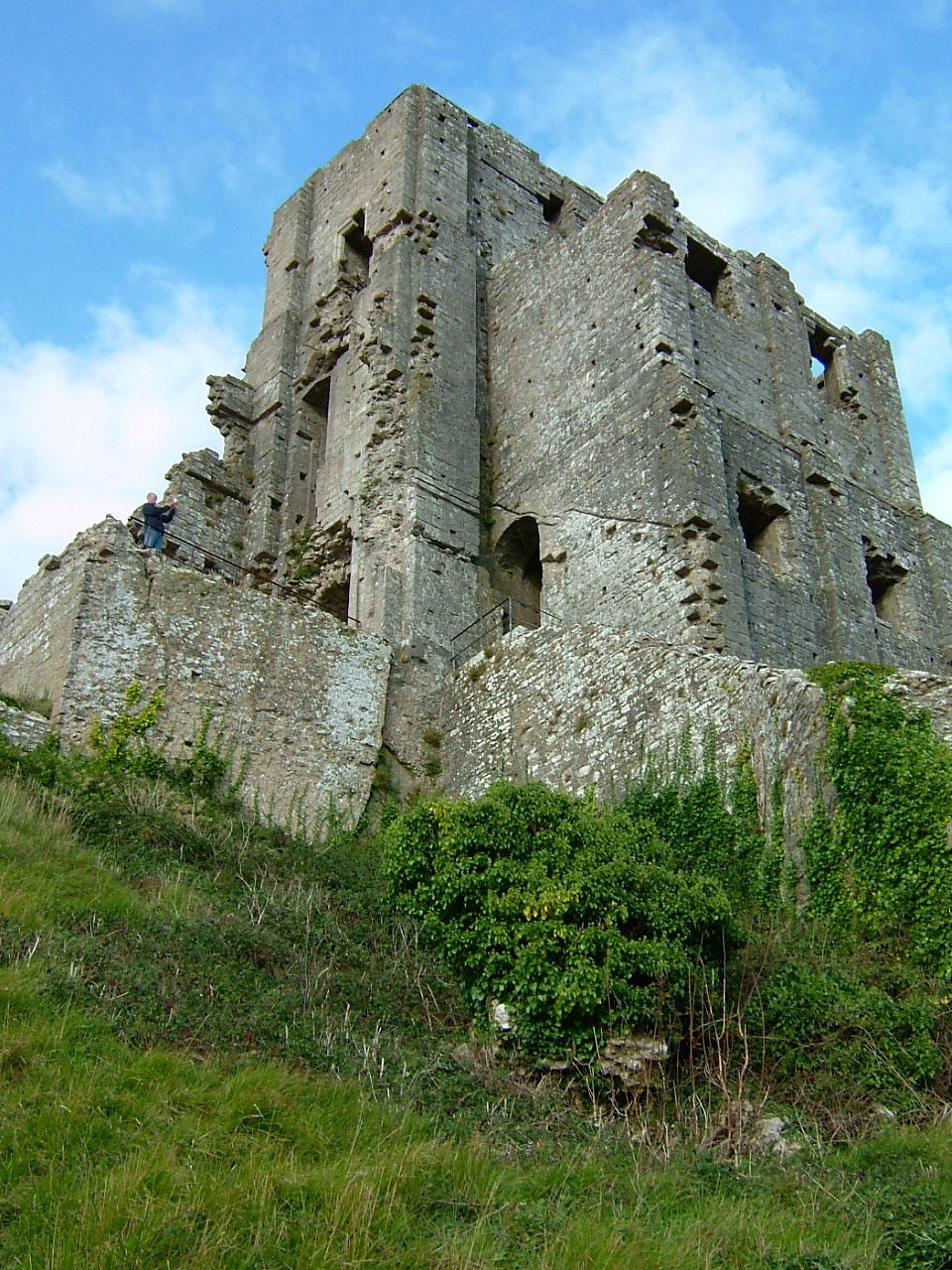
Corfe Castle, which Lady Bankes defended against attacking Parliamentarians

In 1643, when civil war broke out in England, she assumed control of Corfe Castle when John Bankes had been ordered by the king to serve in combat in London and Oxford. She remained behind with her children, servants, and a force of five men. By that point, Corfe Castle was the last Royalist garrison on the Dorsetshire coast. In May 1643, a force of Parliamentarians, consisting of forty seamen, demanded the surrender of the castle's four pieces of ordnance. She, her maidservants, and her small group of soldiers retaliated with cannon fire and drove them away. Later, she gave up the ordnance in order to have some time to resupply the castle.

On 28 June, 500-600 parliamentary troops began their first siege of Corfe. Mary and her small group defended the Upper Ward and by heaving stones and hot embers from the battlements, managed to repel the assailants, killing and wounding over 100 men in August. In 1646, one of her officers, Colonel Pitman, betrayed her by leading a party of Parliamentarians into the castle via a sally gate. The Parliamentarians under the command of a Colonel Bingham reversed their jackets and were mistaken for Royalists. As a result, she was forced to surrender the castle. However, because she showed such courage she was allowed to keep the keys of the castle, which are now held at Kingston Lacy near Wimborne Minster, Dorset. The castle was slighted the same year it was captured by the orders of the House of Commons.

It is recorded that her sons Ralph and Jerome bought the manor of Eastcourt on her behalf. Upon her death, the manor passed to her daughter Joanna Borlase, who in her turn passed it on to her daughters and co-heirs.

== Death ==
Mary died on 11 April 1661 and was buried in St Martin's Church, Ruislip. On the south wall of the chancel inside the church there is a monument to Mary with this inscription:

To the memory of Mary, Lady Bankes, the only daughter of Ralph Hawtery, of Riselip, in the county of Middlesex, esq., the wife and widow of Sir John Bankes, knight, late Lord Chief Justice of His Majesty's court of Common Pleas, and of the Privy Council of His Majesty King Charles I of blessed memory, who having had the honour to have borne with a constancy and courage above her sex, a noble proportion of the late calamities, and the restitution of the government, with great peace of mind laid down her most desired life the 11th day of April 1661. Sir Ralph Bankes her son and heir hath dedicated this.

Lady Bankes Primary School is named after her in Ruislip Manor.
