= 1660s in architecture =

== Buildings and structures ==
=== Buildings ===
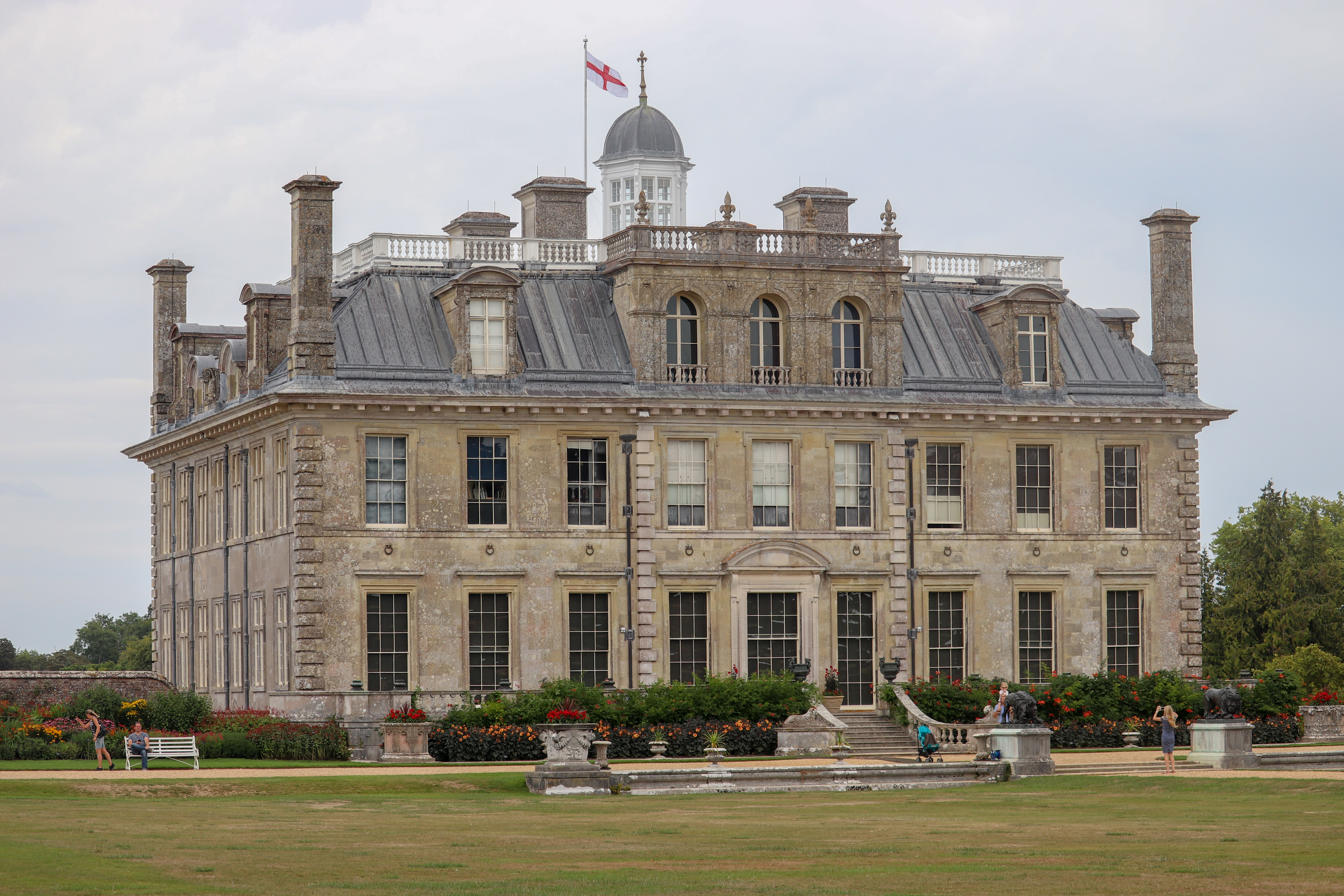
Kingston Lacy in Dorset, England

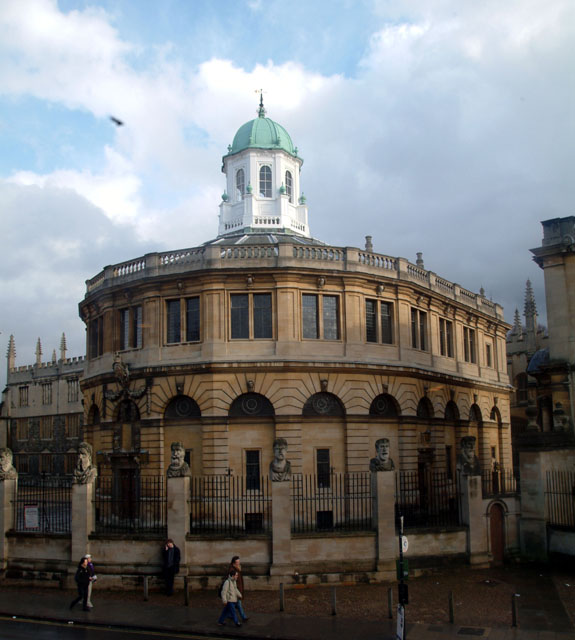
Sheldonian Theatre, Oxford

- 1660
  - Moti Masjid (Pearl Mosque) in the Red Fort of Delhi completed.
  - Teele Wali Masjid, Lucknow in the regin of Mughal Emperor Aurangzeb, Built in the supervision of Fidai Khan Koka, completed.
  - Tilya-Kori Madrasah in the Registan of Samarkand completed (begun in 1646).
- 1661
  - Château de Vaux-le-Vicomte, designed by Louis Le Vau, completed.
  - Work begun on Versailles, near Paris.
- 1662
  - King Charles Court of the Greenwich Hospital in London, designed by John Webb.
  - Pažaislis Monastery founded (completed in 1755).
  - Coleshill House in the Vale of White Horse, England, designed by Roger Pratt, completed (begun in 1649).
  - Groombridge Place in Kent, England, built by Philip Packer for himself.
- 1663
  - Galerie d'Apollon at the Louvre Palace, designed by Louis Le Vau, completed.
  - arsenal of Civitavecchia, designed by Gianlorenzo Bernini, completed (begun in 1660).
- 1664
  - Eltham Lodge near London, designed by Hugh May, completed.
- 1665
  - Sant'Andrea al Quirinale in Rome, designed by Bernini, completed.
  - Designs for Louvre Palace façade by Bernini (unbuilt).
  - Kingston Lacy in Dorset, designed by Roger Pratt, completed (begun in 1663).
  - Horseheath Hall in Cambridgeshire, designed by Roger Pratt, completed (begun in 1663).
  - Petersberg Citadel, Erfurt, Germany foundation stone laid (June 1).
  - New chapel at Pembroke College, Cambridge, England, Christopher Wren's first completed work of architecture, dedicated (September 21).
  - Chapel of Brasenose College, Oxford consecrated.
- 1666
  - Scala Regia in the Vatican, designed by Bernini, completed.
  - Plans for rebuilding London by various leading citizens, including Christopher Wren, Robert Hooke, and John Evelyn.
- 1667
  - Saint Peter's Square in the Vatican City, designed by Bernini, completed.
  - Louvre Palace façade, designed by Claude Perrault, begun (completed in 1674).
  - Church of the Val-de-Grâce, designed by François Mansart and Jacques Lemercier, completed (begun in 1645).
  - Clarendon House in London, designed by Roger Pratt, completed (begun in 1664).
  - Santa Maria in Campitelli in Rome, designed by Carlo Rainaldi, completed.
  - Opernhaus am Taschenberg in Dresden, designed by Wolf Caspar von Klengel, opened (January 27).
- 1668
  - San Lorenzo in Turin, designed by Guarino Guarini, begun (completed in 1687).
- 1669
  - Sheldonian Theatre in Oxford, England, designed by Christopher Wren for University ceremonial, inaugurated (July 9).
  - Second Royal Exchange, London, designed by Edward Jarman, opened (September 28).
  - Alamgir Mosque, Varanasi, built.

== Events ==
- 1661 – English astronomer Christopher Wren advises on repairs to Old St Paul's Cathedral in London and declines appointment to direct new fortifications at Tangier, his earliest known direct involvement with practical architecture.
- 1665-66: Christopher Wren traveled to Paris; met Bernini
- 1666: September 2–5 – The Great Fire of London destroys most of the city including Old St Paul's Cathedral.
- 1667: August 18 – In an effort to prevent narrow streets from being blocked from all light by tall buildings, the city of Paris enacts its first building code limiting the height of new construction. Buildings may be no taller than eight toise — 15.6 metres (51 ft) — tall. In 1783, rules are implemented to consider the width of the street.
- 1668 – Roger Pratt becomes the first person knighted for services to architecture.
- 1668: June – William Talman appointed Comptroller of the King's Works in England.
- 1669: March 19 – Christopher Wren appointed Surveyor of the King's Works in England.

== Births ==
- 1660 – Jakob Prandtauer, Austrian Baroque architect (died 1726)
- 1661 – Daniel Marot, French architect (died 1752)
- 1661: May 7 – George Clarke, English politician, scholar and amateur architect (died 1736)
- 1661 (probable date) – Nicholas Hawksmoor, English architect (died 1736)
- 1664: January 24 – John Vanbrugh, English dramatist and architect (died 1726)
- 1666: March 15 – George Bähr, German architect, designer of Protestant churches (died 1738)
- 1668 – Johann Lukas von Hildebrandt, Austrian Baroque architect (died 1745)
- c. 1668 – Thomas Archer, English architect (died 1743)

== Deaths ==
- 1666
  - January 28 – Tommaso Dingli, Maltese architect (born 1591)
  - September 23 – François Mansart, French architect (born 1598)
- 1667: August 3 – Francesco Borromini, Italian Baroque architect (born 1599)
- 1669: May 16 – Pietro da Cortona, Italian Baroque architect (born 1596)
