= List of historic buildings of the United Kingdom =

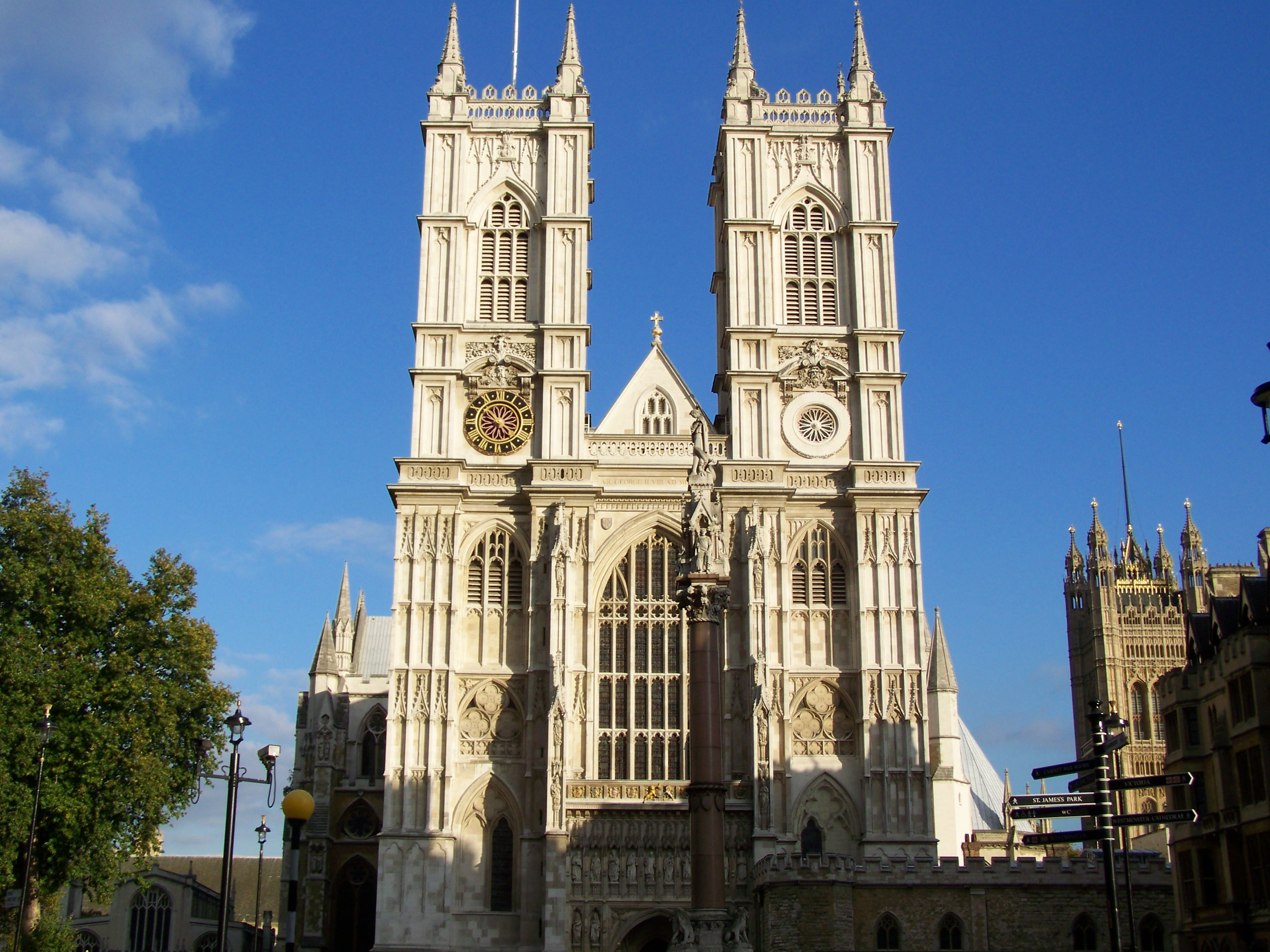
Westminster Abbey, founded 1065, completed c. 1090

The historic buildings of the United Kingdom date from prehistoric times onwards. The earliest are Neolithic buildings and these are followed by those of ancient, medieval and modern times, all exemplifying the architecture of the United Kingdom. Below is a list of important buildings and structures from the beginning until Georgian times (18th and early 19th centuries).

== Anglo-Saxon, Celtic and Viking buildings and structures ==
Approximately 5th century to the Norman Conquest of 1066.

A - L
- Abernethy Round Tower, Perth and Kinross
- Anglian Tower, York
- St John the Baptist's Church, Barnack, Peterborough
- St Peter's Church, Barton-upon-Humber, Lincolnshire
- Holy Trinity Church, Bosham, West Sussex
- St Laurence's Church, Bradford-on-Avon, Wiltshire
- St Peter-on-the-Wall, Bradwell-on-Sea, Essex
- St Mary's Church, Breamore, Hampshire
- Brechin Round Tower, Angus
- Brigstock Church, Northamptonshire
- All Saints' Church, Brixworth
- Cadbury Castle hill fort, Somerset
- St Martin's Church, Canterbury
- Cheddar Palace, Somerset
- Daw's Castle hill fort, Somerset
- St Mary's Church, Deerhurst, Gloucestershire
- Devil's Dyke, Cambridgeshire, earthwork
- St Mary de Castro, Dover, Kent
- Dùn Èistean, Lewis, Scotland
- All Saints' Church, Earls Barton
- Escomb Church, County Durham
- Glastonbury Abbey, Somerset
- Great Paxton Church, Cambridgeshire
- Greensted Church, Essex
- St Botolph's Church, Hadstock, Essex
- Hexham Abbey crypt, Northumberland
- St Peter's Church, Heysham, Lancashire
- Iona Abbey, Argyll and Bute
- Jórvík (Viking York)
- King Doniert's Stone, Cornwall
- Lindisfarne, or Holy Island, Northumberland
M - Z
- Monkwearmouth-Jarrow Abbey, County Durham
- St Mary Coslany, Norwich
- Odda's Chapel, Deerhurst, Gloucestershire
- Offa's Dyke, earthwork separating the former kingdoms of Mercia and Powys
- Old Minster, Winchester, Hampshire
- St Michael at the Northgate, Oxford
- St Andrew's Church, Presteigne, Powys
- Ripon Cathedral crypt, North Yorkshire
- Roman Ridge, earthwork in South Yorkshire
- St Mary's Church, Reculver, Kent
- St Mary's Church, Sompting, West Sussex
- Stow Minster, Lincolnshire
- St Wystan's Church, Repton, Derbyshire
- St Augustine's Abbey, Canterbury, Kent
- Sherborne Abbey, Dorset
- Sutton Hoo burial complex, Suffolk
- Tintagel, Cornwall
- Wansdyke (earthwork), south-west England
- West Stow, Suffolk
- All Saints' Church, Wing, Buckinghamshire
- Wittering Church, Cambridgeshire
- St. Nicholas' Church, Worth, West Sussex
- Yeavering, Northumberland

== Norman architecture ==
11th and 12th centuries.

A - L
- All Saints' Church East Meon
- Appleby Castle
- Arundel Castle
- Bamburgh Castle
- Barfrestone church
- Berkeley Castle
- Berkhamsted Castle
- Boxgrove Priory
- Brough Castle
- Bury St. Edmunds Abbey
- Carlisle Castle
- Carrickfergus Castle
- Castle Acre Castle
- Castle Acre Priory
- Castle Rising (castle)
- Chepstow Castle
- Christ Church Cathedral, Oxford
- Christchurch Priory
- Colchester Castle
- Corfe Castle
- Dalmeny Church
- Dover Castle
- Dunfermline Abbey
- Durham Castle
- Durham Cathedral
- Ely Cathedral
- Ewenny Priory
- Framlingham Castle
- Hedingham Castle
- Helmsley Castle
- The Holy Sepulchre, Cambridge
- Hospital of St Cross, Winchester
- Jedburgh Abbey
- Jew's House, Lincoln
- Kelso Abbey
- Kenilworth Castle
- Kilpeck Church
- Launceston Castle
- Lewes Castle
- Lincoln Castle
- Lindisfarne Priory
- Ludlow Castle
M - Z
- Malmesbury Abbey
- Manorbier Castle
- Margam Abbey
- Melbourne Parish Church
- Newcastle Castle
- Norwich Castle
- Norwich Cathedral
- Oakham Castle
- Orford Castle
- Peel Castle
- Pembroke Castle
- Peterborough Cathedral
- Pickering Castle
- Richmond Castle
- Rochester Castle
- Rochester Cathedral
- Romsey Abbey
- Rougemont Castle, Exeter
- St Albans Cathedral
- St Athernase Church, Leuchars
- St Bartholomew-the-Great, Smithfield
- St Botolph's Priory, Colchester
- St Davids Cathedral
- St Germans Priory
- St John's Church Devizes
- St Kyneburgha's Church Castor, Cambridgeshire
- St. Magnus' Cathedral, Kirkwall
- St Margaret's Chapel Edinburgh Castle
- St Mary de Haura Church, Shoreham-by-Sea
- St Mary's Priory Chepstow
- St Peter's Church, Northampton
- Scarborough Castle
- Shrewsbury Abbey
- Southwell Minster
- Temple Church
- Tewkesbury Abbey
- Tower of London
- Waltham Abbey (abbey)
- Wimborne Minster
- Winchester Cathedral
- Wolvesey Palace, Winchester

== Early Gothic architecture ==
Late 12th century until the mid to late 13th century.

A - L
- Aberystwyth Castle
- Abingdon Abbey
- Alnwick Castle
- Arbroath Abbey
- Basingwerk Abbey
- Battle Abbey
- Bayham Old Abbey
- Beaulieu Abbey
- Beaumaris Castle
- Beeston Castle
- Binham Priory
- Bishop's Palace, Wells
- Bolton Abbey
- Bothwell Castle
- Brechin Cathedral
- Brecon Cathedral
- Bridlington Priory
- Brougham Castle
- Buckland Abbey
- Buildwas Abbey
- Byland Abbey
- Caerlaverock Castle
- Caernarfon Castle
- Caerphilly Castle
- Canterbury Cathedral, the chancel
- Carisbrooke Castle
- Castell y Bere
- Chichester Cathedral
- Chirk Castle
- Cleeve Abbey
- Conisbrough Castle
- Conwy Castle
- Criccieth Castle
- Crossraguel Abbey
- Croxden Abbey
- Cymer Abbey
- Dirleton Castle
- Dolbadarn Castle
- Dore Abbey
- Dornoch Cathedral
- Dundrennan Abbey
- Dunstaffnage Castle
- Easby Abbey
- Elgin Cathedral
- Edinburgh Castle
- Egglestone Abbey
- Finchale Priory
- Flint Castle
- Forde Abbey
- Fountains Abbey
- Furness Abbey
- Glastonbury Abbey
- Glenluce Abbey
- Harlech Castle
- Haughmond Abbey
- Hereford Cathedral
- Hexham Abbey
- Holyrood Abbey
- Inchcolm Abbey
- Jervaulx Abbey
- Kidwelly Castle
- Kildrummy Castle
- Kirkham Priory
- Kirkstall Abbey
- Lanercost Priory
- Lincoln Cathedral
- Llanthony Priory
M - Z
- Middleham Castle
- Monk Bretton Priory
- Muchelney Abbey
- Neath Abbey
- Newark Castle, Nottinghamshire
- Newport Castle
- Paisley Abbey
- Pershore Abbey
- Portsmouth Cathedral the chancel
- Powis Castle
- Rockingham Castle
- Rhuddlan Castle
- Rievaulx Abbey
- Ripon Cathedral
- Roche Abbey
- Rothesay Castle
- St Andrew's Cathedral, St Andrews
- St. Dogmaels Abbey
- St. Machar's Cathedral, Aberdeen
- St Mary's Abbey, York
- St Mary's Church, Tenby
- Church of St Michael the Archangel, Compton Martin
- St. Mungo's Cathedral, Glasgow
- Salisbury Cathedral
- Saltwood Castle
- Sandal Castle
- Selby Abbey
- Shap Abbey
- Southwark Cathedral
- Stokesay Castle
- Strata Florida Abbey
- Sweetheart Abbey
- Talley Abbey
- Thetford Priory
- Tintern Abbey
- Treasurer's House
- Tynemouth Castle and Priory
- Valle Crucis Abbey
- Wells Cathedral
- Westminster Abbey
- Whitby Abbey
- White Castle (Wales)
- Winchester Castle
- Winchester Palace, London
- Woodspring Priory
- Worcester Cathedral

== Decorated and Perpendicular Gothic architecture ==
Late 13th century until the mid 16th century.

A - L
- Amberley Castle
- Angel and Royal Inn Grantham
- Ashton Court
- Athelhampton
- Auckland Castle
- Baddesley Clinton
- Bangor Cathedral
- Barrington Court
- Bath Abbey
- Beverley Minster
- Bodiam Castle
- Bolton Castle
- Bradford on Avon tithe barn
- Bristol Cathedral
- Canterbury Cathedral nave
- Carlisle Cathedral
- Castle Rushen
- Cawdor Castle
- Chester Cathedral
- Chetham's College
- Chichester Cross
- Cleeve Abbey
- Clevedon Court
- Craigmillar Castle
- Croyland Abbey
- Culbone Church
- Denbigh Castle
- Divinity School, Oxford
- Donnington Castle
- Doune Castle
- Dryburgh Abbey
- Dunluce Castle
- Dunstanburgh Castle
- Dunvegan Castle
- Edington Priory
- Eltham Palace
- Ely Cathedral (the lady chapel and octagon)
- Eton College
- Ewelme Almshouses
- Exeter Cathedral
- Farleigh Hungerford Castle
- Fotheringhay Church
- Gainsborough Old Hall
- George Inn Norton St Philip
- George and Pilgrims Inn Glastonbury
- Gisborough Priory
- Gloucester Cathedral
- Goodrich Castle
- Great Chalfield Manor
- Great Coxwell Tithe Barn
- Great Dixter
- Great Malvern Priory
- Haddon Hall
- Hailes Abbey
- Haughmond Abbey
- Hermitage Castle
- Herstmonceux Castle
- Hever Castle
- Holy Rude Church, Stirling
- Holy Trinity Church, Kingston upon Hull
- Holy Trinity Church, Stratford-upon-Avon
- Howden Minster
- Huntly Castle
- Jesus College, Cambridge
- King's College, Aberdeen
- King's College Chapel
- Kirby Muxloe Castle
- Ightham Mote
- Lacock Abbey
- Lancaster Castle
- Leeds Castle
- Leicester Guildhall
- Leiston Abbey
- Lichfield Cathedral
- Linlithgow Palace
- Llandaff Cathedral
- Lytes Cary Manor
M - Z
- Magdalen College, Oxford
- Malvern Priory
- Manchester Cathedral
- Marston Bigot House
- Melrose Abbey
- Merton College, Oxford
- Mount Grace Priory
- Much Wenlock Priory
- Naworth Castle
- Netley Abbey
- New College, Oxford
- Newark Castle, Port Glasgow
- Newcastle Cathedral
- Newport Cathedral
- Newstead Abbey
- Norwich Guildhall
- Old Dee Bridge
- Ottery St Mary Church
- Penrith Castle
- Penshurst Place
- Raby Castle
- Raglan Castle
- Rosslyn Chapel
- Rufford Old Hall
- St Andrews Castle
- St Andrew's Church, Burnham-on-Sea
- St. Augustine's Church, Hedon
- St Catherine's Court
- St Donat's Castle
- St Etheldreda's Church, London
- St George's Chapel at Windsor Castle
- St. Giles' Cathedral
- St John the Baptist's Church Perth
- St Mary's Church Fairford
- St Mary's Church Haddington
- St Mary's Church Melton Mowbray
- St. Mary's Church, Nottingham
- St Mary Redcliffe
- St Mary the Great with St Michael, Cambridge
- St. Michael's Parish Church, Linlithgow
- St Patrick's Church Patrington
- St Peter's and St Paul's Church Northleach
- St Peter's Mancroft Norwich
- St Salvator's College, St Andrews
- St Winefride's Well
- Salisbury Cathedral
- Samlesbury Hall
- Scotney Old Castle
- Sherborne Abbey
- Skipton Castle
- Somerset Rural Life Museum
- Spynie Palace
- Stoke sub Hamdon Priory
- The Stump
- Sudeley Castle
- Swansea Castle
- Tantallon Castle
- Tattershall Castle (Lincolnshire)
- Thaxted Guildhall
- Thornton Abbey
- Threave Castle
- Trinity Bridge (Crowland)
- University Church of St Mary the Virgin, Oxford
- Urquhart Castle
- Walsingham Priory
- Wardour Castle
- Warkworth Castle
- Warwick Castle
- Weobley Castle, Herefordshire
- Weobley Castle, Gower Peninsula
- Westminster Abbey nave
- Westminster Hall
- Whalley Abbey
- Winchester Cathedral nave
- Winchester College
- Wymondham Abbey
- York Castle
- York city walls
- York Guildhall
- York Minster

== Renaissance, Tudor and Jacobean architecture ==
Late 15th century until the mid 17th century.

A - L
- The Abbey, Charlton Adam
- Abersley House, East Sussex
- Abbot's Hospital, Guildford, Surrey
- Acton Court, Gloucestershire
- Astley Hall, Lancashire
- Aston Hall, Birmingham
- Audley End House, Essex
- Bank Hall, Bretherton, Lancashire
- Barlborough Hall, Derbyshire
- Barrington Court, Somerset
- Bell Tower, Evesham Abbey, Worcestershire
- Bessie Surtees House, Newcastle
- Blair Castle, Perth and Kinross
- Blickling Hall, Norfolk
- Bolsover Castle, Derbyshire
- Braemar Castle, Aberdeenshire
- Bramshill House, Hampshire
- Brodick Castle, Isle of Arran
- Brodie Castle, Moray
- Broughton Castle, Oxfordshire
- Burghley House, Lincolnshire
- Burton Agnes Hall, East Riding of Yorkshire
- Burton Constable Hall, East Riding of Yorkshire
- Camber Castle, East Sussex
- Castle Ashby, Northamptonshire
- Castle Fraser, Aberdeenshire
- Charlton House, London
- Chavenage House, Gloucestershire
- Chequers, Buckinghamshire
- Charlecote Park, Warwickshire
- Chastleton, Oxfordshire
- Chilham Castle, Kent
- Christ Church, Oxford
- Christ's College, Cambridge
- Claypotts Castle, Dundee
- Cotehele, Cornwall
- Compton Wynyates, Warwickshire
- Old Cowdray Park, West Sussex (ruined)
- Craigievar Castle, Aberdeenshire
- Crathes Castle, Aberdeenshire
- Culross Palace, Fife
- Dartmouth Castle, Devon
- Deal Castle, Kent
- Doddington Hall, Lincolnshire
- Dunster Castle, Somerset
- East Barsham Manor, Norfolk
- Eastbury Manor House, London
- Edzell Castle, Angus
- Exeter Guildhall, Devon
- Falkland Palace, Fife
- Fountains Hall, North Yorkshire
- Fyvie Castle, Aberdeenshire
- Gawthorpe Hall, Lancashire
- George Heriot's School, Edinburgh
- Gilling Castle, North Yorkshire
- Glamis Castle, Angus
- Gonville and Caius College, Cambridge
- Great Bidlake, Devon
- Gwydir Castle, North Wales
- Halswell House, Somerset
- Hampton Court Palace, London
- Hardwick Hall, Derbyshire
- Old Schools, Harrow School
- Hatfield House, Hertfordshire
- Hengrave Hall, Suffolk
- Henry VII Lady Chapel, Westminster Abbey, London
- Hestercombe House, Somerset
- Hoghton Tower, Lancashire
- Holland House, London
- Kentwell Hall, Suffolk
- King John's Hunting Lodge, Somerset
- Kirby Hall, Northamptonshire
- Knebworth House, Hertfordshire
- Knole, Kent
- Lanhydrock House, Cornwall
- Lauriston Castle, Edinburgh
- Lavenham Guildhall, Suffolk
- Layer Marney Tower, Essex
- Levens Hall, Cumbria
- Lilford Hall, Northamptonshire
- Littlecote House, Wiltshire
- Little Moreton Hall, Cheshire
- Longford Castle, Wiltshire
- Longleat, Wiltshire
- Lord Leycester Hospital, Warwick
- Lullingstone Castle, Kent
- Lulworth Castle, Dorset
- Lyveden New Bield, Northamptonshire
M - Z
- Market Hall, Shrewsbury
- Middle Temple, London
- Montacute House, Somerset
- Nettlecombe Court, Somerset
- Newton Surmaville, Somerset
- Oxburgh Hall, Norfolk
- Paycocke's House, Coggeshall, Essex
- Plas Mawr, Conwy
- Plas Teg, Flintshire
- Portland Castle, Dorset
- Red Lodge Museum, Bristol
- Rothwell Market House, Northamptonshire
- Ruperra Castle, Pembrokeshire
- Rushton Triangular Lodge, Northamptonshire
- Sackville College, Sussex
- St Fagans Castle, Cardiff
- St Giles' Church, Wrexham
- St. James Church, Louth Lincolnshire
- St James's Palace, London
- St John's College, Cambridge
- The Canterbury Quadrangle, St John's College, Oxford
- St Mawes Castle, Cornwall
- St. Margaret's, Westminster, London
- St. Mary Magdalene, Taunton, Somerset
- Sandown Castle, Kent
- Schools Quadrangle, Bodleian Library, Oxford
- Sheffield Manor, South Yorkshire
- Sherborne Castle, Dorset
- Sizergh Castle & Garden, Cumbria
- Southsea Castle, Portsmouth
- Speke Hall, Liverpool
- Stirling Castle, Scotland
- Ston Easton Park, Somerset
- Stonyhurst College, Lancashire
- Sutton House, London Borough of Hackney
- Sutton Place, Surrey
- Temple Newsam, West Yorkshire
- Thornbury Castle, Gloucestershire
- Traquair House, Scottish Borders
- Trerice, Cornwall
- Trinity College, Cambridge
- The Vyne, Hampshire
- Wadham College, Oxford
- Walmer Castle, Kent
- Wollaton Hall, Nottingham
- Wootton Lodge, Ellastone
- Wroxton Abbey, Oxfordshire

== Caroline and interregnum architecture ==
A - L
- Ashburnham House, London
- Ashdown House, Oxfordshire
- Banqueting House, Whitehall, London
- Belton House, Lincolnshire
- Brympton d'Evercy, Somerset
- Charles Church, Plymouth, Devon
- Chevening, Kent
- Church of the Holy Trinity, Berwick-on-Tweed
- Clare College, Cambridge
- Clarendon House, London (demolished)
- Cliveden, Buckinghamshire
- Coleshill House (burnt down)
- Cornbury House
- Eltham Lodge, Kent
- Erddig, Denbighshire
- Forde Abbey, Dorset
- Groombridge Place, Kent
- Gunnersbury Park, London (demolished)
- Ham House, London
- Hamstead Marshall, Berkshire (demolished)
- Hanbury Hall, Worcestershire
- Holyrood Palace, Edinburgh
- Honington Hall
- Hopetoun House, West Lothian
- Horseheath Hall (demolished)
- King Charles block, Greenwich Hospital, London
- Kingston Lacy, Dorset
- Kinross House, Perth and Kinross
- Lambeth Palace Great Hall, London
- Lamport Hall, Northamptonshire
- Lodge Park, Gloucestershire
M - Z
- Melton Constable, Norfolk
- Moulton Hall, North Yorkshire
- Newcastle House, London (demolished)
- Nottingham Castle, Nottingham
- Queen's Chapel, London
- The Queen's House, Greenwich
- Ramsbury Manor
- Raynham Hall, Norfolk
- Rook Lane Chapel, Frome, Somerset
- Royal Citadel, Plymouth
- Royal Exchange, London (burnt down and rebuilt)
- Ryston Hall
- St Catharine's College, Cambridge
- St Katherine Cree, London
- Old St Paul's Cathedral (burnt in Great Fire of London)
- St Ninian's, Brougham, Cumbria
- St Paul's, Covent Garden, London
- Stratfield Saye House, Hampshire
- Staunton Harold Church
- Sudbury Hall, Derbyshire
- Stoke Park, Northamptonshire
- Swakeleys House
- Thirlestane Castle, Scottish Borders
- Thorpe Hall, Northamptonshire
- Tilbury Fort, Essex
- Tredegar House, Newport
- Trinity College, Oxford Chapel
- Tron Kirk, Edinburgh
- University College, Oxford
- Weston Park, Staffordshire
- Wilbury House
- Wilton House, Wiltshire
- Winslow Hall, Buckinghamshire
- Worshipful Society of Apothecaries Hall (rebuilt), London
- Worshipful Company of Barbers Hall (rebuilt on new site), London
- Worshipful Company of Fishmongers Hall (rebuilt), London

== English Baroque architecture ==
A - L
- All Souls College, Oxford
- Appuldurcombe House, Isle of Wight
- Aynhoe Park, Northamptonshire
- Barnsley Park, Gloucestershire
- Beningbrough Hall, North Yorkshire
- Bevis Marks Synagogue, London
- Blenheim Palace, Oxfordshire
- Blyth Hall, Warwickshire
- Boughton House Northamptonshire
- Bramham Park, North Yorkshire
- Buntingsdale, Shropshire
- Burley-on-the-Hill, Rutland
- Castle Howard, North Yorkshire
- Chatelherault, South Lanarkshire
- Chatsworth House, Derbyshire
- Chicheley Hall, Buckinghamshire
- Chillington Hall, Staffordshire
- Christ Church Greyfriars, London (ruin)
- Christ Church, Spitalfields, London
- Clarendon Building, Oxford
- Compton Verney House, Warwickshire
- Dalkeith Palace, Midlothian
- Davenport House, Shropshire
- Debtors Prison, York
- Derby Cathedral
- Ditchley, Oxfordshire
- Drayton House, Northamptonshire
- Drumlanrig Castle, Dumfries and Galloway
- Duff House, Banffshire
- Duncombe Park, North Yorkshire
- Dyrham Park, Gloucestershire
- Eastbury House (largely demolished)
- Easton Neston, Northamptonshire
- Farnborough Hall, Warwickshire
- Fetcham Park, Surrey
- Fort George, Highland
- Gilling Castle, North Yorkshire
- Greenwich Hospital, London
- Grimsthorpe Castle, Lincolnshire
- Hampton Court Palace, London
- Haddo House, Aberdeenshire
- Hamilton Old Parish Church, South Lanarkshire
- Hamilton Palace, South Lanarkshire
- Hanbury Hall, Worcestershire
- Heythrop Hall, Oxfordshire
- Hopetoun House, West Lothian
- House of Dun, Angus
- Inveraray Castle, Argyll
- Kemerton Court, Worcestershire
- Kensington Palace, London
- Kimbolton Castle, Cambridgeshire
- Kings Weston House, Bristol
- King's House, Winchester
- Kirk of St Nicholas, Aberdeen
- Kiveton Park, South Yorkshire
M - Z
- Marlborough House, London
- Mavisbank House, Midlothian
- Mawley Hall, Shropshire
- Montagu House, Bloomsbury, London
- Monument to the Great Fire of London
- Newhailes, Edinburgh
- Ombersley Court, Worcestershire
- Panton Hall, Lincolnshire (demolished)
- Petworth House, West Sussex
- Pollok House, Glasgow
- The Queen's College, Oxford
- Radcliffe Camera, Oxford
- Ragley Hall, Warwickshire
- Royal Hospital Chelsea, London
- Royal Observatory, Greenwich, London
- Ruthven Barracks, Highland
- St Alfege Church, Greenwich, London
- St. Andrew-by-the-Wardrobe, London
- St Anne's Limehouse, London
- St Bartholomew's Hospital, London
- St Benet Paul's Wharf, London
- St Bride's Church, London
- St Clement Danes, London
- St Dunstan-in-the-East, London
- St. George's Church, Bloomsbury, London
- St George's, Hanover Square, London
- St George in the East, London
- St James's Church, Piccadilly, London
- St James Garlickhythe, London
- St John's, Smith Square, London
- St John's Horsleydown, London (bombed during World War II)
- St Lawrence Jewry, London
- St. Luke Old Street, London
- St Magnus-the-Martyr, London
- St Margaret Lothbury, London
- St Margaret Pattens, London
- St Mary Aldermary, London
- St Mary-at-Hill, London
- St Mary-le-Bow, London
- St Mary-le-Strand, London
- St Mary Woolnoth, London
- St Martin-in-the-fields, London
- St. Nicholas Cole Abbey, London
- St Paul's Cathedral, London
- St. Paul's, Deptford, London
- St. Philip's Cathedral, Birmingham
- St Stephen Walbrook, London
- St Vedast Foster Lane, London
- Seaton Delaval Hall, Northumberland
- Senate House, Cambridge
- Sheldonian Theatre, Oxford
- Stanstead Park, West Sussex (burnt down)
- Stoneleigh Abbey, Warwickshire
- Sutton Scarsdale Hall, Derbyshire (ruined)
- Swynnerton Hall, Staffordshire
- Temple Bar, London
- Tom Tower, Oxford
- Uppark, West Sussex
- Vanbrugh Castle, London
- Wentworth Castle, South Yorkshire
- Westminster Abbey, London (towers)
- Wimpole Hall, Cambridgeshire
- Wren Library, Cambridge

== Georgian architecture ==
Around 1720 to around 1840.

A - L
- Abbotsford House, Scottish Borders
- Addington Palace, south London
- The Adelphi, London
- Admiralty House, London
- The Albany, London
- All Hallows-on-the-Wall, London
- All Saints' Church, Nuneham Courtenay
- All Souls Church, Langham Place, London
- Apsley House, London
- Arbury Hall, Warwickshire
- Arlington Court, Devon
- Arno's Court Triumphal Arch, Bristol
- Asgill House, Surrey
- Ashburnham Park, East Sussex
- Ashridge House, Hertfordshire
- Assembly Rooms, Belfast
- Athenaeum Club, London
- Attingham Park, Shropshire
- Aynhoe Park, Northamptonshire
- Bank of England, London
- Barlaston Hall, Staffordshire
- Basildon Park, Berkshire
- Bath Assembly Rooms, Bath
- Beckford's Tower, Bath
- Bedford Square, London
- Belmont Park, Kent
- Belvoir Castle, Leicestershire
- Bentley Priory, London
- Berkeley Square, Bristol
- Berrington Hall, Herefordshire
- Bishopthorpe Palace, York
- Black Castle Public House, Bristol
- Blaise Castle, Bristol
- Blaise Hamlet, Bristol
- Bon-Accord Crescent, Aberdeen
- Bristol Bridge, Bristol
- Broadlands, Hampshire
- Brocket Hall, Hertfordshire
- Brooks's, London
- Bootham Park Hospital, York
- Bowden Park, Wiltshire
- Bowood House, Wiltshire
- Britannia Monument, Great Yarmouth
- British Museum, London
- Bretton Hall, West Yorkshire
- Broadlands, Hampshire
- Brocklesby Mausoleum, Lincolnshire
- Buckingham Palace, London
- Buckland House, Oxfordshire
- Burlington Arcade, London
- Butter Cross, Ludlow, Shropshire
- Bywell Hall, Northumberland
- Canada House, London
- Carlton House, London
- Carlton House Terrace, London
- Castle Coole, County Fermanagh
- Charlotte Square, Edinburgh
- Chester Castle, Chester
- Chester Terrace, London
- Chesterfield House, London
- Chillington Hall, Staffordshire
- Chiswick House, London
- Christ Church Library, Oxford
- Chute Lodge, Wiltshire
- The Circus, Bath
- City Observatory, Edinburgh
- Clandon House, Surrey
- Claremont, Surrey
- Claverton Manor, Somerset
- Claydon House, Buckinghamshire
- Cleveland Bridge, Bath
- Clifton Hill House, Bristol
- Coalbrookdale, Staffordshire
- Combermere Abbey, Cheshire
- Coldstream Bridge, Scottish Borders / Northumberland
- Compton Verney House, Warwickshire
- Constable Burton Hall, North Yorkshire
- Conishead Priory, Cumbria
- Conwy Suspension Bridge, Conwy
- Corpus Christi College, Cambridge
- Corsham Court, Wiltshire
- County Buildings, Perth
- The Covered Market, Oxford
- Craigellachie Bridge, Moray
- Croft Castle, Herefordshire
- Cronkhill, Shropshire
- Culzean Castle, South Ayrshire
- Cumberland Terrace, London
- Cusworth Hall, South Yorkshire
- Dalmeny House, Edinburgh
- Danson House, London
- Darnley Mausoleum, Kent
- HM Prison Dartmoor, Devon
- Dean Bridge, Edinburgh
- Dean Orphanage, Edinburgh
- Derwent Valley Mills, Derbyshire
- Devonshire House, London
- Dinton House, Wiltshire
- Doddington Hall, Cheshire
- Dollar Academy, Clackmannanshire
- Donaldson's College, Edinburgh
- Dover House, London
- Downing College, Cambridge
- Dugald Stewart Monument, Edinburgh
- Duke of York Column, London
- Duke of York's Headquarters, London
- Dulwich Picture Gallery, London
- Dunmore Pineapple, Falkirk
- East Cowes Castle, Isle of Wight (demolished)
- East India House, London
- Eastnor Castle, Herefordshire
- Egyptian Hall, London
- Elvaston Castle, Derbyshire
- Ely House, London
- Endsleigh Cottage, Devon
- Enniskillen County Gaol, County Fermanagh
- Etruria Hall, Staffordshire
- Euston Arch, London
- Euston Hall, Suffolk
- The Exchange, Bristol
- Finsbury Circus, London
- Fitzroy Square, London
- Floors Castle, Scottish Borders
- Florence Court, County Fermanagh
- Fonthill Abbey, Wiltshire
- Foremarke Hall, Derbyshire
- Fort Belvedere, Surrey
- Freemasons' Hall, Bath (now Friends' Meeting House)
- Frogmore House, Berkshire
- Gallery of Modern Art, Glasgow
- Glenarm Castle, County Antrim
- Gloucester Shire Hall
- Goodwood House, West Sussex
- Gorhambury House, Hertfordshire
- Gosford House, East Lothian
- Great Pulteney Street, Bath
- Grey Street, Newcastle
- Grosvenor Bridge, Chester
- Gwrych Castle, Conwy
- Hagley Hall, Worcestershire
- Haileybury College, Hertfordshire
- Hamilton Palace, South Lanarkshire
- Hammerwood Park, East Sussex
- Harewood House, West Yorkshire
- Harleyford Manor, Buckinghamshire
- Hartwell House, Buckinghamshire
- Hatchlands Park, Surrey
- Haymarket Theatre, London
- Heaton Hall, Manchester
- Hereford Shire Hall
- Heveningham Hall, Suffolk
- Hillsborough Castle, County Down
- Holburne Museum of Art, Bath
- Holkham Hall, Norfolk
- Holwood House, London
- Holy Trinity Church Marylebone, London
- Horse Guards, London
- Houghton Hall, Norfolk
- Huddersfield railway station, West Yorkshire
- Ickworth House, Suffolk
- The Iron Bridge, Shropshire
- Kedleston Hall, Derbyshire
- Kenwood House, London
- Kew Palace, London
- Killerton, Devon
- King's College London
- Lambton Castle, County Durham
- Lancaster House, London
- Lansdown Crescent, Bath
- Lansdown Crescent, Cheltenham
- Lansdowne House, London
- Lilford Hall, Northamptonshire
- Lincoln County Courts
- Liverpool Town Hall, Liverpool
- London Bridge, London
- Londonderry House, London
- Lowther Castle, Cumbria
- Luscombe Castle, Devon
- Luton Hoo, Bedfordshire
- The Lyceum, Liverpool
- Lydiard House, Wiltshire
- Lyme Park, Cheshire
- Lytham Hall, Lancashire
M - Z
- Magdalen Bridge, Oxford
- Maidenhead Bridge, Berkshire / Buckinghamshire
- Mansion House, Doncaster, South Yorkshire
- Mansion House, London
- Marble Arch, London
- Marble Hill House, London
- Marischal College, Aberdeen
- Mellerstain House, Scottish Borders
- Menai Suspension Bridge, Anglesey
- Mereworth Castle, Kent
- Millbank Prison, London
- Milton Abbey, Dorset
- Mistley Towers, Essex
- Moggerhanger House, Bedfordshire
- Moor Park, Hertfordshire
- Music Hall, Aberdeen
- National Gallery, London
- National Gallery of Scotland, Edinburgh
- National Monument, Edinburgh
- Neston Park, Wiltshire
- New College, Edinburgh
- New Lanark, South Lanarkshire
- Newby Hall, North Yorkshire
- Norfolk House, London
- Norris Castle, Isle of Wight
- North Parade, Bath
- Northington Grange, Hampshire
- Nostell Priory, West Yorkshire
- Old College, Royal Military Academy Sandhurst, Berkshire
- Old College, University of Edinburgh
- Old Council House, Bristol
- The Oratory, Liverpool
- Osterley Park, London
- Palladian Bridge, Wilton, Wiltshire
- Pantheon, London
- Paxton House, Scottish Borders
- Paxton's Tower, Carmarthenshire
- Peckwater Quadrangle, Oxford
- Pellwall House
- Penrice Castle, Glamorgan
- Penshaw Monument, Tyne and Wear
- Pickford's House Museum, Derby
- Piece Hall, Halifax
- Piercefield House, Monmouthshire (ruined)
- Pittville Pump Room, Cheltenham
- Pitzhanger Manor, London
- Pontcysyllte Aqueduct, Wrexham
- Port Eliot, Cornwall
- Portico Library, Manchester
- Portland Place, London
- Portland Square, Bristol
- Prior Park, Bath
- Pulteney Bridge, Bath
- Pump Room, Bath
- Quarry Bank Mill, Cheshire
- Queen Square, Bath
- Radcliffe Observatory, Oxford
- Ravensworth Castle, County Durham
- Redland Chapel, Bristol
- Richmond Bridge, London
- Royal Artillery Barracks, London
- Royal College of Physicians of Edinburgh
- Royal College of Surgeons of Edinburgh
- Royal College of Surgeons of England, London
- Royal Crescent, Bath
- Royal Fort, Bristol
- Royal High School, Edinburgh
- Royal Mews, Charing Cross, London (demolished)
- Royal Military Academy, Woolwich, London
- Royal Mint, London
- Royal Mineral Water Hospital, Bath
- Royal Pavilion, Brighton
- The Royal School, Armagh
- Royal Scottish Academy Building, Edinburgh
- Royal United Hospital, Bath
- Royal William Victualling Yard, Plymouth
- Ryston Hall
- St Andrew's Cathedral, Glasgow
- St Anne's Church, Soho, London
- St Anne's Church, Wandsworth, London
- St Bartholomew-the-Less, London
- St Botolph's Church, Bishopsgate, London
- St Chad's Church, Shrewsbury
- St Dunstan-in-the-West, London
- St George's Hospital, London (now The Lanesborough hotel)
- St Giles Church, Elgin, Moray
- St Giles in the Fields, London
- St Helen's House, Derby
- St. James's Square, London
- St John's Bethnal Green, London
- St Leonard's, Shoreditch, London
- St Mary's Church, Bridgnorth, Shropshire
- St Mary's, Bryanston Square, London
- St Mary's Church, Stockport, Greater Manchester
- St Marylebone Parish Church, London
- St Pancras New Church, London
- St Patrick's Cathedral, Armagh
- St Paul's Walden Bury, Hertfordshire
- St Peter's Church, Walworth, London
- St Philip's Church, Salford
- St. Stephen's Church, Edinburgh
- Salisbury Guildhall, Wiltshire
- Saltram House, Plymouth
- Sandridge Park, Devon
- Scone Palace, Perth and Kinross
- Scott Monument, Edinburgh
- Seaford House, London
- Sezincote House, Gloucestershire
- Sharpham House
- Sheffield Park House, East Sussex
- Shrewsbury Foundling Hospital, Shropshire
- Shrewsbury Infirmary, Shropshire
- Shrewsbury Prison, Shropshire
- Shrewsbury Shire Hall, Shropshire
- Shugborough Hall, Staffordshire
- Sir John Soane's Museum, London
- Somerset House, London
- South Parade, Bath
- Spencer House, London
- Stoke Poges Park, Buckinghamshire
- Ston Easton Park, Somerset
- Stourhead House, Wiltshire
- Stowe House, Buckinghamshire
- Stracathro House
- Stratton Park, Hampshire
- Syon House, London
- Tabley House, Cheshire
- Tatton Hall, Cheshire
- Taymouth Castle, Perth and Kinross
- Temple Works, Leeds
- Theatre Royal, Bath
- Theatre Royal, Bristol
- Theatre Royal, Bury St Edmunds, Suffolk
- Theatre Royal, Drury Lane, London
- Theatre Royal, Newcastle
- Theatre Royal, Plymouth
- Thorndon Hall, Essex (a partial ruin)
- Throckley Hall, Newcastle
- Tolbooth Church, Edinburgh
- Tregothnan, Cornwall
- Trinity House, London
- University College London
- Victoria Rooms, Bristol
- Wanstead House, London
- Wardour Castle, Wiltshire
- Wedderburn Castle, Scottish Borders
- Wellington Arch, London
- Wentworth Woodhouse, South Yorkshire
- West Wycombe Park, Buckinghamshire
- White Lodge, Richmond Park
- Willey Park
- Windsor Castle, Berkshire (remodelling)
- Woburn Abbey, Bedfordshire
- Wolterton Hall, Norfolk
- Woodcote Park, Surrey
- Woolverstone Hall, Suffolk
- Worcester College, Oxford
- Worksop Manor, Nottinghamshire
- Wotton House, Buckinghamshire
- Wrotham Park, Hertfordshire
- Wynyard Park, County Durham
- York Assembly Rooms, York
- The Yorkshire Museum, York

== See also ==
- Anglo-Saxon architecture
- Architecture of the United Kingdom
- Prehistoric Britain
- Roman Britain
- Timeline of architectural styles
- List of country houses in the United Kingdom
- Nikolaus Pevsner
