= 1726 in architecture =

The year 1726 in architecture involved some significant events.

== Buildings and structures ==
=== Buildings ===
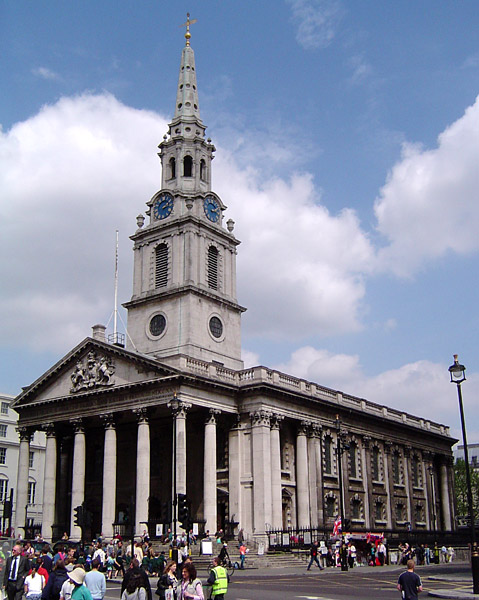
St Martin-in-the-Fields, London

- Work begins on the Dresden Frauenkirche, in Dresden, Germany, designed by George Bähr (completed in 1743; destroyed in 1945; reconstructed in 2005).
- Completion of St Martin-in-the-Fields Church, London, designed by James Gibbs.

== Awards ==
- Grand Prix de Rome, architecture: François Carlier.

== Births ==
- February 15 – Teodoro Ardemans, Spanish architect and painter
- November 15 – Henry Keene, English architect (died 1776)

== Deaths ==
- March 26 – Sir John Vanbrugh, English dramatist and architect (born 1664)
- September 16 – Jakob Prandtauer, Austrian Baroque architect (born 1660)
