= 1859 in architecture =

The year 1859 in architecture involved some significant architectural events and new buildings.

== Buildings and structures ==
=== Buildings ===
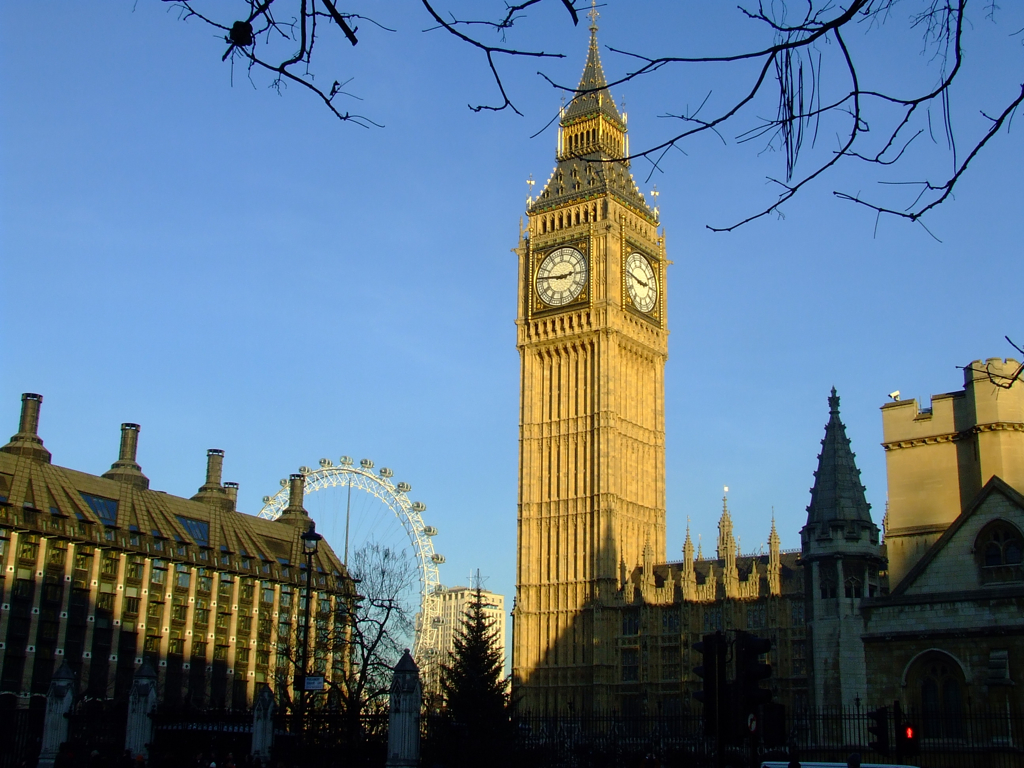
Big Ben in London, England

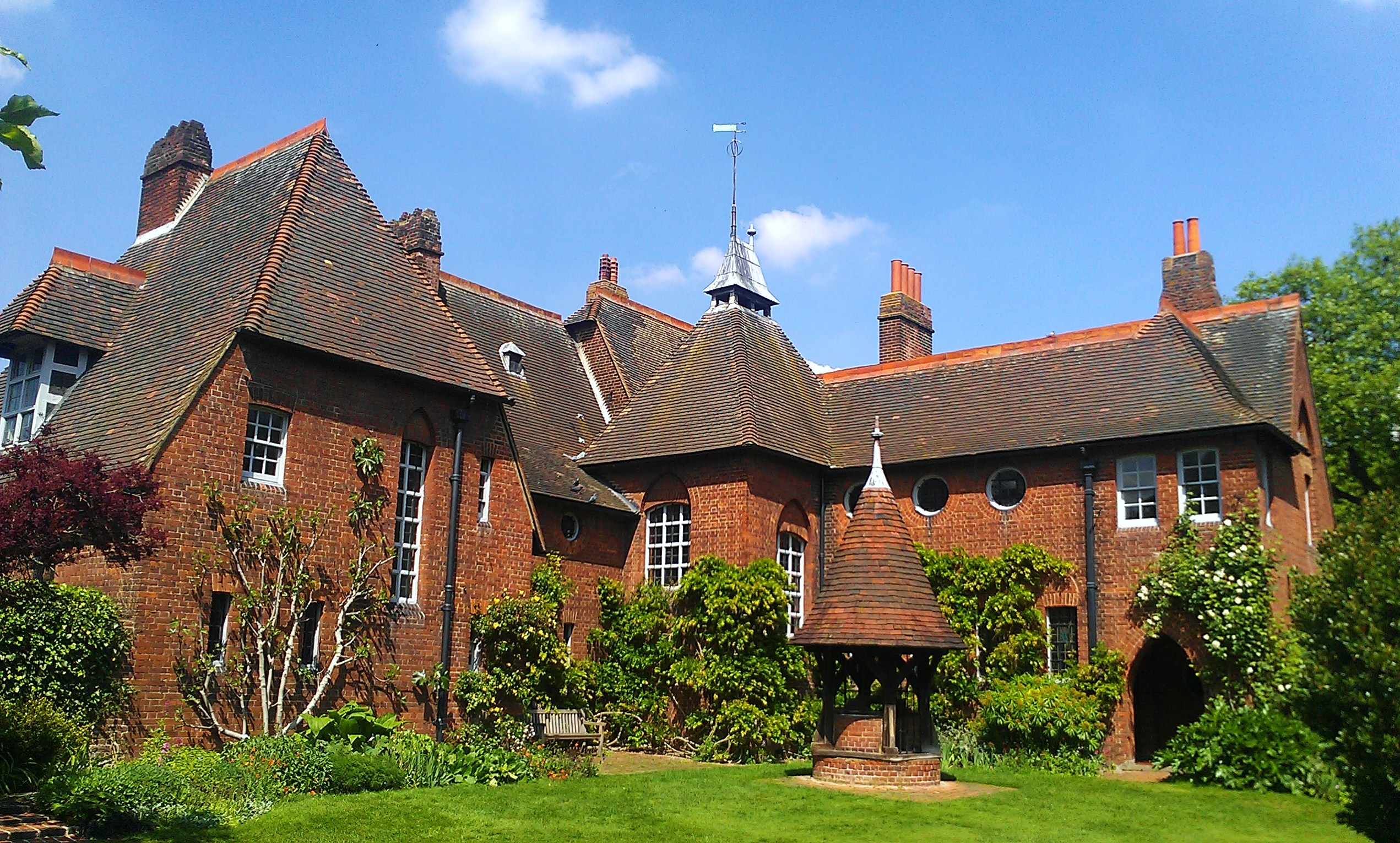
Red House, Bexleyheath

- May 28 – All Saints, Margaret Street, London, designed by William Butterfield, is consecrated.
- September 7 – "Big Ben" in the clock tower of the Palace of Westminster in London completed by Sir Charles Barry to the designs of Augustus Pugin becomes fully operational.
- October 18 – New chapel at Exeter College, Oxford, designed by George Gilbert Scott, is dedicated.
- Red House in Bexleyheath, England designed by Philip Webb and William Morris.
- The Cooper Union for Advancement of Science and Art in New York City, founded by Peter Cooper is born with the completion of The Foundation Building, designed by Prussian-born architect and civil engineer Fred A. Petersen.
- Tennessee State Capitol in Nashville, Tennessee, United States, designed by William Strickland, is completed.
- Third Vermont State House, designed by Thomas Silloway, in Montpelier, Vermont, United States, is completed.
- Vigadó of Pest (concert hall) in Hungary, designed by Frigyes Feszl, is built.
- Main cell block of Fremantle Prison in Western Australia, designed by Brevet Major Edmund Henderson, is completed.
- Needles Lighthouse on The Needles off the Isle of Wight, designed by James Walker, is built.

== Awards ==
- RIBA Royal Gold Medal – George Gilbert Scott.
- Grand Prix de Rome, architecture: Charles Thierry and Louis Boitte.

== Births ==
- February 13 – Zsigmond Quittner, Hungarian commercial architect (died 1918)
- March 3 – Konstantīns Pēkšēns, Latvian architect (died 1928)
- August 7 – Fyodor Schechtel, Russian architect, graphic artist and stage designer (died 1926)
- September 13 – Anton Rosen, Danish architect, furniture designer and decorative artist (died 1928)
- November 29 – Cass Gilbert, American architect (died 1934)
- December 15 – Stewart Henbest Capper, Manx-born Arts and Crafts architect (died 1925)

== Deaths ==
- May 18 – William Donthorne, English architect, one of the founders of what becomes the Royal Institute of British Architects (RIBA) (born 1799)
- September 15 – Isambard Kingdom Brunel, English railway civil and marine engineer and bridge builder (born 1806; stroke)
- October 12 – Robert Stephenson, English railway civil and mechanical engineer (born 1803)
- December 12 — Thomas Alexander Tefft, American architect based in Providence, Rhode Island (born 1826)
