= 1826 in architecture =

The year 1826 in architecture involved some significant architectural events and new buildings.

== Buildings and structures ==
=== Buildings opened ===
- January 30 – The Menai Suspension Bridge over the Menai Strait in Wales, designed by Thomas Telford.
- December 17 – Helsinki Old Church, designed by Carl Ludvig Engel.

=== Buildings completed ===
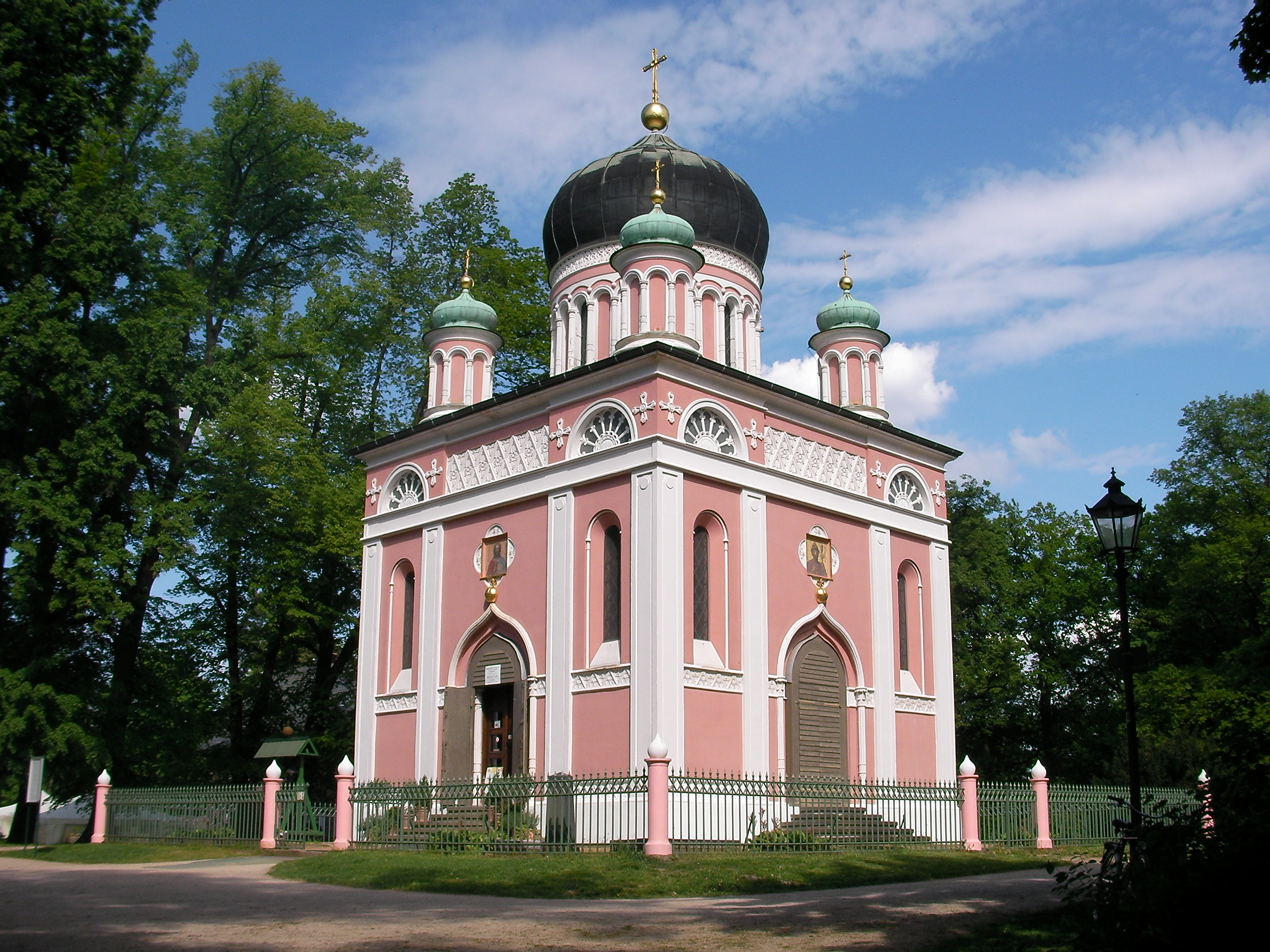
The oldest statement of Russian Revival, Stasov's Alexander Nevsky Memorial Church in Potsdam, Germany

- Cathedral of Chihuahua, Mexico.
- The Bank of England in London, designed by Sir John Soane.
- Cumberland Terrace in London, designed by John Nash and John Thompson.
- Alexander Nevsky Memorial Church in Potsdam, a very early example of Byzantine Revival architecture designed by Vasily Stasov.
- Stadttempel, Vienna, Austria.
- Sofienbad, Vienna, Austria.

== Awards ==
- Grand Prix de Rome – Léon Vaudoyer

== Births ==
- April 11 – Thomas Worthington, English architect based in Manchester (died 1909)
- July 18 – Edward Habershon, English architect (died 1900)
- August 2 — Thomas Alexander Tefft, American architect based in Providence, Rhode Island (died 1859)
- August 16 – Thomas Seaton Scott, Canadian architect (died 1895)

== Deaths ==
- March 1 – Friedrich Weinbrenner, German architect and city planner (born 1766)
- July 4 – Thomas Jefferson, American polymath and neoclassical architect (born 1743)
