= Alexandrowka (Potsdam) =

Russian colony north of the city Potsdam

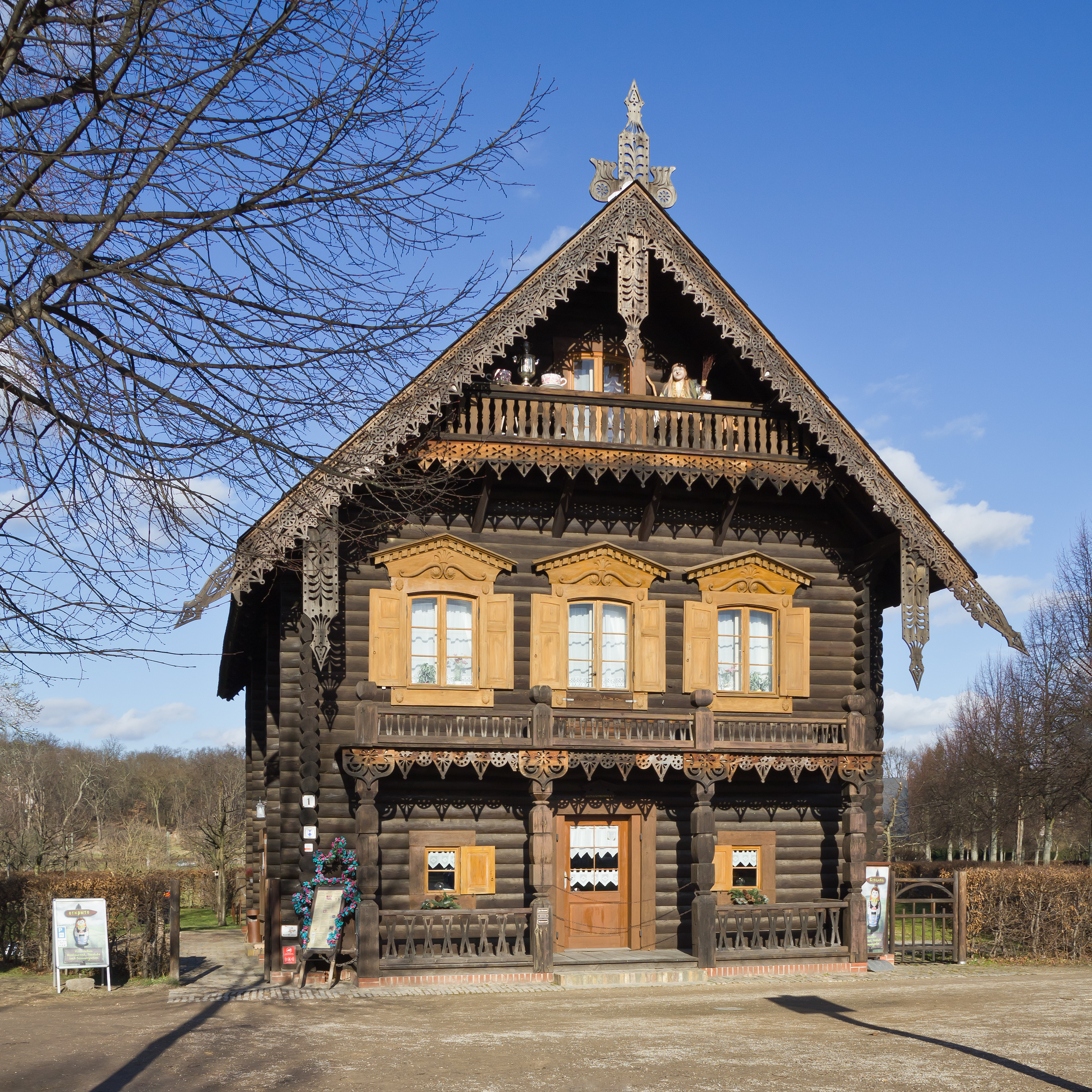
A typical house in the Alexandrovka colony

The Russian colony of Alexandrowka is located north of downtown Potsdam. It was built in 1826-1827 by King Frederick William III of Prussia for the last twelve Russian singers in a choir that had previously 62 members.

Alexandrowka was named after Tsar Alexander I as a tribute to the strong ties between the Hohenzollern and Romanov families. This name was chosen following the death of Tsar Alexander I in 1825. The colony is currently part of the UNESCO World Heritage site of Potsdam Castles and Parks, as it constitutes an integral part of Potsdam's cultural landscape.

== History ==
In 1806, the Prussian-Saxon army was defeated by Napoleonic forces at the battle of Jena and Auerstedt. After Napoleon's victory over Prussia in 1812, France and Prussia were compelled to form an alliance against Russia.

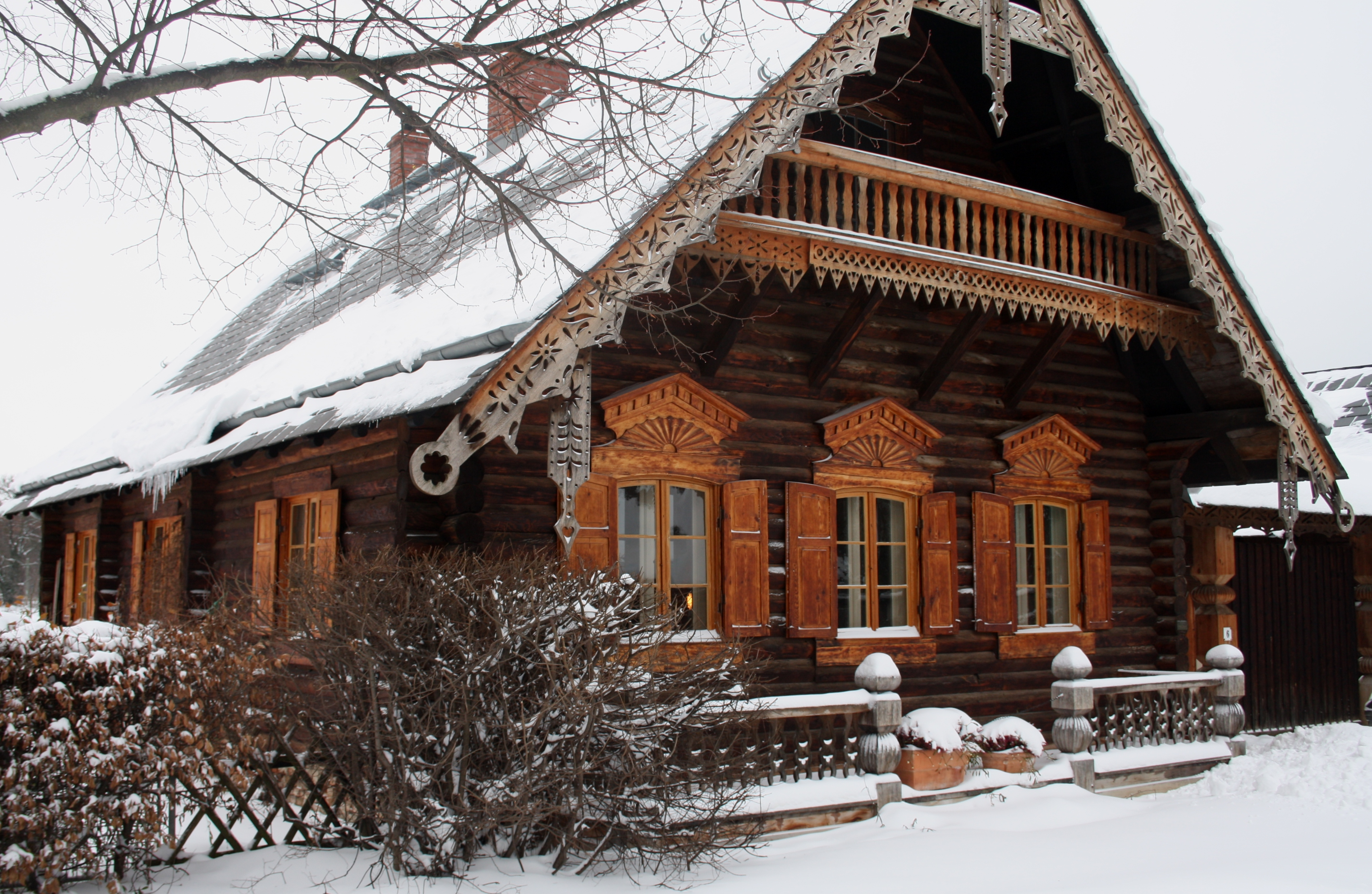
Colonist House #6

Out of the significant number of Russian soldiers captured in Russia during 1812, 62 soldiers remained in Potsdam by October of that year. A choir was formed from this group and officially affiliated with the King's 1st Prussian Guard Regiment. After the signing of the neutrality agreement known as the Convention of Tauroggen on 30 December 1812, Prussia and Russia became allies against France in the spring of 1813. At the request of the Prussian king, most of the former prisoners of war who were Russian soldiers were integrated into a separate regiment. Russian and Prussian troops, along with former Russian prisoners of war and Prussian deserters, joined forces under common leadership to fight against Napoleon. Tsar Alexander I not only permitted the soldiers' choir to remain in Prussia, but he also transferred seven grenadiers from one of his regiments to the king's guard regiment. The choir of former Russian prisoners of war continued to provide entertainment in the king's army camp, and losses in its ranks were compensated in 1815 by the transfer of additional grenadiers from a Russian regiment.

When Tsar Alexander I died in 1825, only 12 of these Russian singers were still living in Potsdam. On 10 April 1826 Frederick William III issued the following order:

"It is My intention, as a lasting monument to the memory of the bonds of friendship between Me and the High Seas Emperor Alexander of Russia's Majesty, to found a colony near Potsdam, which I intend to occupy with the Russian Singers given to Me by His Majesty as Colonists and name Alexandrowka."

— Friedrich Wilhelm III.

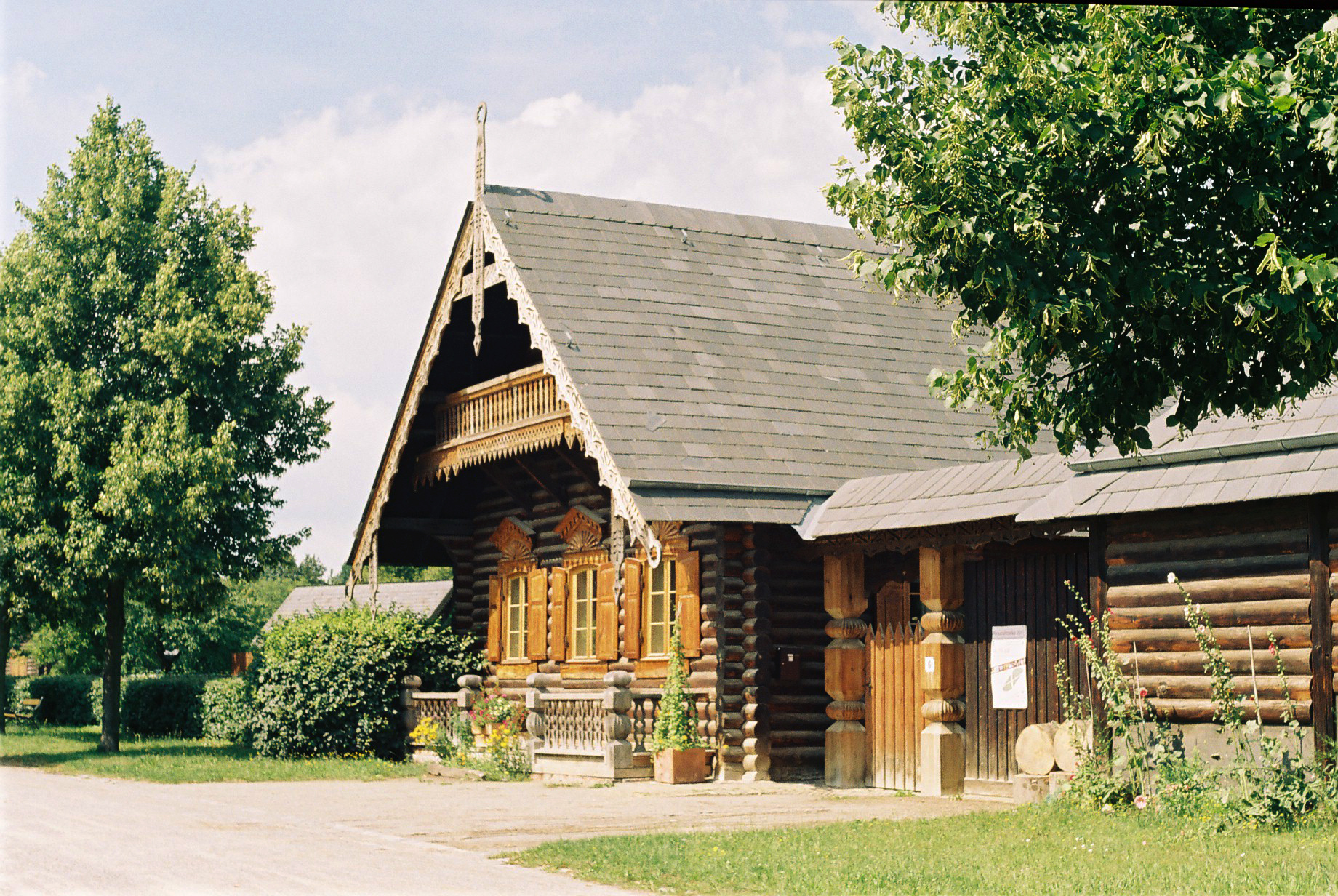
House no. 6 in the summer

The new residents moved into the fully furnished estates in 1827. Every household received a cow, and the gardens were carefully designed to accommodate their needs. While the colonists had the right to pass down their holdings to male descendants, they were prohibited from selling, renting, or mortgaging the properties.

A Russian Orthodox memorial church, named Alexander Nevsky, was built on Chapel Hill and consecrated in September 1829. Adjacent to the church is the fourteenth residential house, which was inhabited by Tarnowsky, a royal footman of Russian origin.

The last singer died in 1861. After a century the founding of the Russian colony, only four families remained, and following the land reform, only two families could trace their direct lineage back to the original singers. The last member of the Shishkoff family, associated with the colony, died in 2008. Initially, the colony was privately owned by the House of Hohenzollern until it was expropriated in 1926. However, military control over the colony was held by the 1st Guards Regiment on Foot. It was only after the disbandment of the regiment in 1919 that the House of Hohenzollern took over the maintenance of the location. The previous royal laws governing the obligations and privileges of the citizens remained in effect until 1945. Fundamental changes in the legal status of the colony and its residents occurred during the period of the Soviet Zone of Occupation (SBZ) and the German Democratic Republic (GDR). Following German reunification, the majority of the homes have been privately owned.

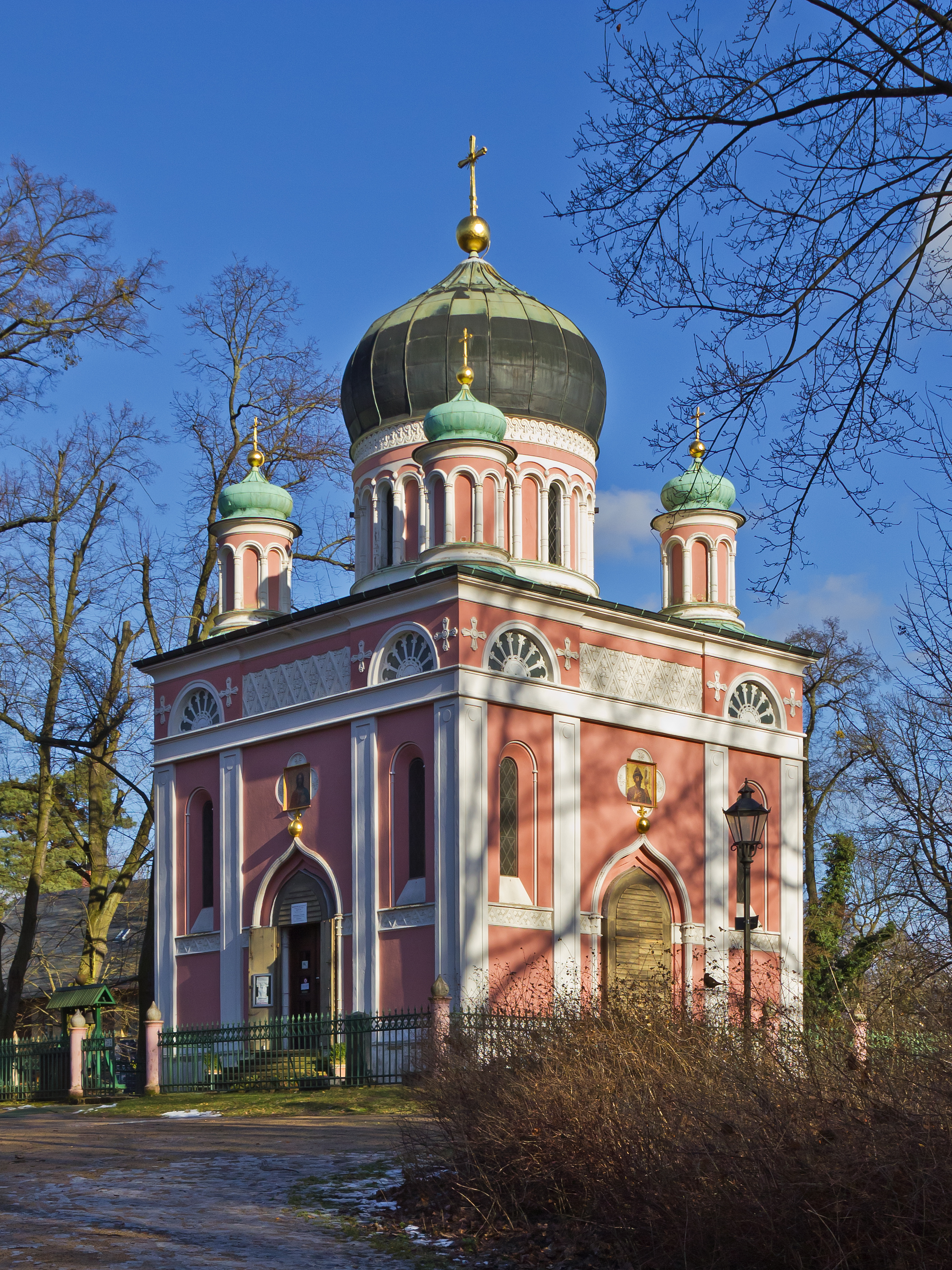
Alexander Nevsky Memorial Church

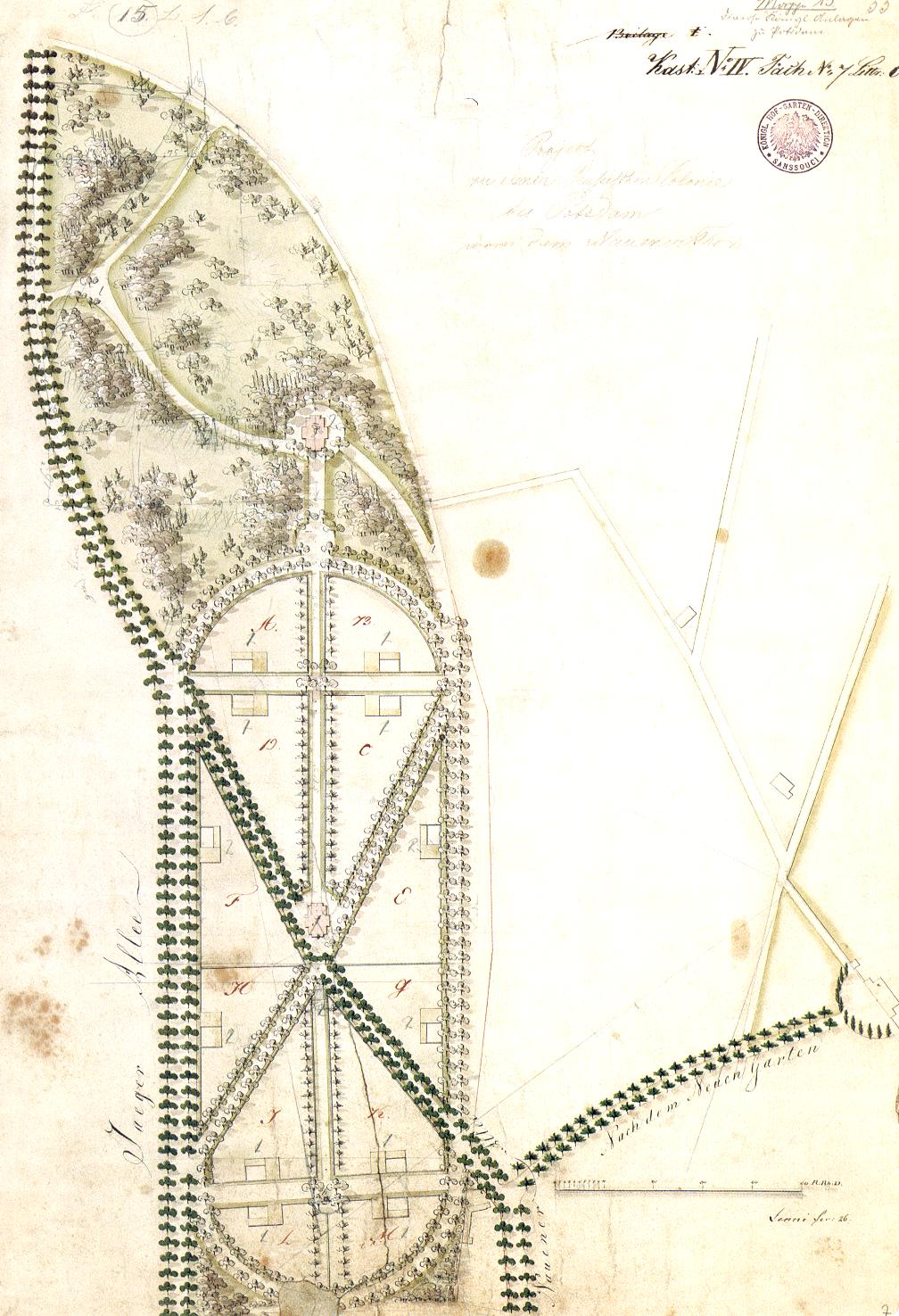
Plan drawing by Peter Joseph Lenné, 1826. The central axis and the transverse axes were not executed.

== Plant and architecture ==
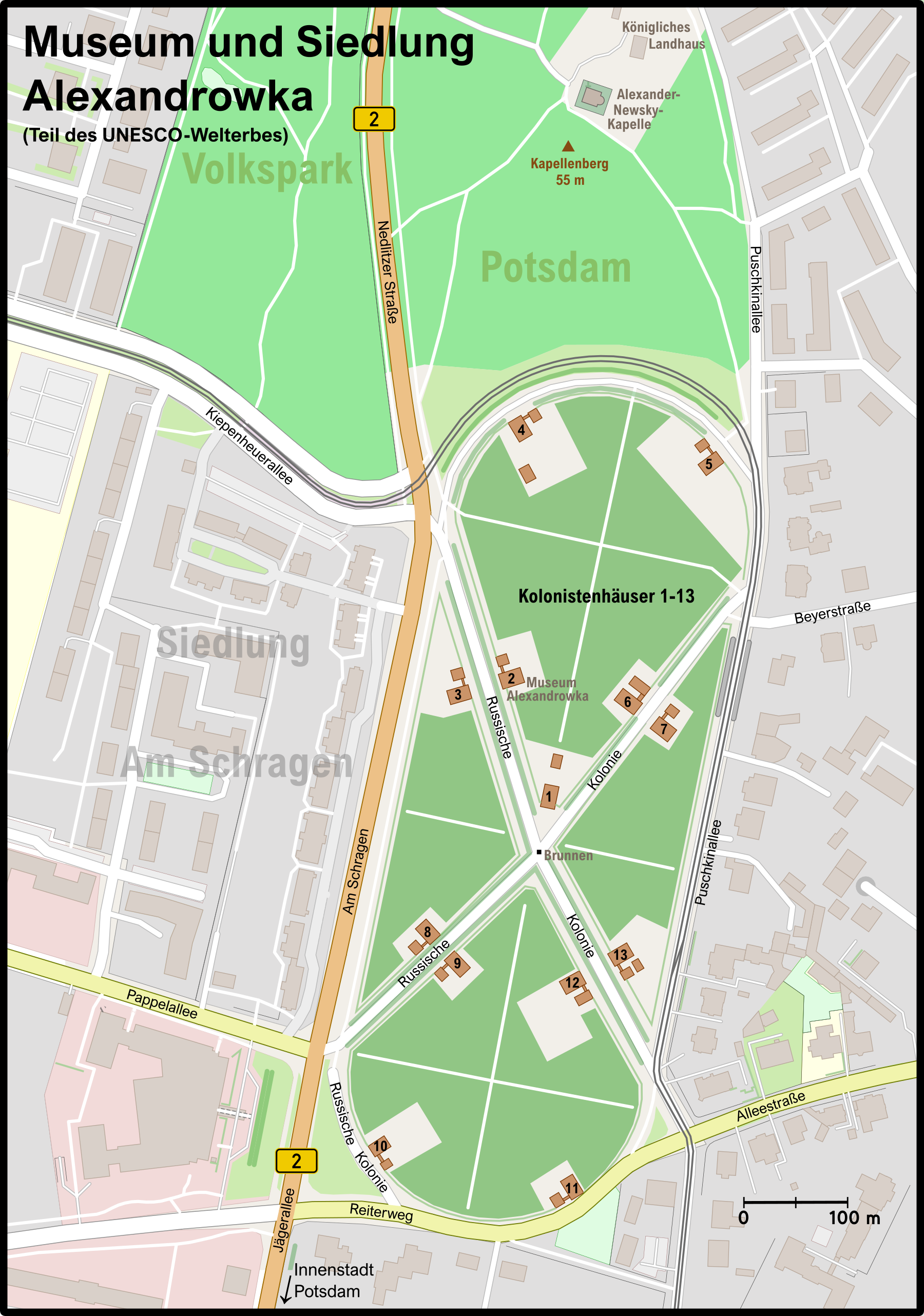
Map of the Russian settlement of Alexandrovka

Peter Joseph Lenné, the garden director, gave the entire area the fundamental design of a hippodrome, incorporating a St. Andrew's cross. At the intersection of the cross, the sergeant's residence was situated, following two distinct designs. The implementation of this design was carried out under the supervision of court gardener Johann Georg Morsch the Elder.

The architectural plans for the buildings were Prussian interpretations of an illustration by the Italo-Russian architect Carlo Rossi, who designed a "typically Russian" village for the tsarina's mother for the Pavlovsk Park in 1815 and later shared a sketch with the Prussian king after his visit to the tsarina's mother in 1818. The half-timbered homes were built by military craftsmen from all Prussian guard regiments and had frontal semi-circular logs that externally resembled Russian log homes. The idea for this economic measure came from the commander of the Guards Engineering Unit, Captain Snethlage, who had already been in charge of the construction of an earlier, genuine blockhouse based on Rossi's design - the Blockhaus Nikolskoë.

The settlement comprises a total of twelve homesteads, featuring detached gabled houses ranging from one to two stories. Additionally, there is a two-story warden's house that does not have a spacious garden. Near the church, there is a house where the warden of the royal tea room resided on the second floor.

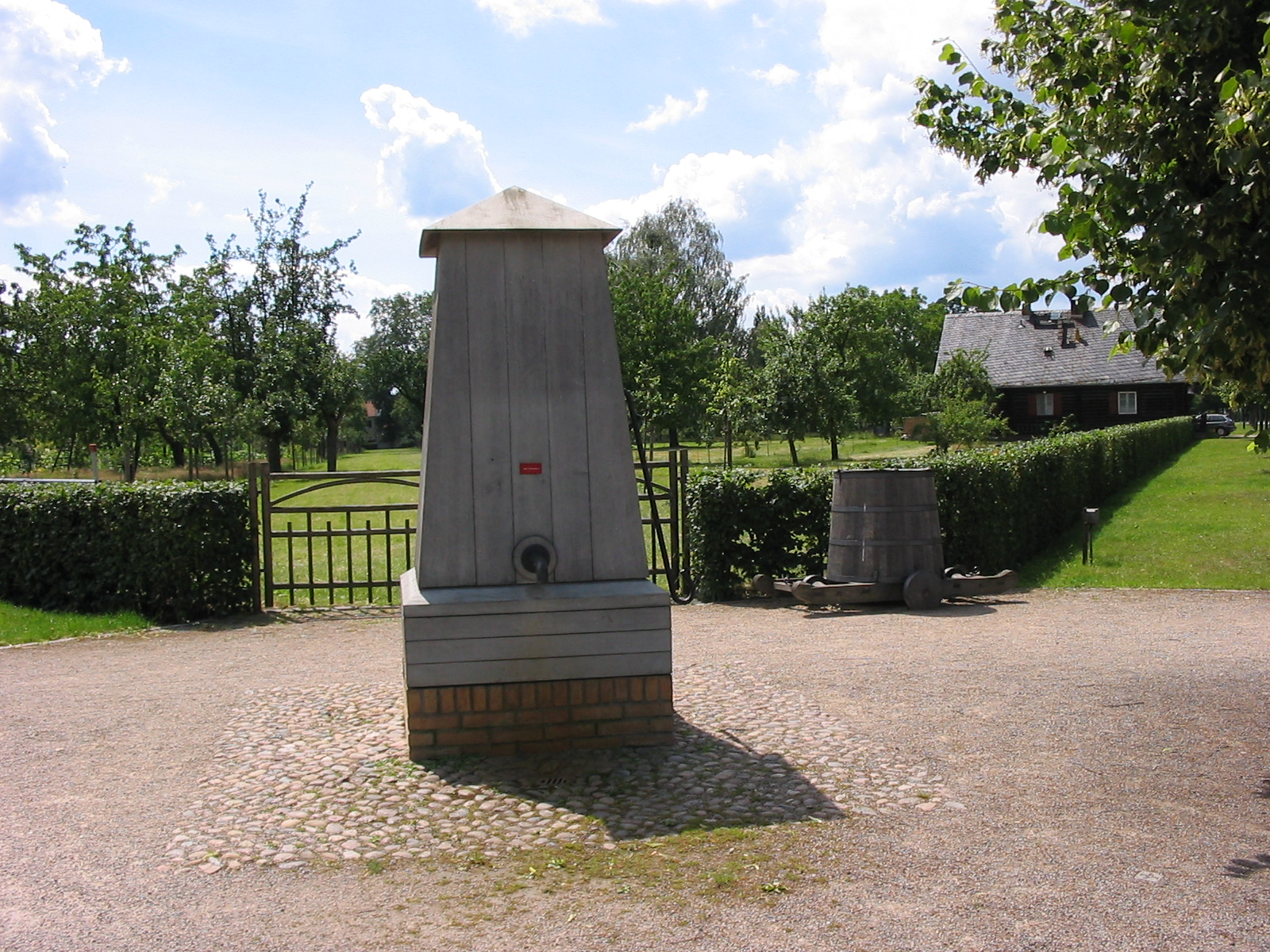
Alexandrowka-Brunnen.jpg

The Prussian version chose wooden boarding, which was later replaced by slate roofing at the end of the 19th century. In accordance with the Russian model, the roofs of the houses were originally intended to be covered with straw. Each farmhouse consists of a residence with a balcony and a loggia in front, connected to a small stable building through a covered entrance.

The Alexandrovka Museum, situated in House No. 2 of the Russian Colony, was established in January 2005. It offers visitors a unique opportunity to explore the history and architectural design of the blockhouses. The museum showcases the construction techniques and provides detailed explanations about the rich history of this distinctive settlement through various informational panels.
