= Ryston =

Village in Norfolk, England

Coordinates: 52.58386°N 0.403061°E

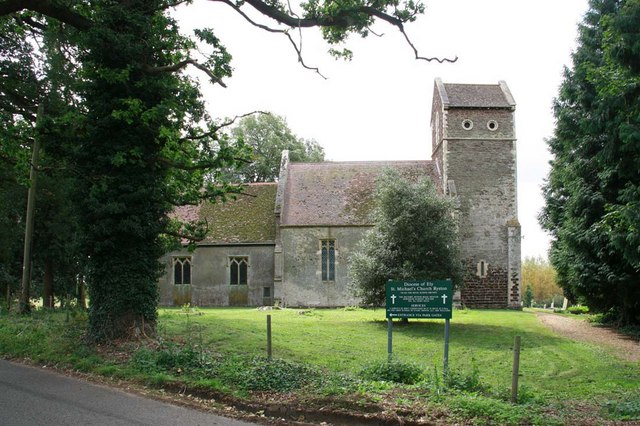
- St Michael's Church

- Location within Norfolk
- Area: 9.36 km^{2} (3.61 sq mi)
- Population: 178
  - Density: 19/km^{2} (49/sq mi)
- OS grid reference: TF629011
- Civil parish: Ryston
- District: King's Lynn and West Norfolk
- Shire county: Norfolk
- Region: East
- Country: England
- Sovereign state: United Kingdom
- Post town: DOWNHAM MARKET
- Postcode district: PE38
- Police: Norfolk
- Fire: Norfolk
- Ambulance: East of England

Ryston is a small village and civil parish in the English county of Norfolk. It once had its own railway station.

The village's name means 'Brushwood farm/settlement'.

It covers an area of 9.36 km^{2} (3.61 sq mi) and had a population of 93 in 34 households at the 2001 census, the population increasing to 178 at the 2011 census. For the purposes of local government, it falls within the district of King's Lynn and West Norfolk.

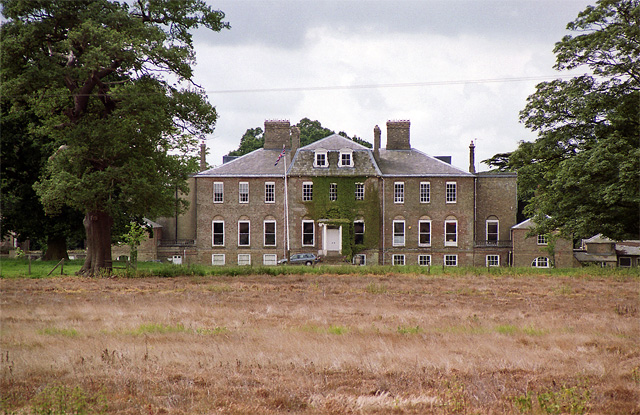
Ryston Hall

St Michael's parish church dates from the 12th century and was restored in 1901. It is a Grade II* listed building.

Ryston Hall is a Grade II* listed country house, built 1669-72 by the architect Sir Roger Pratt as his own home in 1669. It was later remodelled c.1780 by Sir John Soane and again by Anthony Salvin in 1867. The formal gardens and woodland walks are open to the public several times a year.

Ryston railway station opened in 1882; it was closed to passengers in 1930.

== Notes ==
http://kepn.nottingham.ac.uk/map/place/Norfolk/Ryston
