= Ryston Hall =

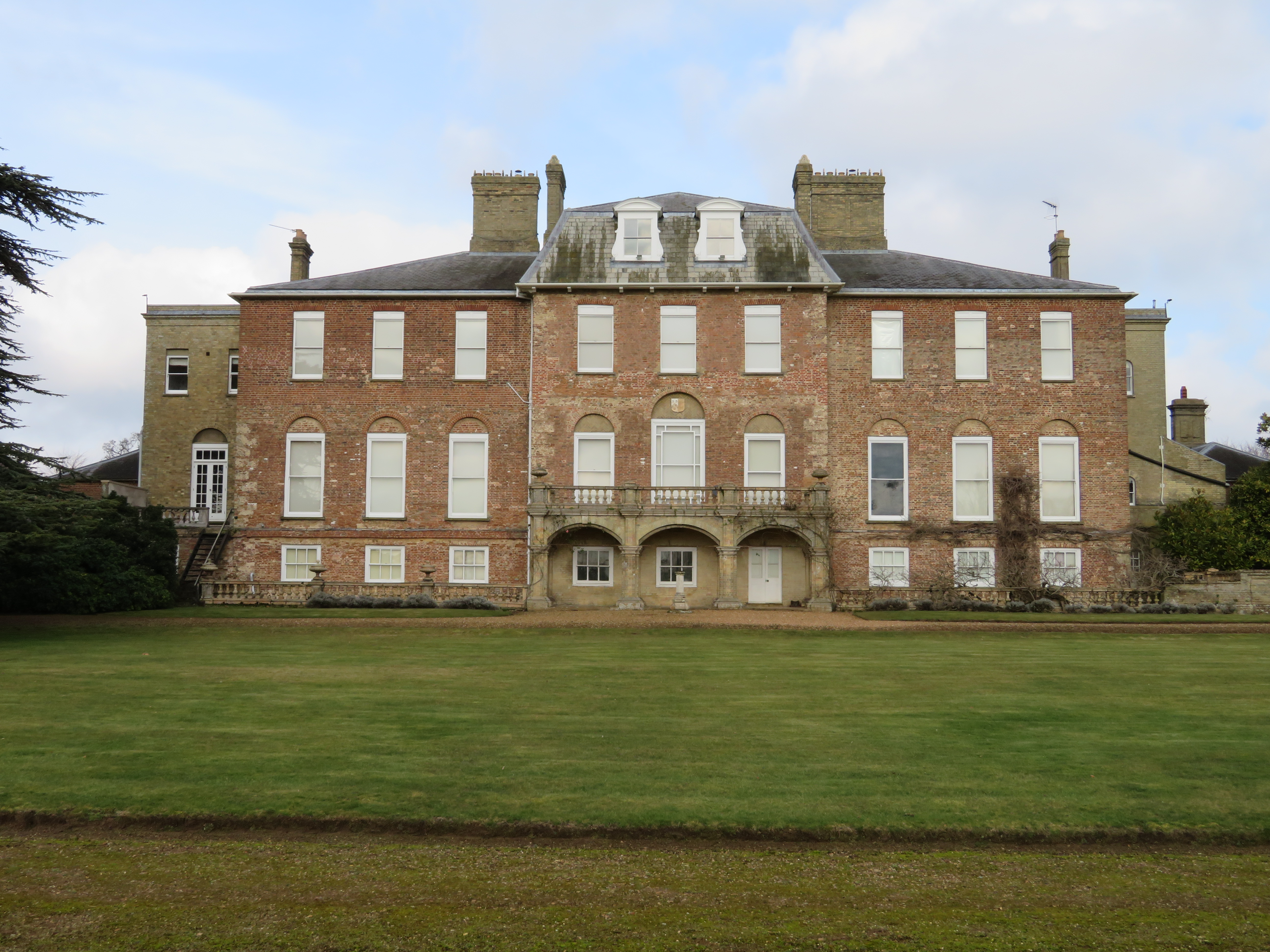
- The south, garden, front of the hall

- Location within Norfolk
- 52.5838°N 0.3978°E
- Type: House
- Location: Ryston, Norfolk

History
- Built: 1669–1672

Site notes
- Architect: Sir Roger Pratt
- Architectural style: Carolean
- Governing body: Privately owned

Listed Building – Grade II*
- Official name: Ryston Hall
- Designated: 9 July 1951
- Reference no.: 1205569

Listed Building – Grade II
- Official name: Stables to Ryston Hall
- Designated: 9 November 1984
- Reference no.: 1077856

Listed Building – Grade II
- Official name: Dairy in north-west corner of Ryston Hall stableyard
- Designated: 9 November 1984
- Reference no.: 1342311

Listed Building – Grade II
- Official name: Cowshed in north-west corner of Ryston Hall stableyard
- Designated: 9 November 1984
- Reference no.: 1205583

Listed Building – Grade II
- Official name: Summerhouse 40 metres east of Ryston Hall
- Designated: 9 November 1984
- Reference no.: 1280655

Ryston Hall, Ryston, Norfolk, England is a 17th-century country house built by Sir Roger Pratt for himself. The house was constructed between 1669 and 1672 in the Carolean style. In the late 18th century, John Soane made alterations to the house, and further work on the building was carried out by Anthony Salvin in the mid-19th century. Ryston Hall is a Grade II* listed building.

== History ==
The Pratts had owned land in the neighborhood of Ryston since the mid-16th century. Roger Pratt was born in 1620 and educated at Magdalen College, Oxford and at the Inner Temple, although he never practised law. In his youth he travelled extensively in Europe to avoid the English Civil War. His travelling influenced his subsequent career; he later offered advice to those unable to design their own houses; "[get] some ingenious gentleman who has seen much of that kind abroad and been somewhat versed in the best authors of Architecture; viz. Palladio, Scamozzi, Serlio etc. to do it for you". Another influence was Inigo Jones. Although in the tradition of the gentleman amateur, Pratt became "one of the most important post-Reformation architects in England". His output was small, John Summerson records only five houses in total, and little survives, but his Clarendon House was "the wonder of London" and Coleshill House, destroyed by fire and demolished in 1958, was described while it still stood as "the only unaltered example of [his] genius".

Ryston Hall was begun by Pratt in 1669, on his marriage and retirement. The house was complete by 1672. Pratt died at Ryston in 1684 and is buried in the village church which contains monuments to many of the Pratt family. His own is a simple black marble floor slab.

In 1787–1788, major re-modelling of the house was undertaken by Sir John Soane, which saw little but the shell of Pratt's original house remain. More limited reconstruction was carried out by Anthony Salvin for the Rev. Jermyn Pratt in 1864. Jill Allibone, Salvin's biographer, records that he did little more than add sculleries and bathrooms.

The hall remains in the possession of the Pratt family.

== Architecture and description ==
Pratt's house followed the double-pile plan he had first employed at Coleshill. The house is of nine bays, with a raised three-bay central section. Summerson describes it as of "rather a novel fashion, reflecting his French sympathies in a central high-roofed pavilion". Above the roofline Pratt included a clock tower with a bell-cot. The house was built of English bond brick. Nikolaus Pevsner, in his Buildings of England, notes that only "the shell remains", following Soane's remodelling. Soane raised the height of the two flanking wings, reordered the roofline and constructed a new porch on the north frontage of the house. Salvin's contribution was more modest; Allibone and Pevsner suggests it was limited to the addition of domestic offices and guest bedrooms, although Historic England ascribes the bays on the eastern and western sides of the house to him. Further remodelling of the roof, and the construction of a portico on the south, garden, front, was undertaken in the early 20th century.

The hall is a Grade II* listed building. The stables are listed Grade II, as are a dairy and a cowshed in the stable yard. A summerhouse in the grounds has its own Grade II listing.

== Sources ==
- Allibone, Jill (1988). Anthony Salvin: Pioneer of Gothic Revival Architecture. Cambridge: Lutterworth Press. ISBN 0-7188-2707-4.
- Aslet, Clive; Powers, Alan (1985). The National Trust Book of the English House. Harmondsworth, UK: Penguin Books. OCLC 904188923.
- Dutton, Ralph (1949). The English Country House. London: Batsford. OCLC 780874367.
- Gunther, Robert (1979) [1928]. The Architecture of Sir Roger Pratt. New York: Arno Press. ISBN 978-0-405-08862-9. OCLC 5188595.
- Pevsner, Nikolaus; Wilson, Bill (2002). Norfolk 2: North-west and South. The Buildings Of England. New Haven, US and London: Yale University Press. ISBN 978-0-300-09657-6. OCLC 1101266459.
- Sitwell, Sacheverell (1948). British Architects and Craftsmen. London: Batsford. OCLC 636508893.
- Summerson, John (1955). Architecture in Britain: 1530–1830. Pelican History of Art. London: Penguin Books. OCLC 915707152.
- Worsley, Giles (2007). Inigo Jones and the European Classicist Tradition. Newhaven, US & London: Yale University Press. ISBN 978-0-300-11729-5. OCLC 602542202.
