= Roger Pratt (architect) =

English gentleman and architect

Sir Roger Pratt
- Born: baptised 2 November 1620; Marsworth, Buckinghamshire
- Died: 20 February 1684; Ryston, Norfolk
- Occupation: Architect
- Buildings: Coleshill House; Kingston Lacy

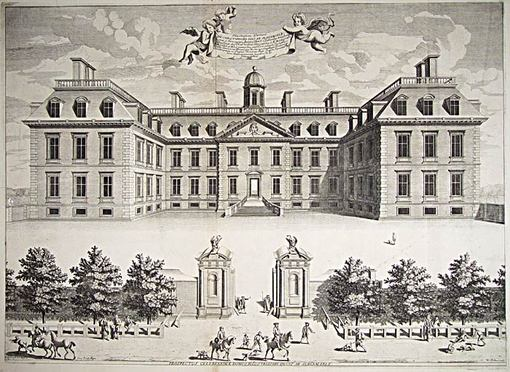
Clarendon House, London (1664–1667)

Sir Roger Pratt (1620 – 20 February 1684) was an English gentleman-architect of the 17th century. He designed only five known buildings, but was highly influential, establishing a particularly English type of house, which was widely imitated. He drew on a range of European influences, and also on the work of Inigo Jones, England's first classical architect. Pratt also served on official commissions, and in 1668 was the first English architect to be knighted for his services.

== Early life ==
Pratt was born to a landed Norfolk family, although he was baptised at Marsworth, Buckinghamshire, on 2 November 1620. He was educated at Magdalen College, Oxford, from 1637, and in 1639 was admitted to the Inner Temple, London. The following year he inherited his father's property in Ryston, Norfolk, but opted to leave the country to avoid the English Civil War, which broke out in 1642. Departing England in April 1643, he travelled in France, Italy, Flanders and Holland, studying architecture, and befriending the writer John Evelyn in Rome. Returning in 1649, after the execution of Charles I, Pratt returned to the Inner Temple, but continued the study of architecture.

== Houses ==
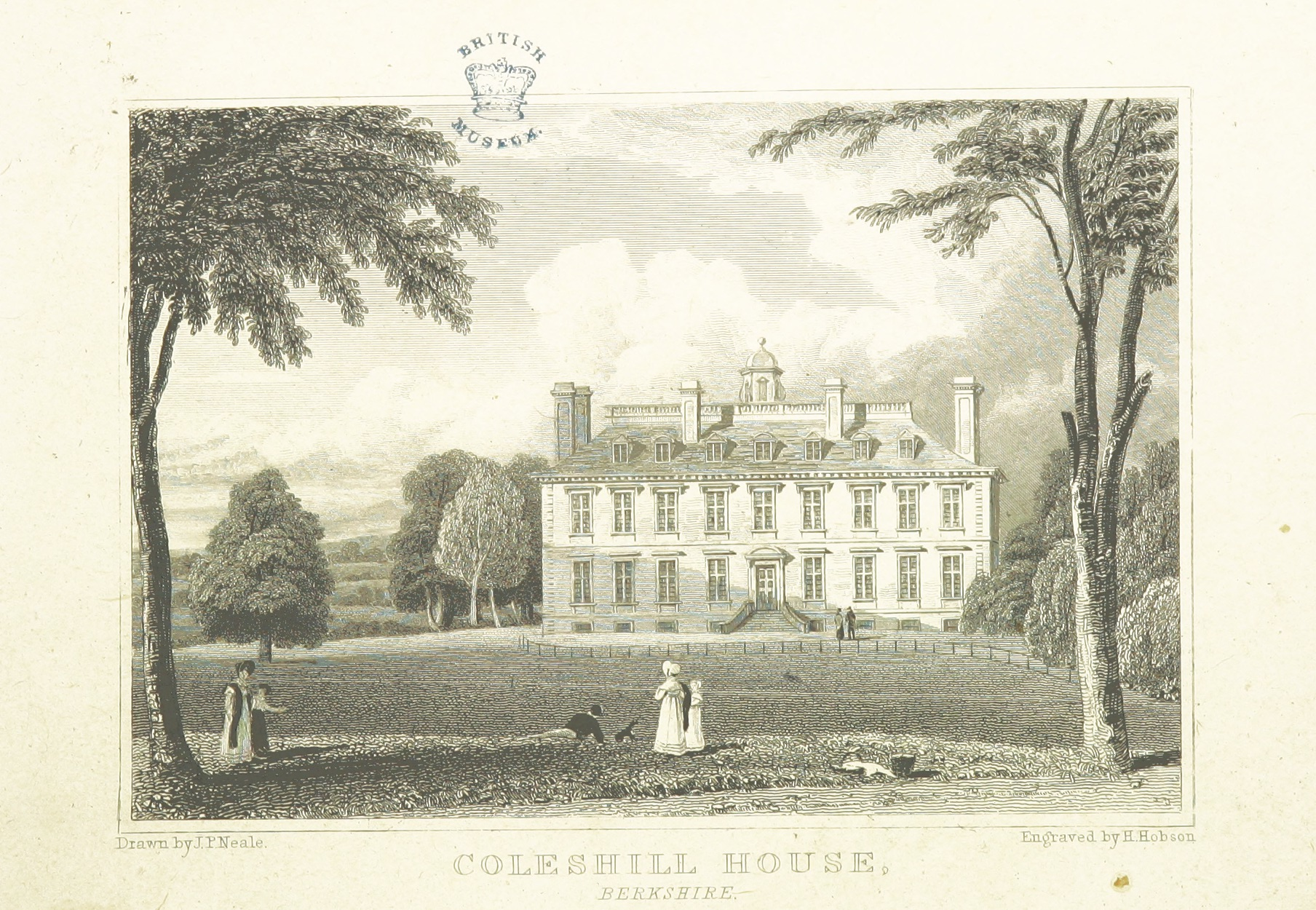
Coleshill House, Oxfordshire

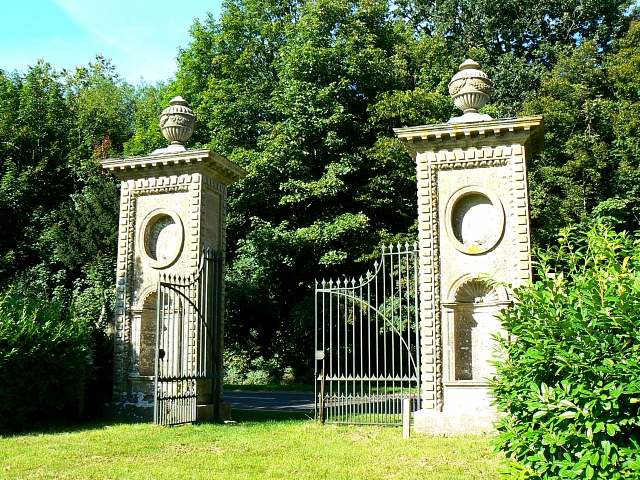
The gates are all that remain of Coleshill House, Oxfordshire

In the 1650s, Pratt became involved in the rebuilding of Coleshill House, Berkshire (c.1658–62; dem. 1952), the home of his cousin, Sir George Pratt. The house has been attributed to Inigo Jones, but although Jones is now primarily credited with the design, the execution was Pratt's.[4] The house is an example of the double-pile house, which was popular in seventeenth century England, and commended by Pratt since ‘it seems of all others to be the most useful … for that we have there much room in a little compass … and there may be a great spare of walling’ (Gunther, p. 24).

Although a less effective example of the planning and the organization of circulation that Pratt was so interested in, the grand two-story staircase and the use of central corridors on each floor meant that suites of apartments could be separated and prevented private rooms having to act as passageways through the house. Most probably inspired by his travels, the house is a mix of Italian, French, Dutch and English architectural ideas and includes features such as the rooftop platform and cupola, dormered attics, half-sunk basement, astylar elevation, and symmetrically placed apartments. Palladian details are evident in the windows and cornices, and the "double-pile" plan is derived from Jones' Queen's House in Greenwich (1614–1617). The prominent chimneys and dormers, and the rusticated basement, are more French in inspiration, while the equal proportions of the storeys were an innovation, compared to the Palladian manner of emphasising a piano nobile, or principal floor.

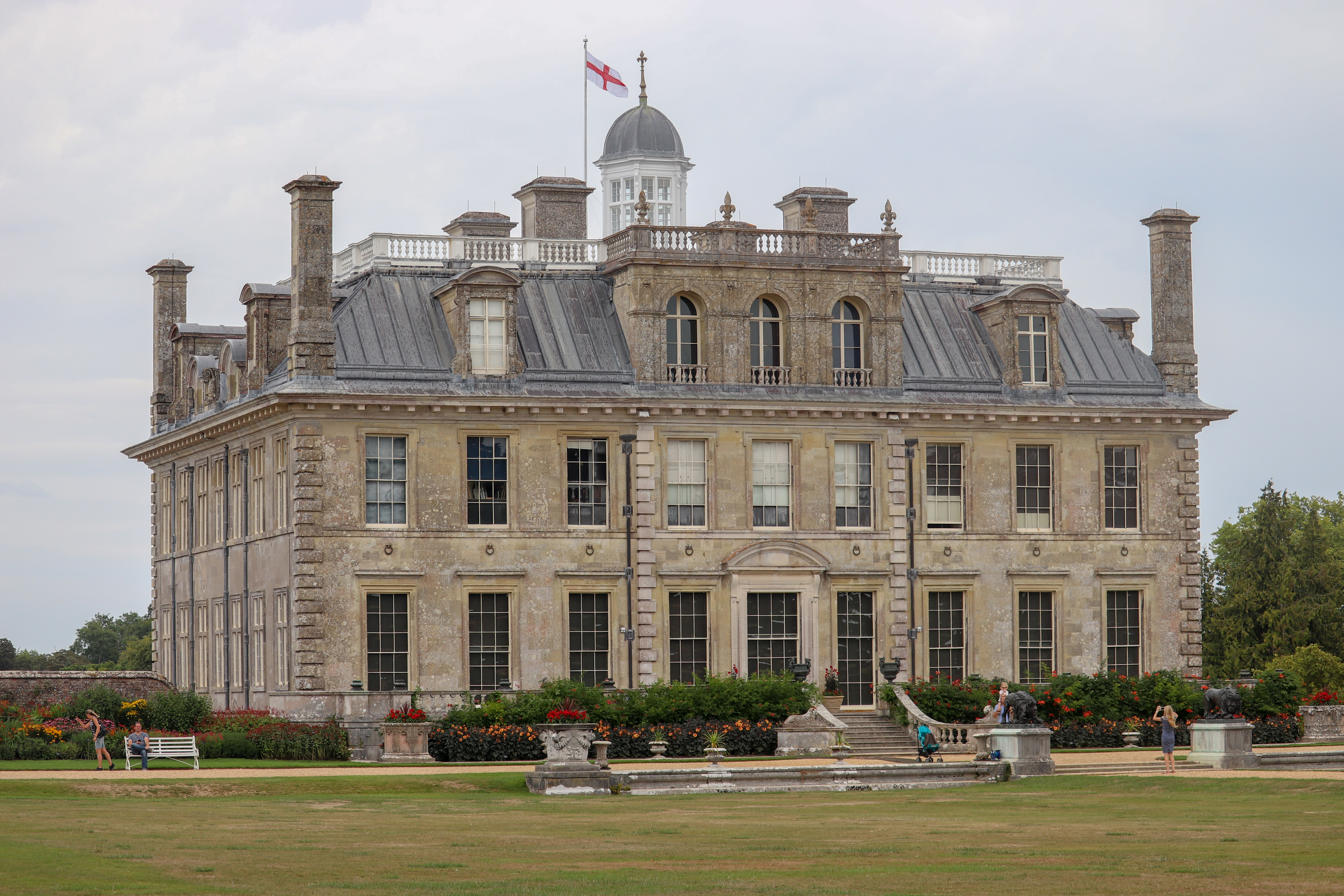
The south and west sides of Kingston Lacy, as remodelled by Sir Charles Barry in the 19th century

Between 1663 and 1665, Pratt was engaged on houses for Sir Ralph Bankes, at Kingston Lacy, Dorset (1663–5; altered 1835–41), and for William Alington, 3rd Baron Alington, at Horseheath Hall, Cambridgeshire (1663–5; dem. 1792).

Refining his ideas and correcting the problem Coleshill’s corridors caused with accidental contact between family, visitors and servants, a complication addressed by many seventeenth century architects, Pratt adapted his plans. Both Kingston Lacy and Horseheath Hall had tripartite plans with a central two-storey hall. At each end Pratt introduced large stair compartments, with independent apartments at the angles. At Horseheath, Pratt added a pediment to the front. The house was illustrated in Colen Campbell's architectural survey, Vitruvius Britannicus, although it was attributed to John Webb. The eleven-bay house had a three-bay pediment, rusticated quoins, and a hipped roof topped by a balustrade and lantern.

Pratt's most influential building was Clarendon House, constructed between 1664 and 1667 for the Lord Chancellor, Edward Hyde, 1st Earl of Clarendon. Located on Piccadilly in the City of Westminster, the house was short-lived, and records are limited. Engravings show a pedimented house similar to Horseheath, but with short wings at each end. Clarendon represented the most developed form of Pratt's ideal, and was "among the first great classical houses to be built in London". It was widely praised, and became widely imitated, for example at Belton House. In 1669, Pratt rebuilt his own home, Ryston Hall, Norfolk, in a French-influenced style.

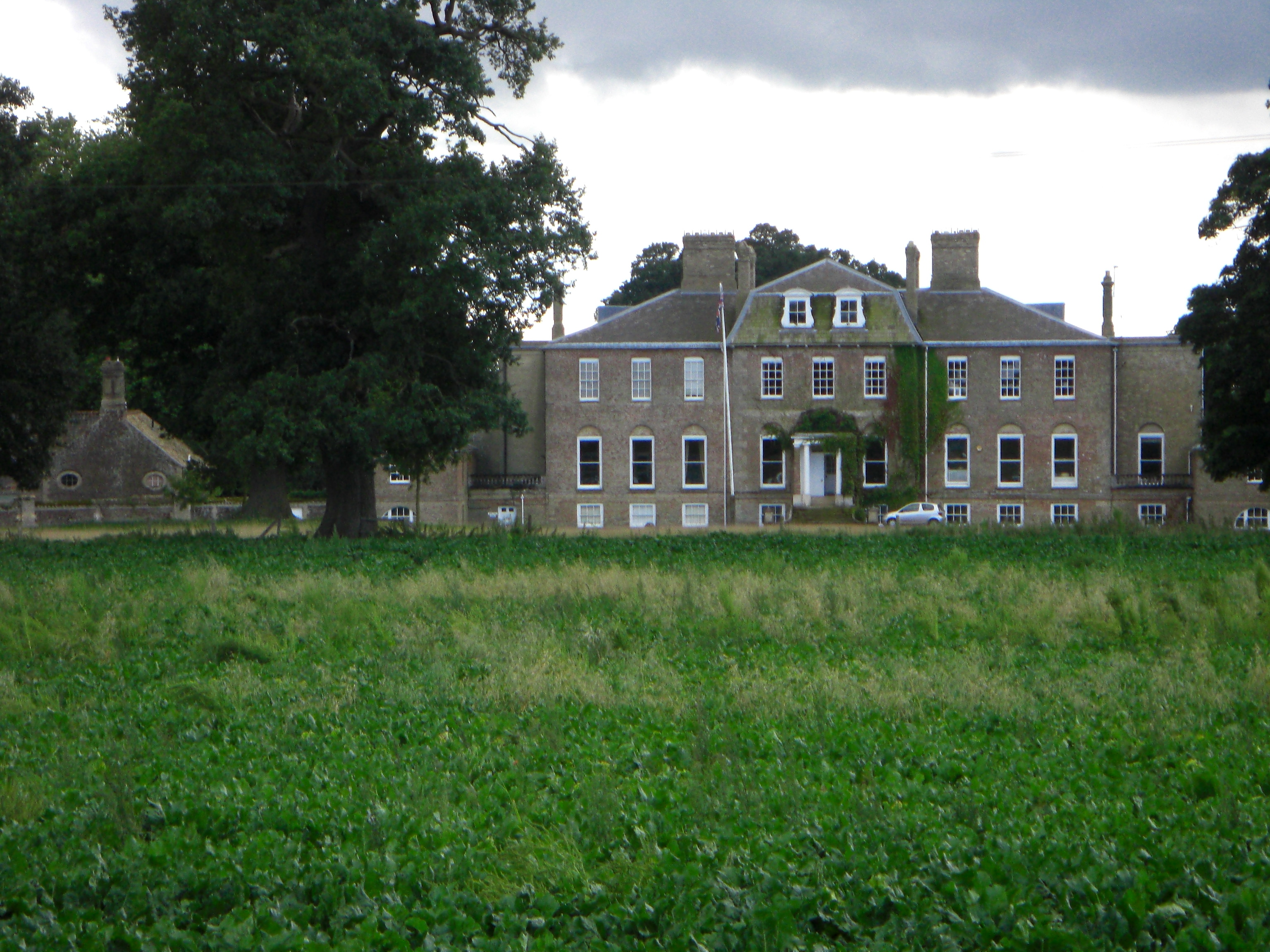
Ryston Hall, Norfolk

Little of Pratt's work remains intact. Clarendon House was sold in 1675, and demolished in 1683, only 16 years after its completion. Horseheath was pulled down in 1777, and Coleshill burned down in 1952. Kingston Lacy was altered by Sir Charles Barry in the 1830s, and Ryston Hall was remodelled by Sir John Soane.

== Official works ==
In 1663, a commission was formed to oversee the restoration of the crumbling Old St Paul's Cathedral in London. The commission obtained a report from Pratt, which recommended leaving the structure to fall down of its own accord. At a meeting in late August 1666, the commission opted instead for Christopher Wren's proposals for rebuilding.

A week later, the Great Fire of London broke out, destroying much of central London, including Old St Paul's. In September, Pratt was one of the three "Commissioners for Rebuilding the City of London", appointed by Charles II. The others were Wren and Hugh May. Along with three representatives of the City of London (Robert Hooke, Edward Jerman and Peter Mills), they were charged with surveying the damage, and promoting methods of rebuilding. The commissioners' work led to two acts of Parliament for rebuilding, the Rebuilding of London Act 1666 and the Rebuilding of London Act 1670, although, unlike Wren, Pratt played no further role in the reconstruction work.

On 16 July 1668, Roger Pratt was knighted by Charles II, becoming the first English architect to be so honoured.

== Later life ==
Following his knighthood, and his marriage the same year to Ann Monins, daughter of Sir Edward Monins, Bt., Pratt opted to retire to his family property in Norfolk. The rebuilding of Ryston Hall was his last work, and he afterwards concentrated on agricultural improvement. He died in 1684, having been predeceased by his three sons, and was buried in the church at Ryston.
