= Fred A. Petersen =

American architect

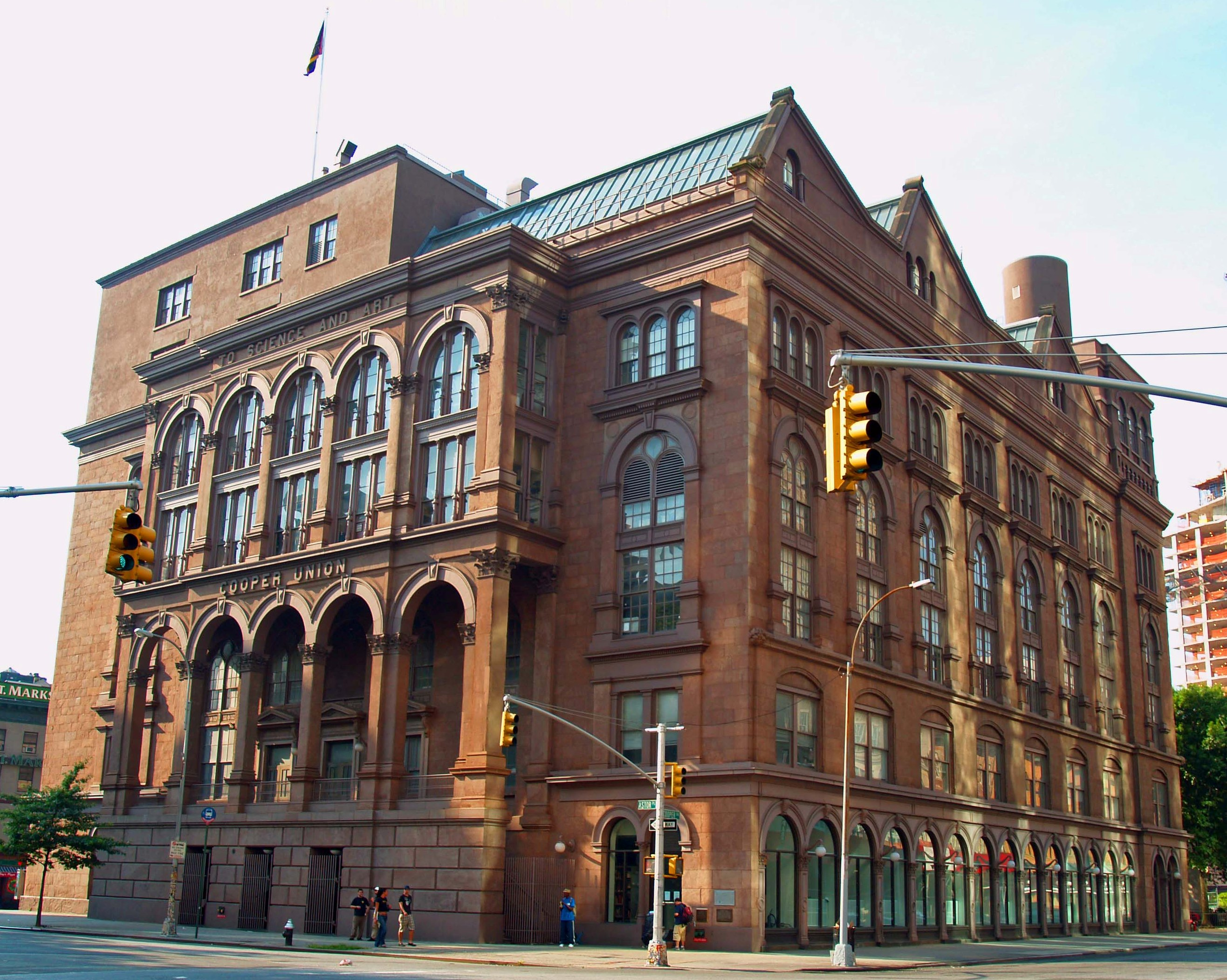
Cooper Union

Fred A. Petersen (1808–1885) was an American architect. He was one of the original 13 founders of the American Institute of Architects. He was born in Prussia. He was a political refugee having escaped from imprisonment for his involvement in the German Revolution of 1848. In 1855 he patented the first fireproof hollow brick tile for Cooper Union, a building he designed. He died in Orange, New Jersey.
