= Alexander Nevsky Memorial Church =

Church in Potsdam, Germany

- Alexander-Newski-Gedächtniskirche
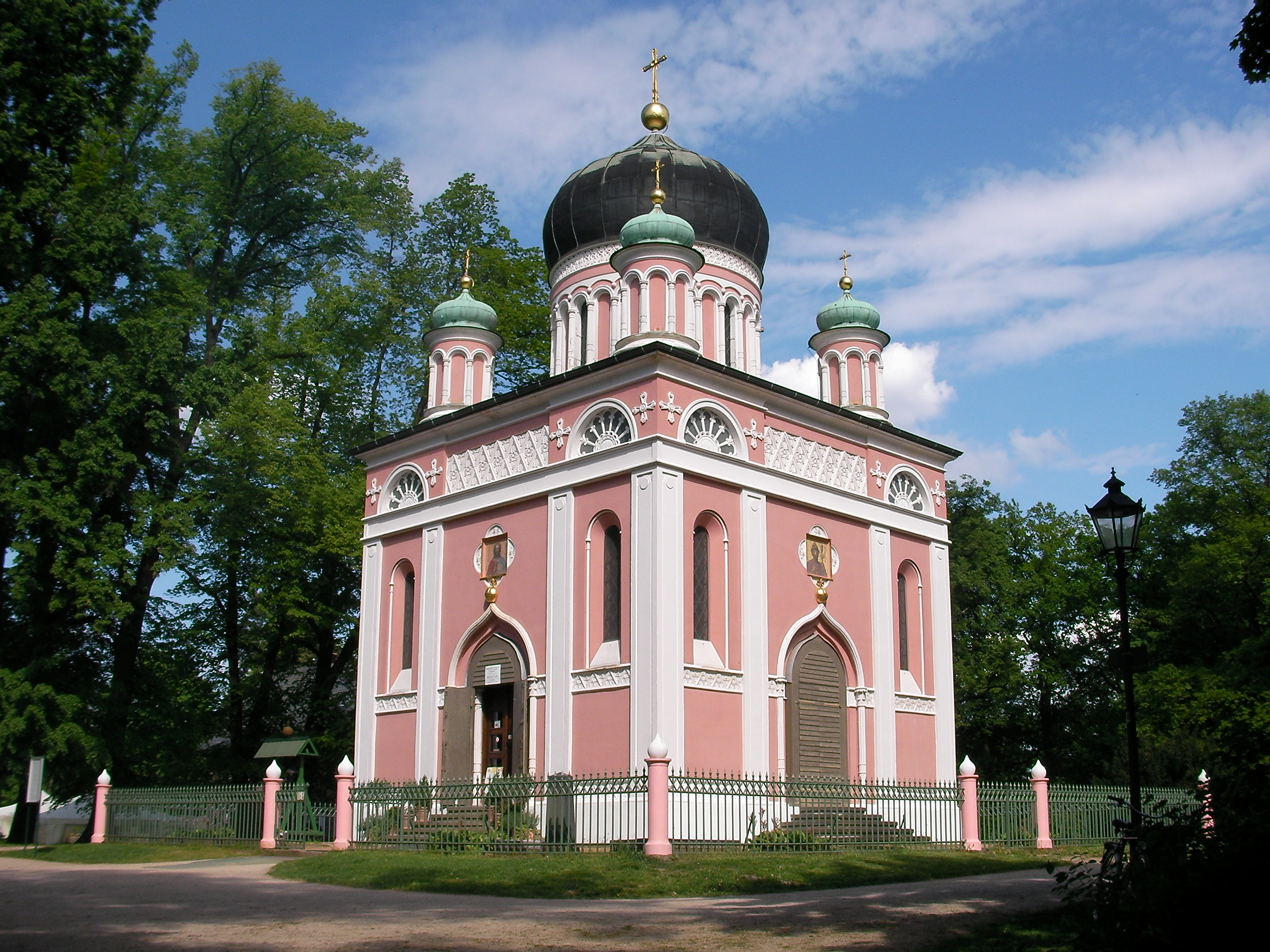

Religion
- Affiliation: Russian Orthodox Church
- Year consecrated: 1829

Location
- Location: Potsdam, Germany
- Interactive map of Alexander Nevsky Memorial Church
- Coordinates: 52°24′55″N 13°03′28″E

Architecture
- Architect: Vasily Stasov
- Type: Church
- Style: Byzantine Revival
- Groundbreaking: 1826
- Completed: 1829

The Alexander Nevsky Memorial Church is a historic Russian Orthodox church building in Potsdam, Germany.

The church dates back to the 19th century, making it the oldest Russian Orthodox church in the country. The church was built in 1826–1829 at the edge of Alexandrowka settlement.

The church was built for the Russian residents of the settlement of Alexandrowka, now part of the UNESCO World Heritage Site "Palaces and Parks of Potsdam and Berlin", below the Kapellenberg. Consecrated in 1829, it remains an active congregation and is the oldest Russian Orthodox church in Germany. Designed by Vasily Stasov, Nevsky Church is a very early example of the Byzantine Revival architecture in Germany, and one of the earliest examples of Byzantine Revival in Russian Revival architecture.
