= 1743 in architecture =

== Buildings and structures ==
=== Buildings ===
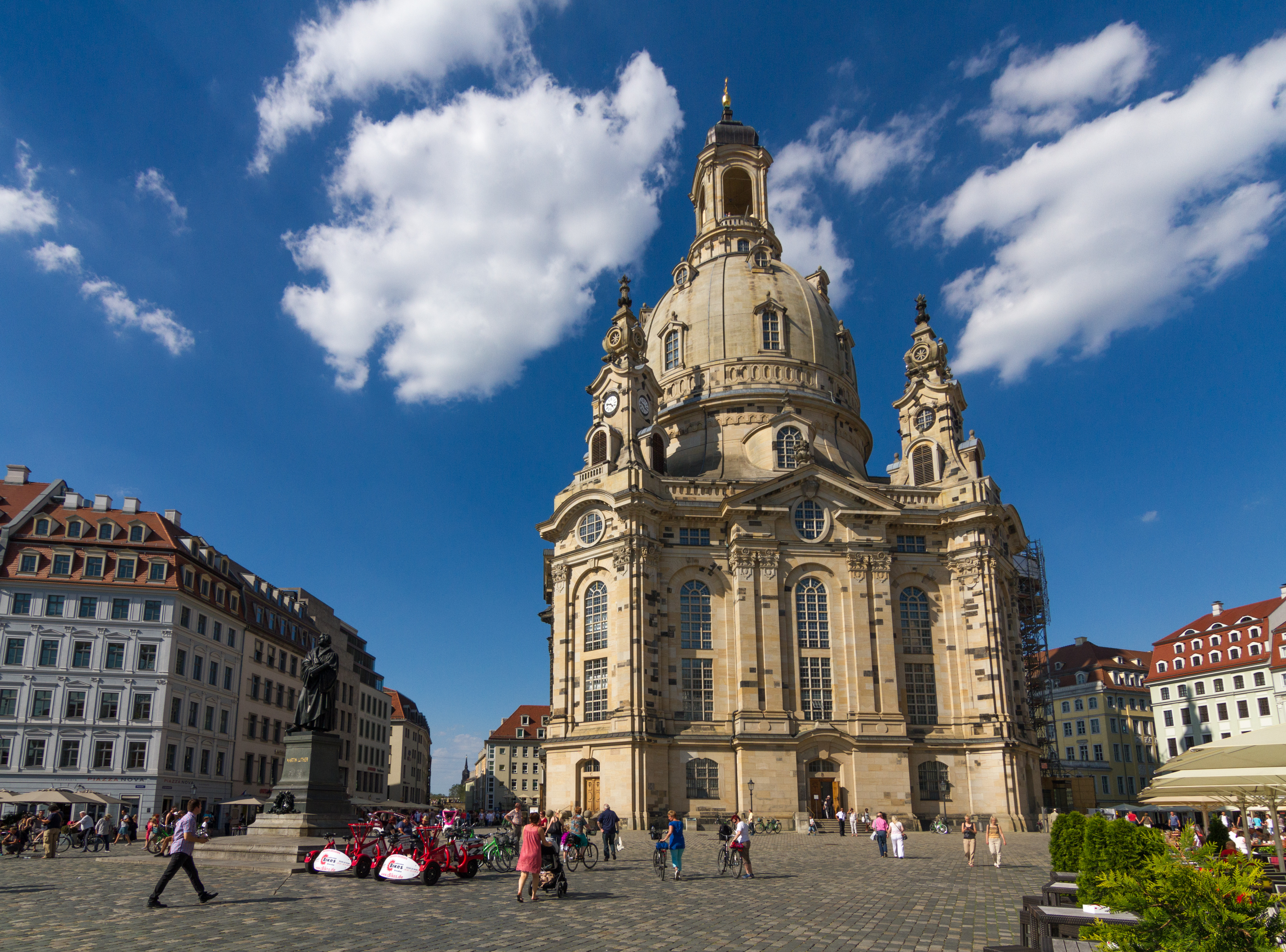
The Dresden Frauenkirche, in Germany

- Construction begins on the Basilica of the Vierzehnheiligen, in Bavaria, designed by Johann Balthasar Neumann.
- Dresden Frauenkirche, in Dresden, Germany, designed by George Bähr, is completed.
- Eltzer Hof in Mainz completed
- September 29 – Church of the Gesuati on the Giudecca canal in Venice, designed by Giorgio Massari in 1724, is consecrated.

== Births ==
- April 13 – Thomas Jefferson, American President and amateur architect (died 1826)

== Deaths ==
- May 22 – Thomas Archer, English Baroque architect (born 1668)
