= Clarendon House =

Mansion formerly in London

Coordinates: 51°30′31″N 0°8′30″W

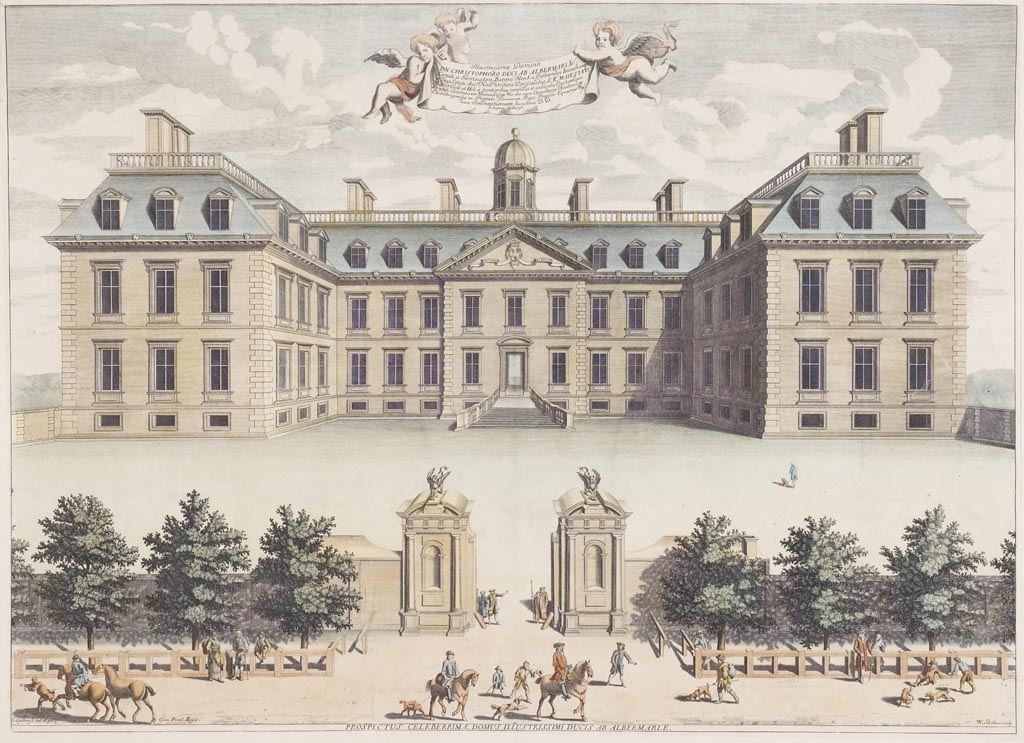
Clarendon House, circa 1680, when owned by the Duke of Albemarle. Engraving by William Skillman (fl.1660-1685) from a painting by Johann Spilberg II (1619-1690)

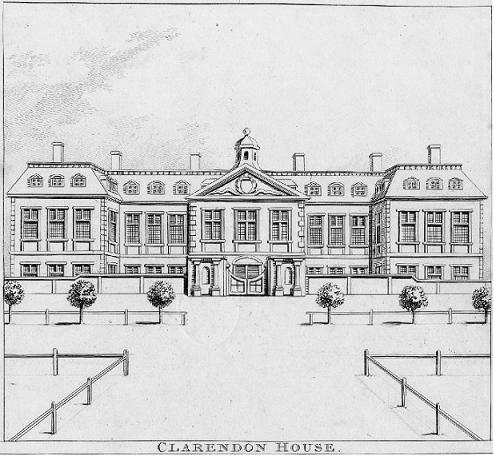
Clarendon House, viewed from St James's Street. 1798 engraving by Nathaniel Smith and John Thomas Smith of London, copied from an earlier print in the collection of Thomas Allen Esq. Published in Smith's "Antiquities of London" in 1798

Clarendon House was a town mansion which stood on Piccadilly in London, England, from the 1660s to the 1680s. It was built for the powerful politician Edward Hyde, 1st Earl of Clarendon, and was the grandest private London residence of its era.

== History ==
After the restoration of the English monarchy in 1660, new houses began to spring up in the West End to accommodate Charles II's courtiers. Piccadilly was little more than a country lane, but the land to the north of it was just beginning to be used for housing; the next several decades would see the development of the whole of this area, which was to become London's leading aristocratic residential district, Mayfair. Two other celebrated mansions were built close to Hyde's at around the same time. To the east Sir John Denham was building the house that later became Burlington House, and to the west Lord Berkeley was building Berkeley House, later Devonshire House.

Lord Clarendon acquired the 8-acre (3.2 ha) site for his house by royal grant in 1664. Ironically in view of later events he always maintained that he had been reluctant to build such an ostentatious house, but was unable to rent any suitable mansion. Clarendon House was built between that year and 1667 to designs by Roger Pratt. It was set well back from the street behind a courtyard. The central section had nine bays and the two side wings were each three bays wide. The house was built on the double pile plan, meaning that it was two rooms deep, and had two main storeys of roughly equal height. There was a raised basement below and a tall attic storey with dormer windows above. The roof was flat and balustraded and topped with a cupola. The style was typical of the English fashion of the day, clearly influenced by classical principles, symmetrical and pedimented, but lacking any classical orders. Little is known about the interior layout beyond what can be surmised from the exterior, from Pratt's other works, and from the conventions of the time. It probably had a large top lit central staircase hall and a series of state apartments. It had 101 hearths.

Clarendon House was praised both by contemporaries and by later architectural critics. John Evelyn thought it was "the best contriv'd, the most useful, graceful and magnificent house in England". Three hundred years later, John Summerson wrote: "Clarendon House was among the first great classical houses to be built in London and easily the most striking of them." It was to prove an influential model for future English houses, but its impact was felt much more in the design of country houses than London mansions. Belton House in Lincolnshire, which is sometimes said to be the exemplar of the English country house, was closely based on Clarendon House.

In 1667, the same year that his house was finished, Clarendon fell from favour. His image had not been helped by the grandeur of his mansion, which is believed to have cost around £40,000. Among the many allegations against him it was charged that he had appropriated, to build his house, stone intended for repairs to St. Paul's Cathedral after the Great Fire of London. That same year, on 14 June 1667, Samuel Pepys recorded in his diary: "...some rude people have been... at my Lord Clarendon's where they cut down the trees before his house and broke his windows." In response to the allegations, the King abandoned his former favourite. In 1667, Clarendon fled to France, where he died in 1674.

In 1675, his heirs sold Clarendon House to Christopher Monck, 2nd Duke of Albemarle, for £26,000, and in 1683, Albemarle resold it to a consortium of investors led by Sir Thomas Bond. Bond demolished it and built Dover Street, Albemarle Street, and Bond Street on the site. Albemarle Street ran right through the centre of the site of the house, which had faced directly down St. James's Street.

The building of the house and the resentment it caused are major elements in The Piccadilly Plot, the seventh of the Thomas Chaloner series of mystery novels by Susanna Gregory.
