= Ulmus 'Concavaefolia' =

Ulmus 'Concavaefolia' may refer to:

- Ulmus glabra 'Concavaefolia'
- Ulmus minor 'Concavaefolia'
