= Ulmus 'Crispa' =

Elm cultivar

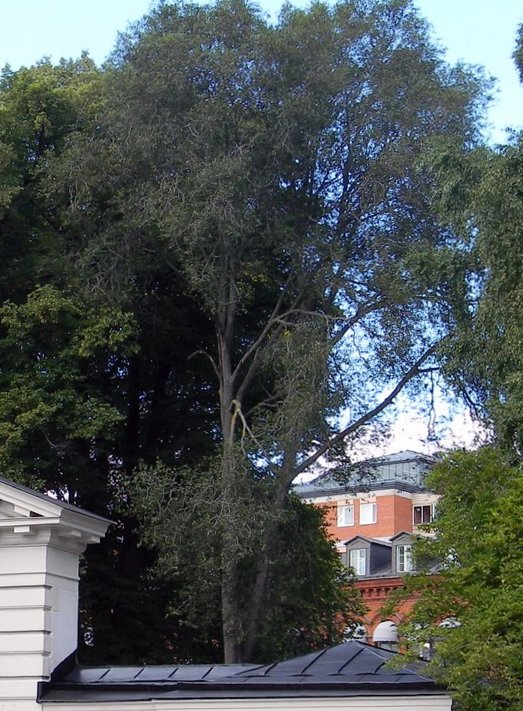
- 'Crispa', Serafimerparken, Stockholm, 2011
- Genus: Ulmus
- Cultivar: 'Crispa'
- Origin: Europe

The elm cultivar Ulmus 'Crispa' [:'curled', the leaf margin], sometimes known as the Fernleaf Elm, arose before 1800 and was first listed by Willdenow as U. crispa (1809). Audibert listed a U. campestris Linn. 'Crispa', orme à feuilles crépues [:'frizzy-leaved elm'], in 1817, and an Ulmus urticaefolia [:'nettle-leaved elm'] in 1832; the latter is usually taken to be a synonym. Loudon considered the tree a variety of U. montana (1838). In the 19th century, Ulmus × hollandica cultivars, as well as those of Wych Elm, were often grouped under Ulmus montana. Elwes and Henry (1913) listed 'Crispa' as a form of wych elm, but made no mention of the non-wych samara (see 'Description').

Hanham (1857) noted that in his day concave-leaved field elm, U. campestris concavaefolia, was frequently mistaken for and sold as 'Crispa' in nurseries, "though there is a wide difference between them". The Louis van Houtte nursery used the synonym Ulmus campestris adiantifolia for 'Crispa', and Ulmus campestris crispa for the cultivar 'Webbiana'. The Baudriller nursery of Angers went one step further, listing Ulmus campestris adiantifolia, orme à feuilles de capillaire [:'downy-leaved elm'], separately from both Ulmus campestris crispa, orme à feuilles crispées [:'wrinkled-leaved elm'] and Ulmus campestris webbiana, orme de Webb.

Koch, noting similarities between 'Crispa' and Ulmus montana rugosa, conjectured (1872) that the latter cultivar, which has "similar but less frizzy leaves", may have arisen from the former.

== Description ==
'Crispa' is a slow-growing tree with pendulous branches bearing narrow, linear to oblanceolate leaves up to 9 cm long by 3.5 cm broad, distinctively wrinkled and with numerous incised curved teeth. Hanham (1857), concurring with Loudon (1838), described it as "generally of a slender and stunted habit of growth", and Henry (1913) as a small tree; mature specimens in Sweden, however, have attained a height comparable to the type. The seed is near the apex (margin) of the samara, confirmed from specimens in The Netherlands – a diagnostic feature which points to hybridity. The petiole is variable – short on thick twigs, but longer and unwyly-like on more slender twigs. Arnold Arboretum, Massachusetts, described their specimen of 'Crispa' (1915) as "more curious than beautiful".

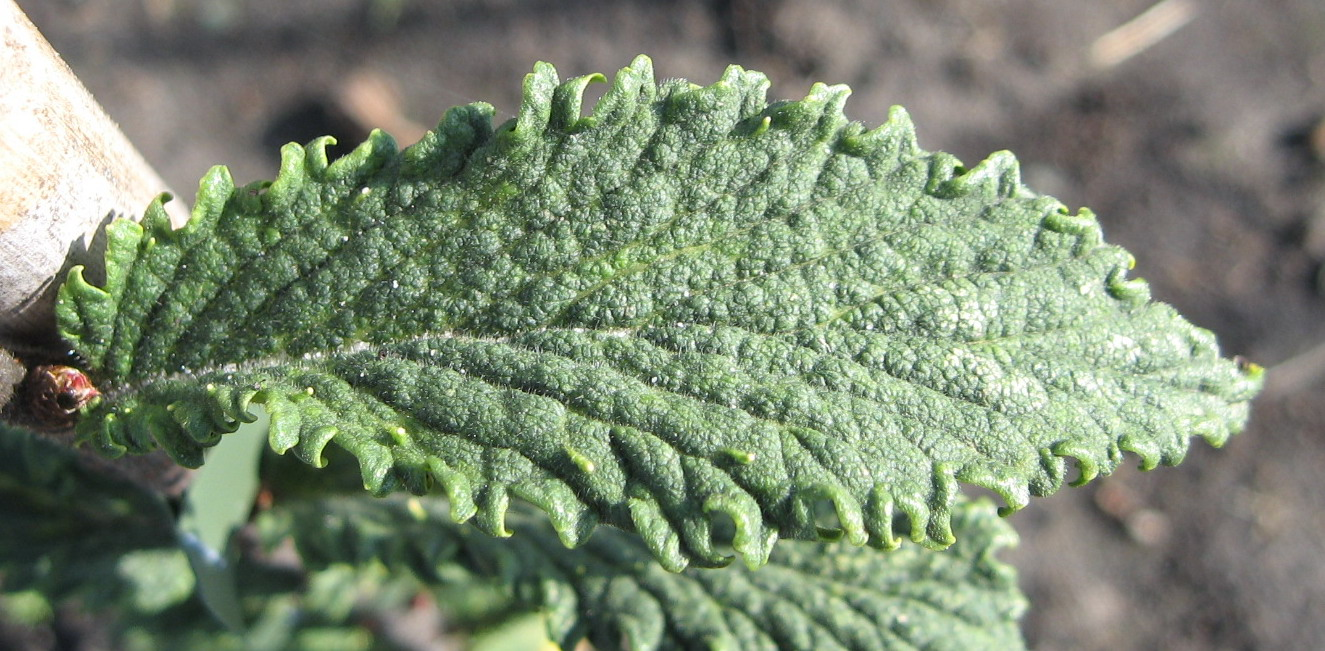
'Crispa' leaf

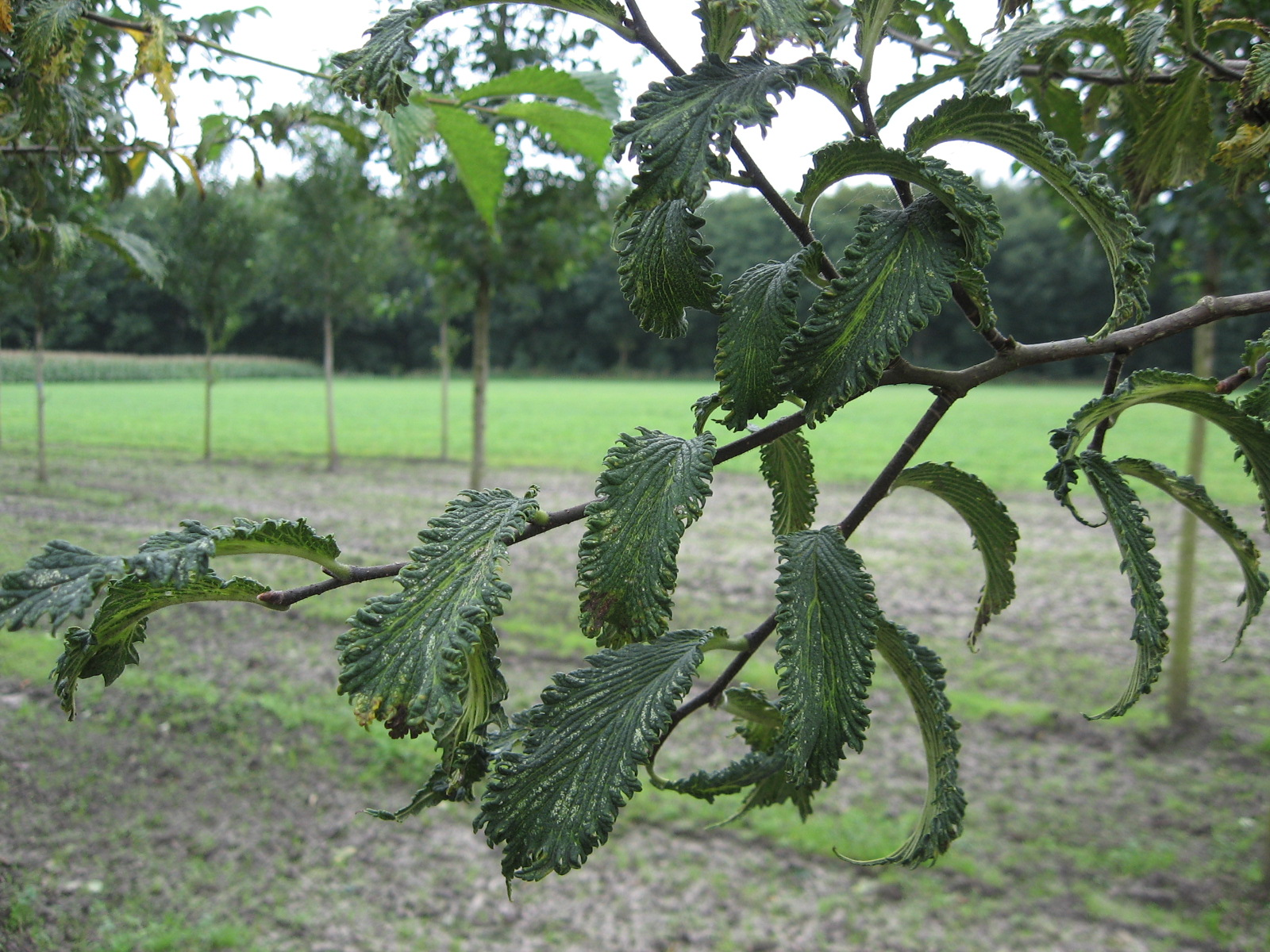
Leaves of 'Crispa'

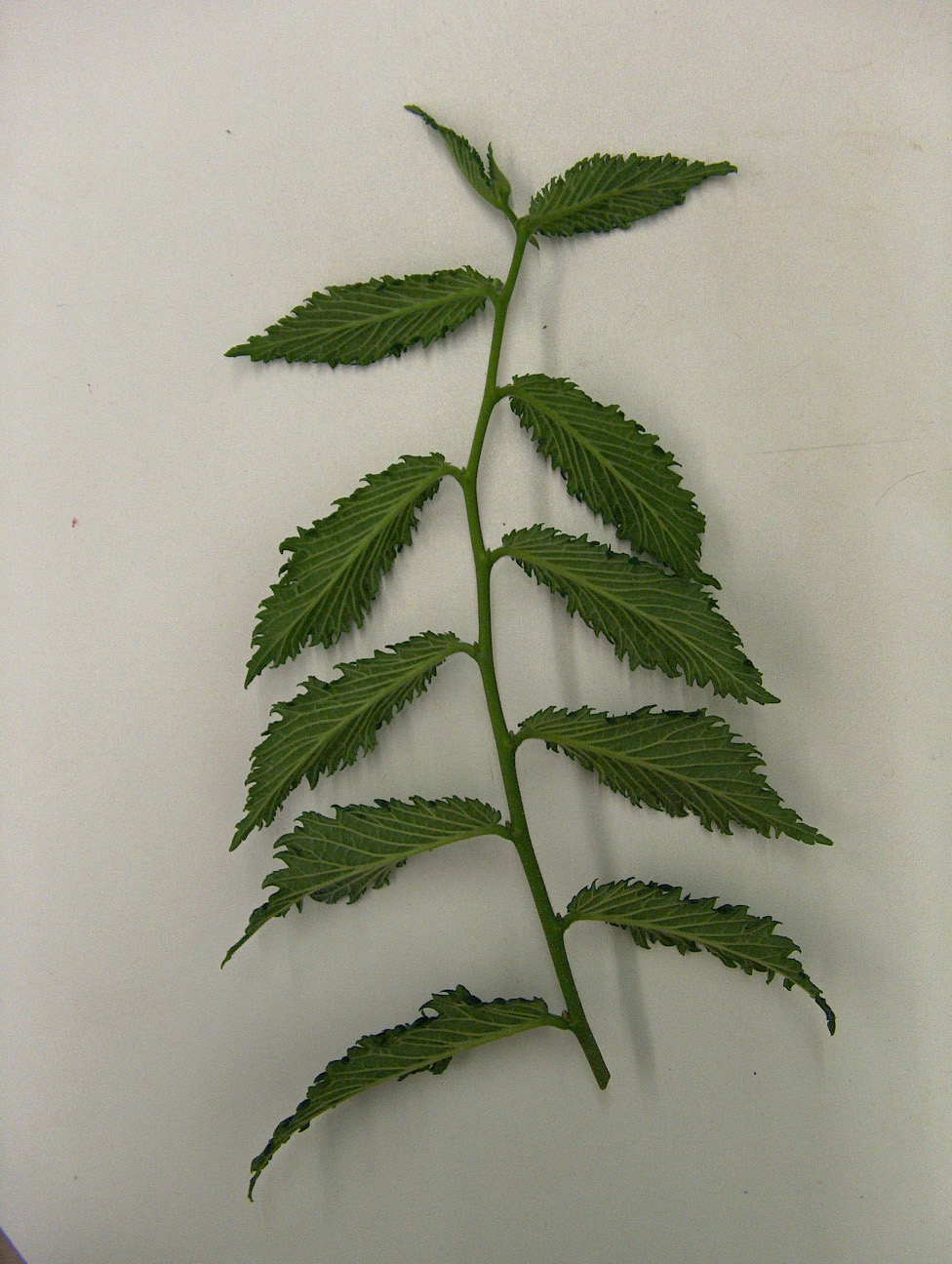
Underside of 'Crispa' leaves

== Pests and diseases ==
'Crispa' is susceptible to Dutch elm disease.

== Cultivation ==
'Crispa' was once to be found in collections in Britain, including Kew, the Royal Botanic Garden Edinburgh, and the Royal Victoria Park, Bath. A specimen obtained from Späth as U. montana crispa and planted in 1916, stood in the Ryston Hall arboretum, Norfolk, in the early 20th century. The tree was propagated and marketed in the UK by the Hillier & Sons nursery, Winchester, Hampshire, from 1945, with just 12 sold in the period 1962 to 1977, when production ceased. Only one mature tree is now known to survive in the UK, at the Rosemoor Garden in Devon.

Specimens survive in Sweden (see 'Notable trees') and Latvia. As 'Crispa' was marketed in Poland in the 19th century by the Ulrich nursery, Warsaw, and by the Späth nursery of Berlin, other specimens may survive elsewhere in Eastern Europe. The Hesse Nursery of Weener, Germany, distributed the tree as U. campestris urticifolia Hort. in the 1930s. The tree remains in cultivation in Europe (see 'Nurseries').

The tree was introduced to the Dominion Arboretum, Ottawa, Canada in 1896 as U. montana crispa (syn. U. campestris urticaefolia). Ulmus crispa was distributed by Hovey's nursery of Boston, Massachusetts from the 1850s. 'Crispa' appeared as U. urticifolia, 'Nettle-leaved elm' with "undulating leaves", in Kelsey's 1904 catalogue, New York. It was listed by nurseries in Australia in the early 20th century, but there are no records of any survivors there.

== Notable trees ==
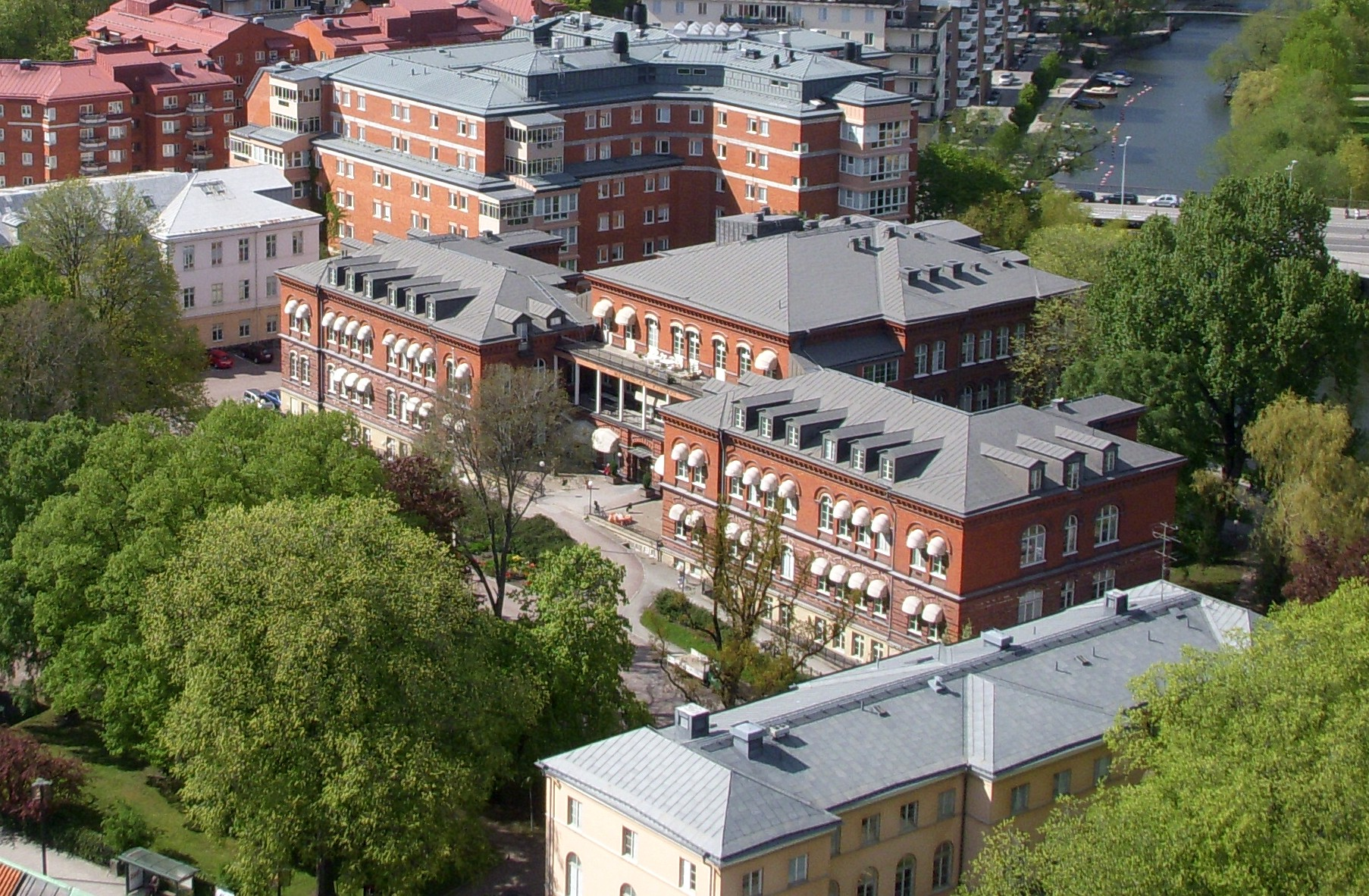
'Crispa' (left of centre, not yet in full leaf) in Serafimerparken, Stockholm, 2009

Large specimens survive in Sweden, in Krusenburg near Uppsala, and Stockholm (Hantverkargatan and two in Serafimerparken) (2017).

== Varieties ==
- 'Crispa Aurea'
- 'Crispa Pendula'

== Synonymy ==
- Ulmus urticaefolia: Audibert 1832 catalogue.
- Ulmus adiantifolia Hort.: Kirchner, in Petzold & Kirchner, Arboretum Muscaviense, 565, 1864. Name in synonymy.
- Ulmus campestris adiantifolia ?: Baudriller 1880 catalogue, Louis van Houtte 1881 catalogue.
- Ulmus campestris var. sublaciniatus: Mathieu, Flore générale de Belgique 1: 480, 1853..
- Ulmus montana filicifolia ?: Smith & Co., Worcester, 1887–88, Thompson & Watson: a wych elm cultivar with "dissected foliage"
- Ulmus campestris filicifolia ? :Louis van Houtte 1881 catalogue
- Ulmus asplenifolia: Bean (1936)

== Accessions ==
Europe

- Grange Farm Arboretum, Lincolnshire, UK. Acc. no. 1069.
- Hortus Botanicus Nationalis, Salaspils, Latvia. Acc. no. 18101
- Linnaean Gardens of Uppsala, Sweden. Acc. no. 1996-1558
- Rosemoor Garden, Torrington, Devon, UK. One tree, in Lady Anne's Garden, planted in 1976, 8 m high (2008) ; obtained from the D M van Gelderen nursery, Boskoop, Netherlands.
- Tallinn Botanic Garden, Estonia . No details available.
- Netherlands Plant Collection Ulmus, Wijdemeren, 3 planted as Ulmus glabra ‘Crispa’ 2021 Rading Loosdrecht and De Kwakel Kortenhoef obtained from Chris van der Wurff nursery, Netherlands.

== Nurseries ==
- Arboretum Waasland, Nieuwkerken-Waas, Belgium.
- Centrum voor Botanische Verrijking vzw, Kampenhout, Belgium.
- Lønbæk Planteskole , Holstebro, Denmark.
- Kwekerij Arborealis , Wilhelminaoord, Netherlands.
- Szkółki Konieczko , Gogolin, Poland.
