= Ulmus minor 'Cucullata' =

Elm cultivar

- Species: Ulmus minor
- Cultivar: 'Cucullata'
- Origin: England

The Field Elm cultivar Ulmus minor 'Cucullata', the Hooded elm, was listed by Loddiges of Hackney, London, in their catalogue of 1823 as Ulmus campestris cucullata, and later by Loudon in Arboretum et Fruticetum Britannicum (1838), as U. campestris var. cucullata.

Hooded-leaved field elm is not to be confused with U. campestris L. cucullata (= Ulmus montana cucullata Hort), the curled-leaved wych elm cultivar 'Concavaefolia'.

== Description ==
Loudon described Ulmus campestris var. cucullata as having "leaves curiously curved, something like a hood". He thought the tree resembled an undescribed cultivar he called var. concavaefolia. This brief description was dismissed by Elwes and Henry (1913) as "insufficient" for distinguishing concave- and hooded-leaved elms. They ignored Loudon's var. cucullata and expressed the view that his var. concavaefolia was identical to the cultivar 'Webbiana'.

== Pests and diseases ==
See under field elm.

== Cultivation ==
If Loudon's Ulmus campestris var. cucullata was the tree later cultivated as Ulmus montana cucullata Hort, as Petzold and Kirchner believed (Arboretum Muscaviense, 1864), it is now very rare in cultivation. The Späth nursery of Berlin supplied one U. campestris cucullata to the Dominion Arboretum, Ottawa, Canada (planted 1897), three to the Royal Botanic Garden Edinburgh in 1902, and one to the Ryston Hall arboretum, Norfolk (planted 1916). Späth's tree may have been the Arboretum Muscaviense Ulmus campestris var. cucullata, now identified as the wych cultivar 'Concavaefolia', which fits his description of curled grey leaves.

Field elms with 'hooded' convex leaves, however, are not unknown in cultivation, one clone being present in Brighton and Edinburgh (see below). They are not known to have been introduced to Australasia.

=== Hooded-leaved field elms in the UK ===
A pruned field elm clone with rather elongated convex ('hooded') leaves, stands in Victoria Park, Portslade, East Sussex.

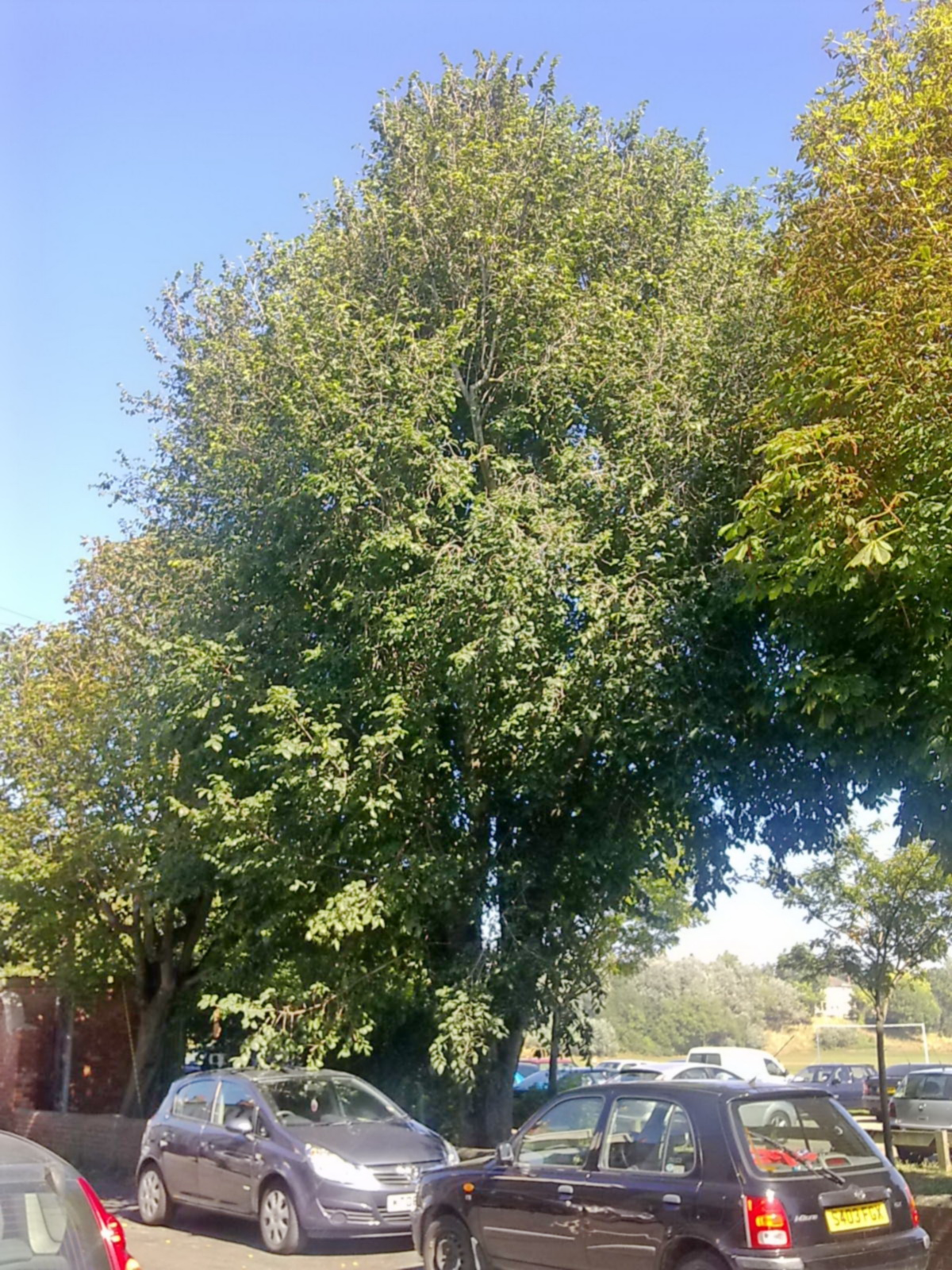
Pruned convex-leaved field elm, Portslade, East Sussex (2003)

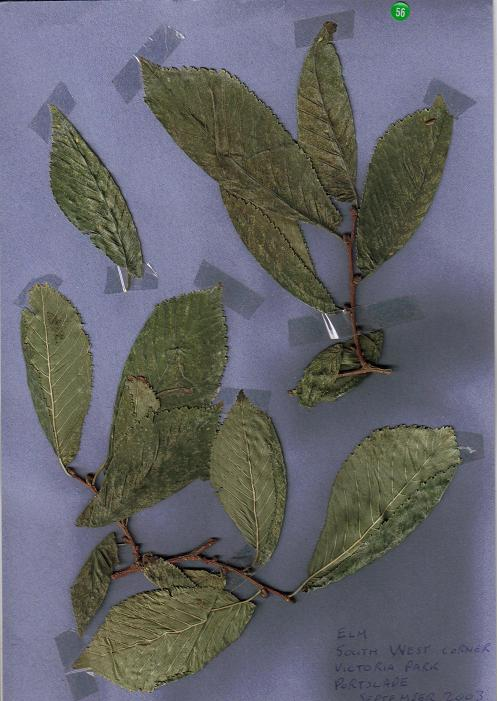
Leaves of same

The same clone is present (2019, girth 2.2 m) in Duncan Place, Leith Links, Edinburgh. (Note: Google Maps: Duncan Pl - Google Maps (May 2015), accessdate: August 23, 2016) (Note: Google Maps: Duncan Pl - Google Maps (July 2008), accessdate: August 23, 2016) (Note: Google Maps: Duncan Pl - Google Maps (May 2011), accessdate: August 23, 2016) A herbarium specimen in the Royal Botanic Garden Edinburgh incorrectly labels this clone U. racemosa. Both an U. racemosa and an U. campestris cucullata were sent by Späth to RBGE in 1902. They are listed separately in Späth's 1903 catalogue, where the former appears as U. racemosa Thomas, a synonym of the American species U. thomasii. The Edinburgh U. racemosa herbarium specimen appears, therefore, to have been mis-labelled. Its likely source-tree was the cucullate field elm clone labelled U racemosa that stood in RBGE in the 20th century, renamed by Melville in 1958 U. carpinifolia × U. plotii [:U. minor × U. minor 'Plotii']. See also Ulmus minor 'Concavaefolia'.

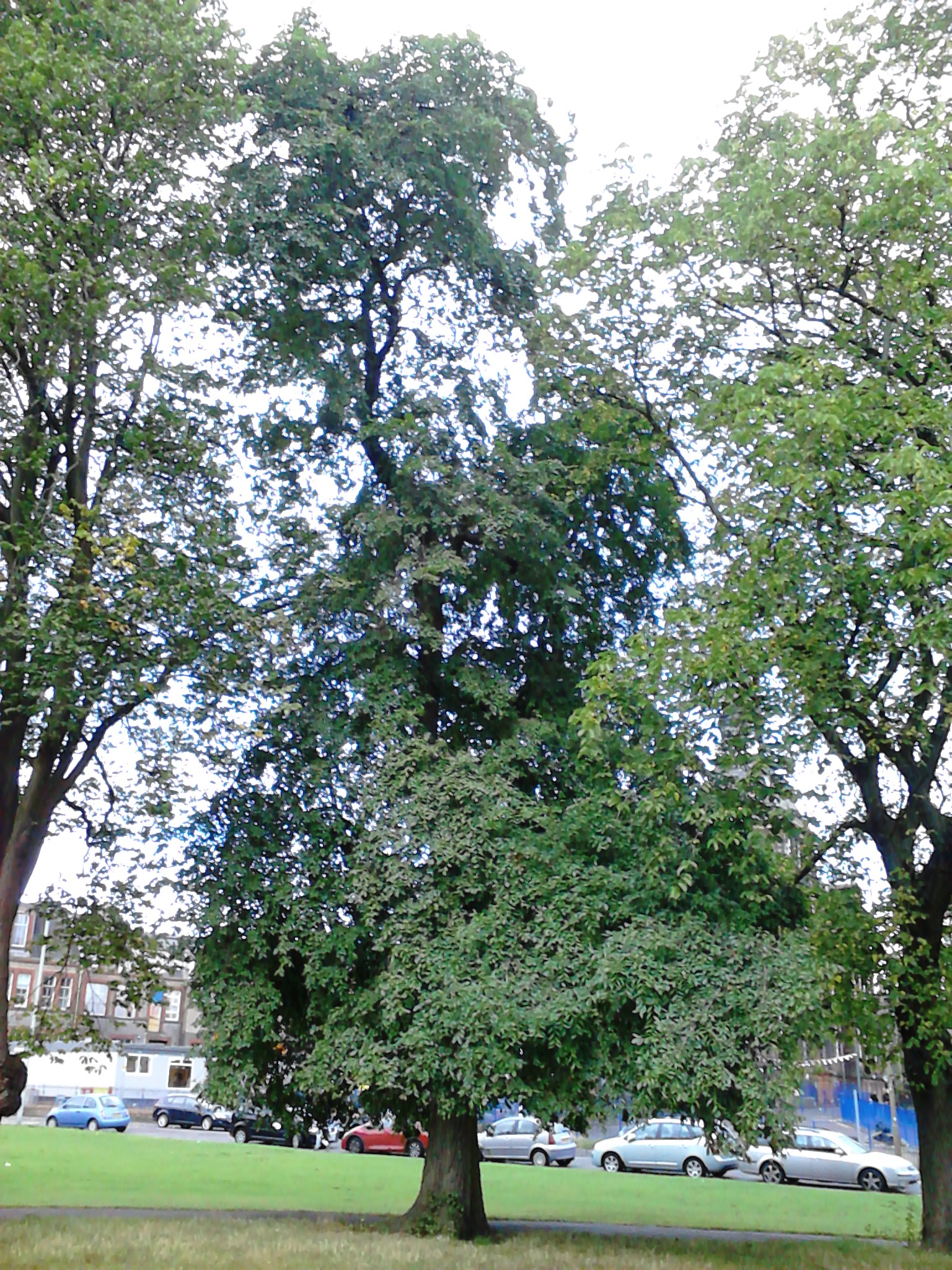
Duncan Place elm, Leith Links, Edinburgh, from west (2016)

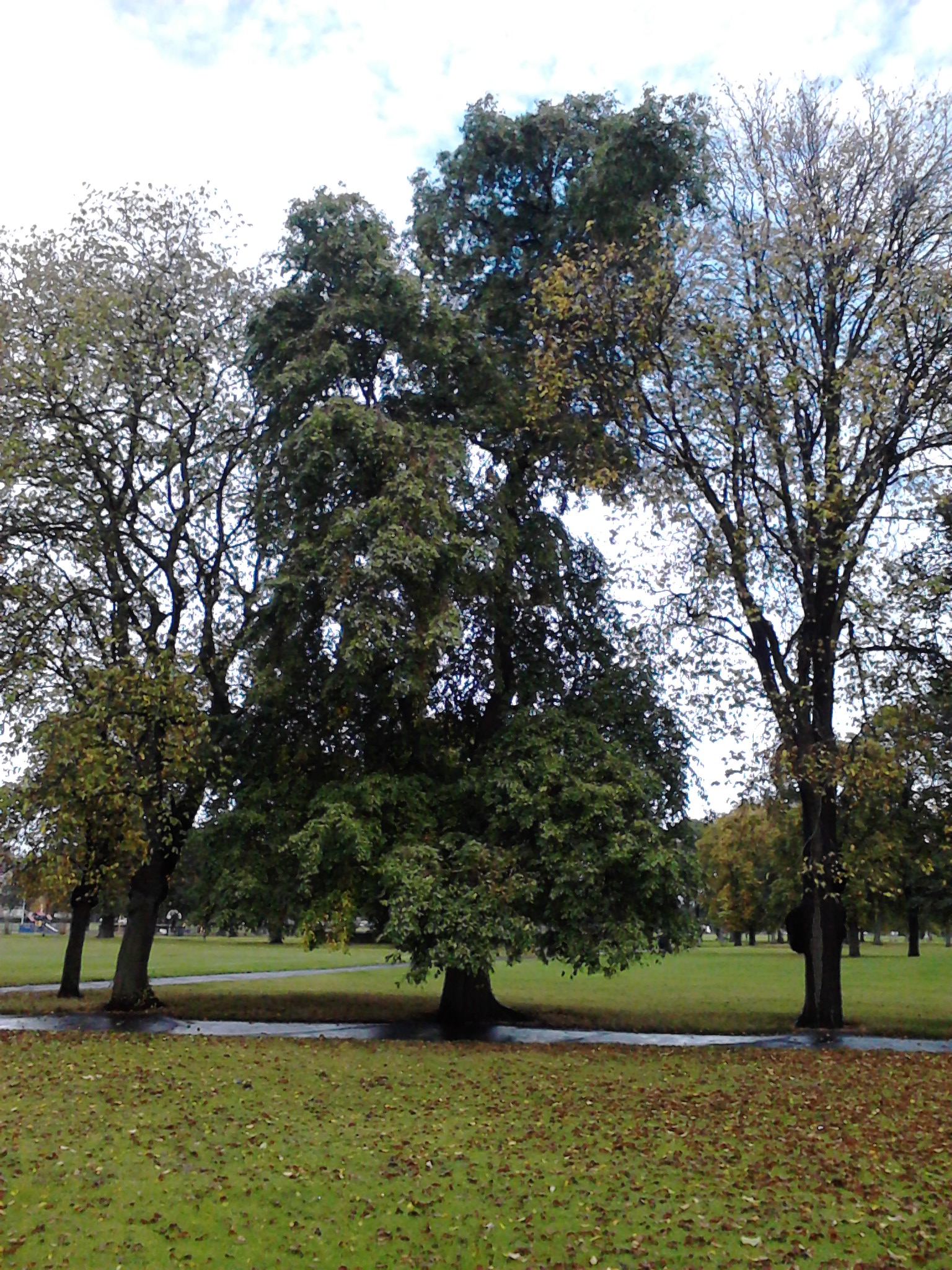
Same, from east

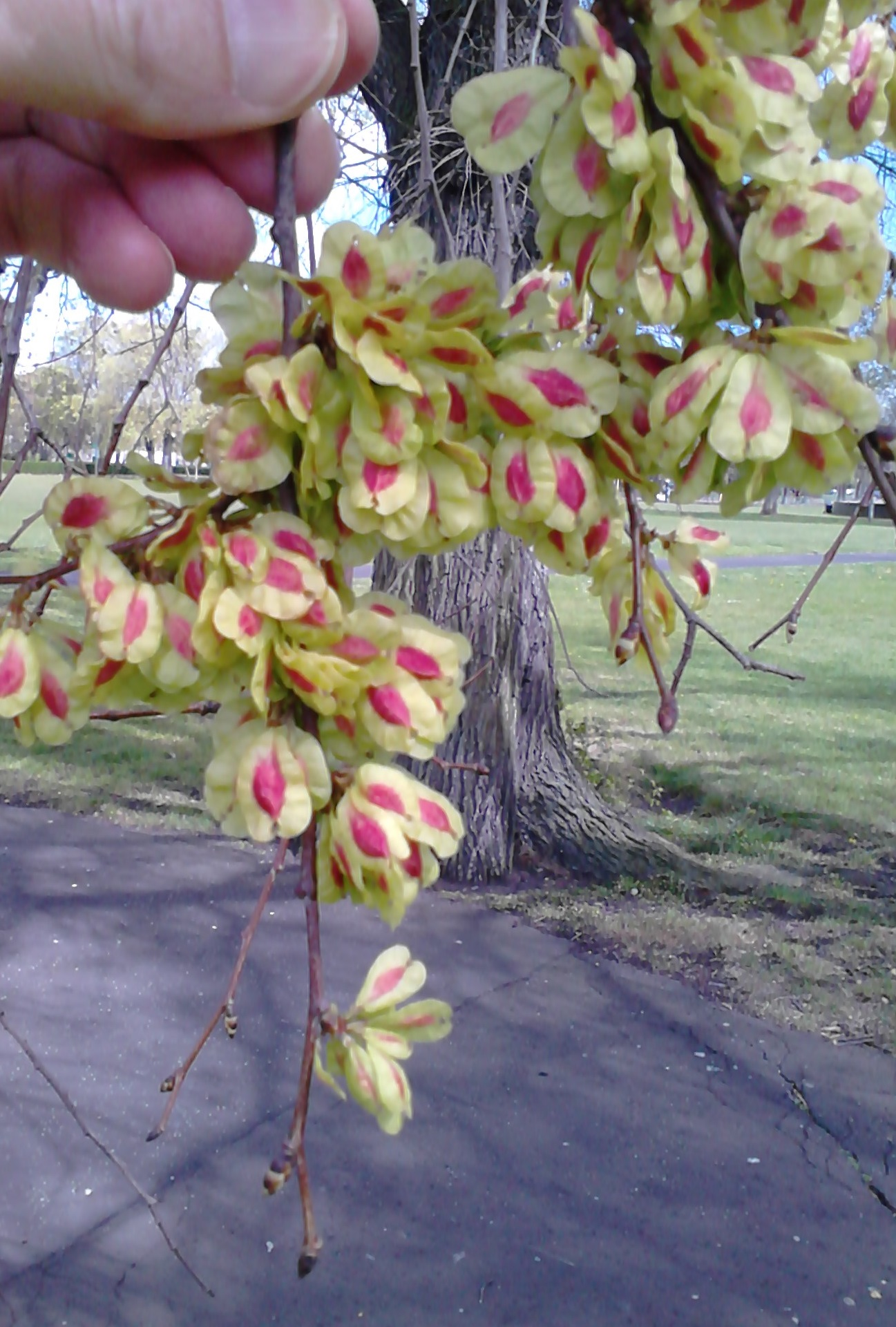
Samarae

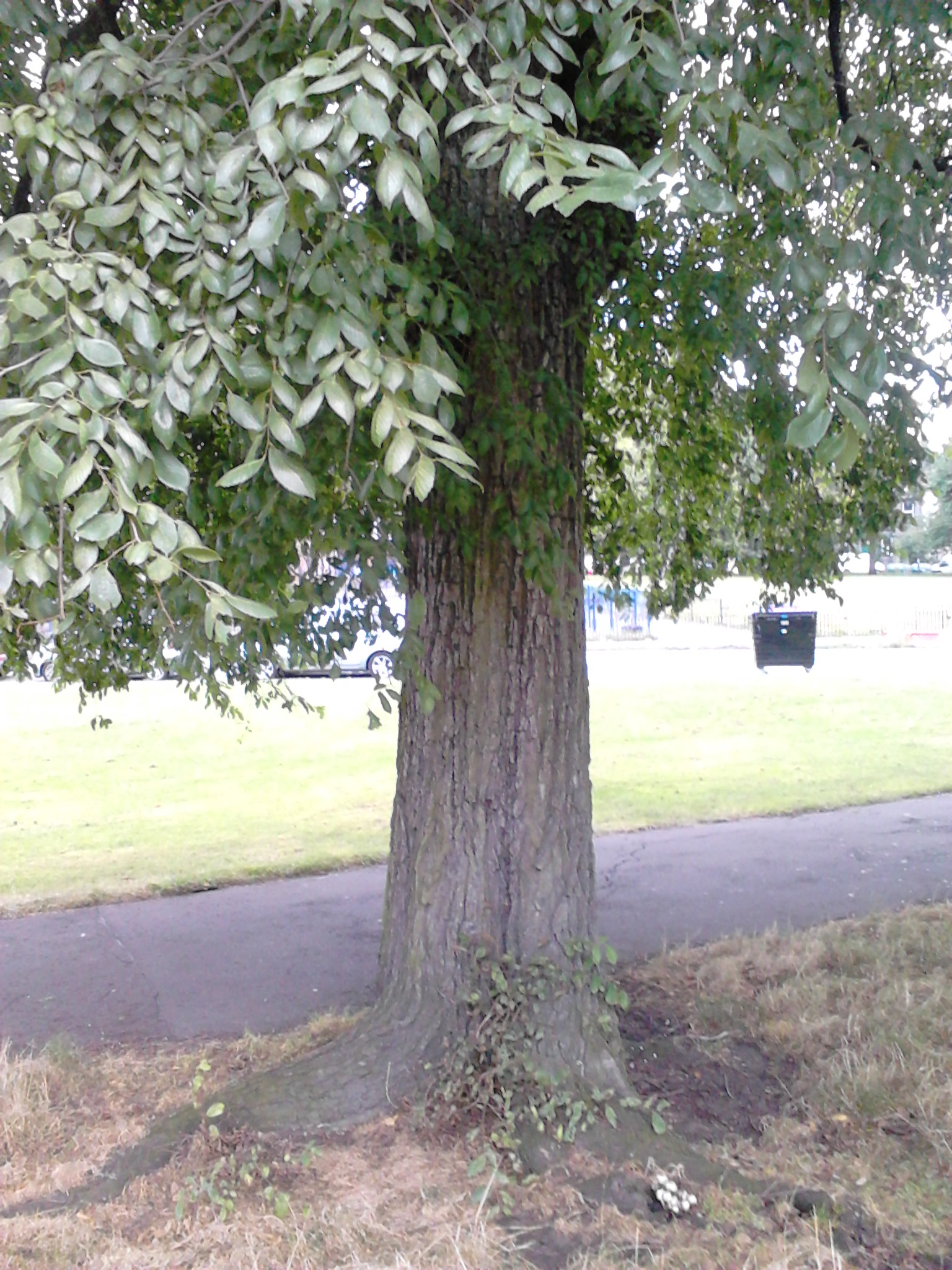
Bole

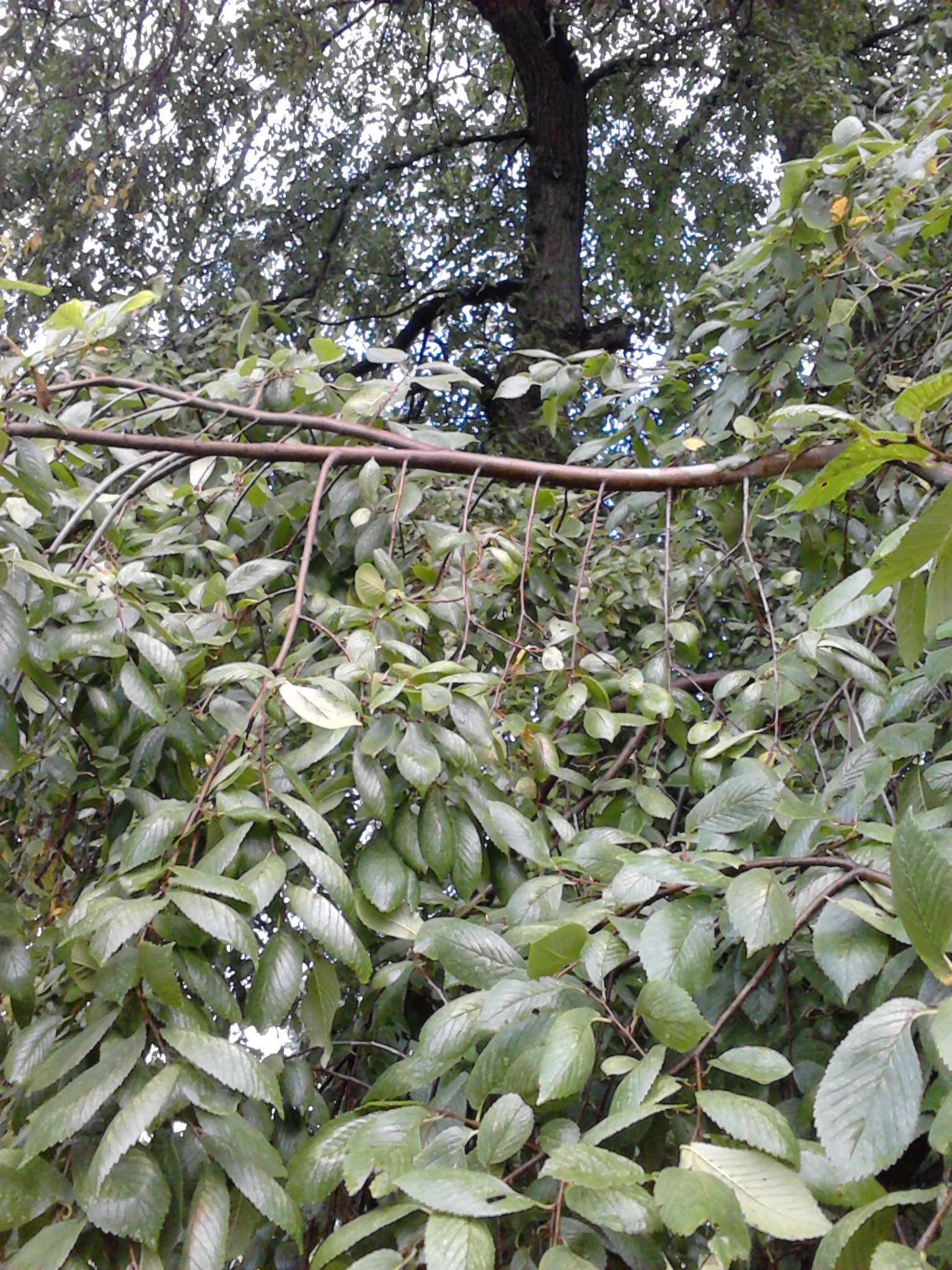
Pendant branchlets

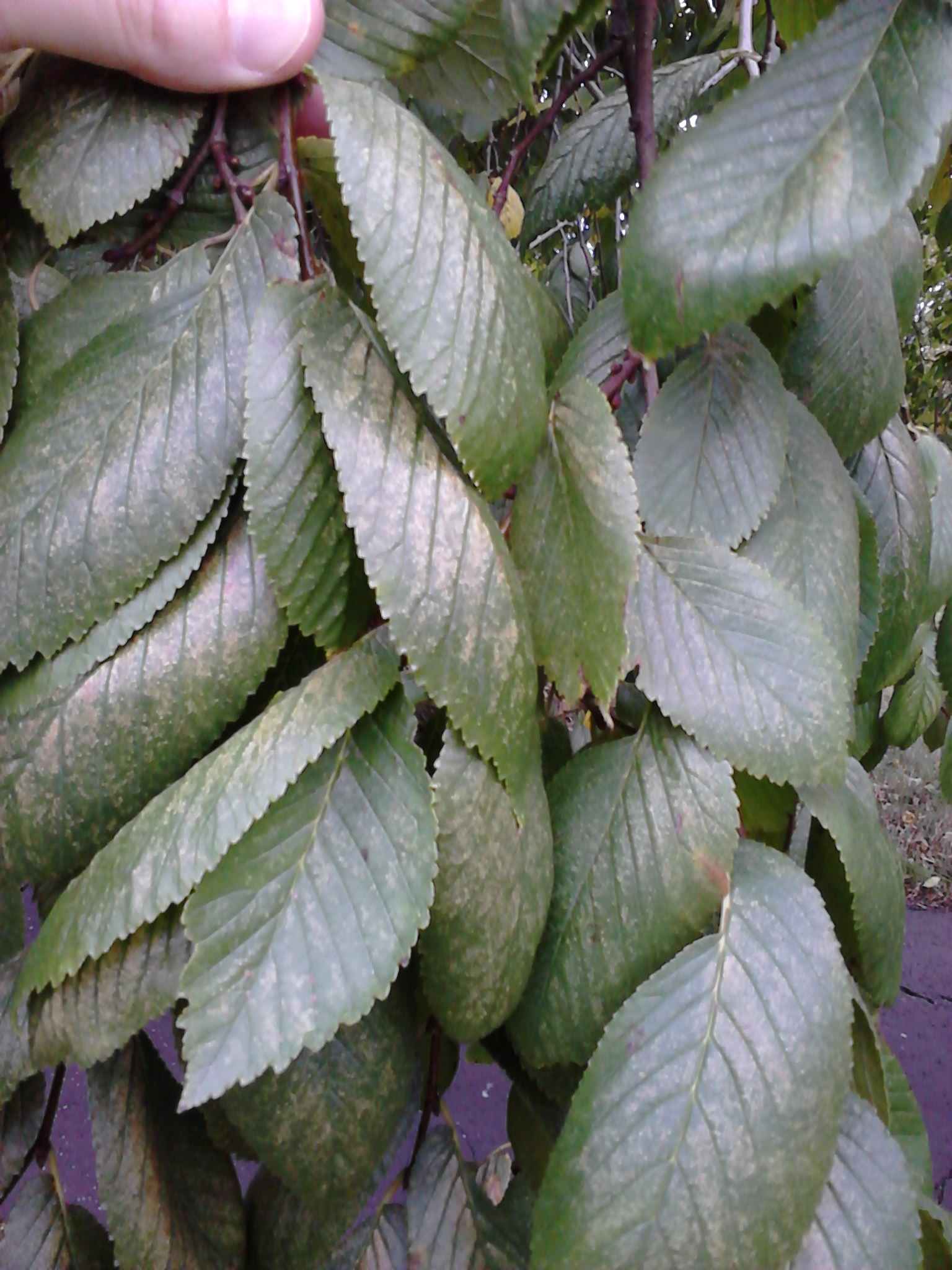
Elongated convex ('hooded') leaves of same

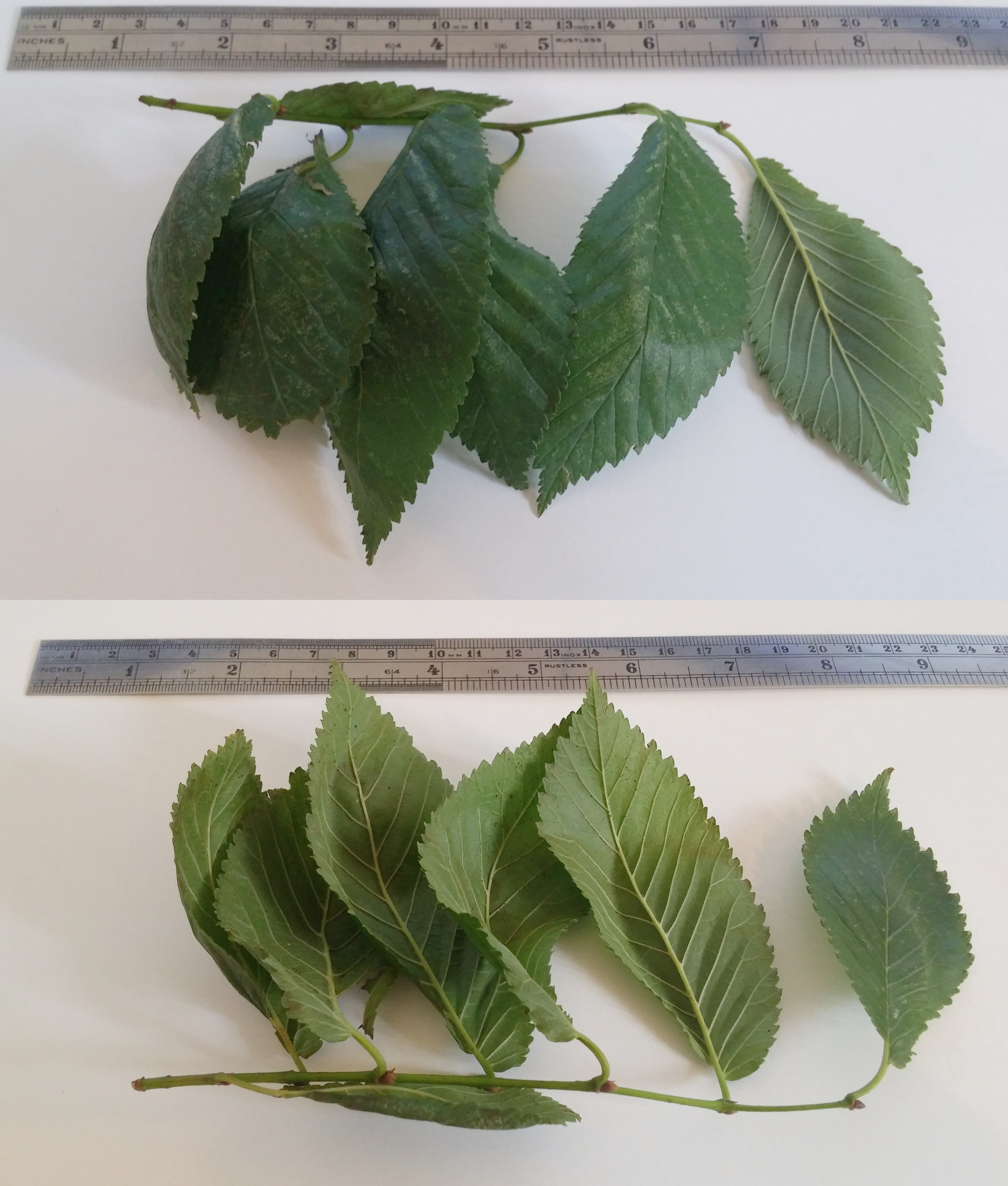
Leaf-spray

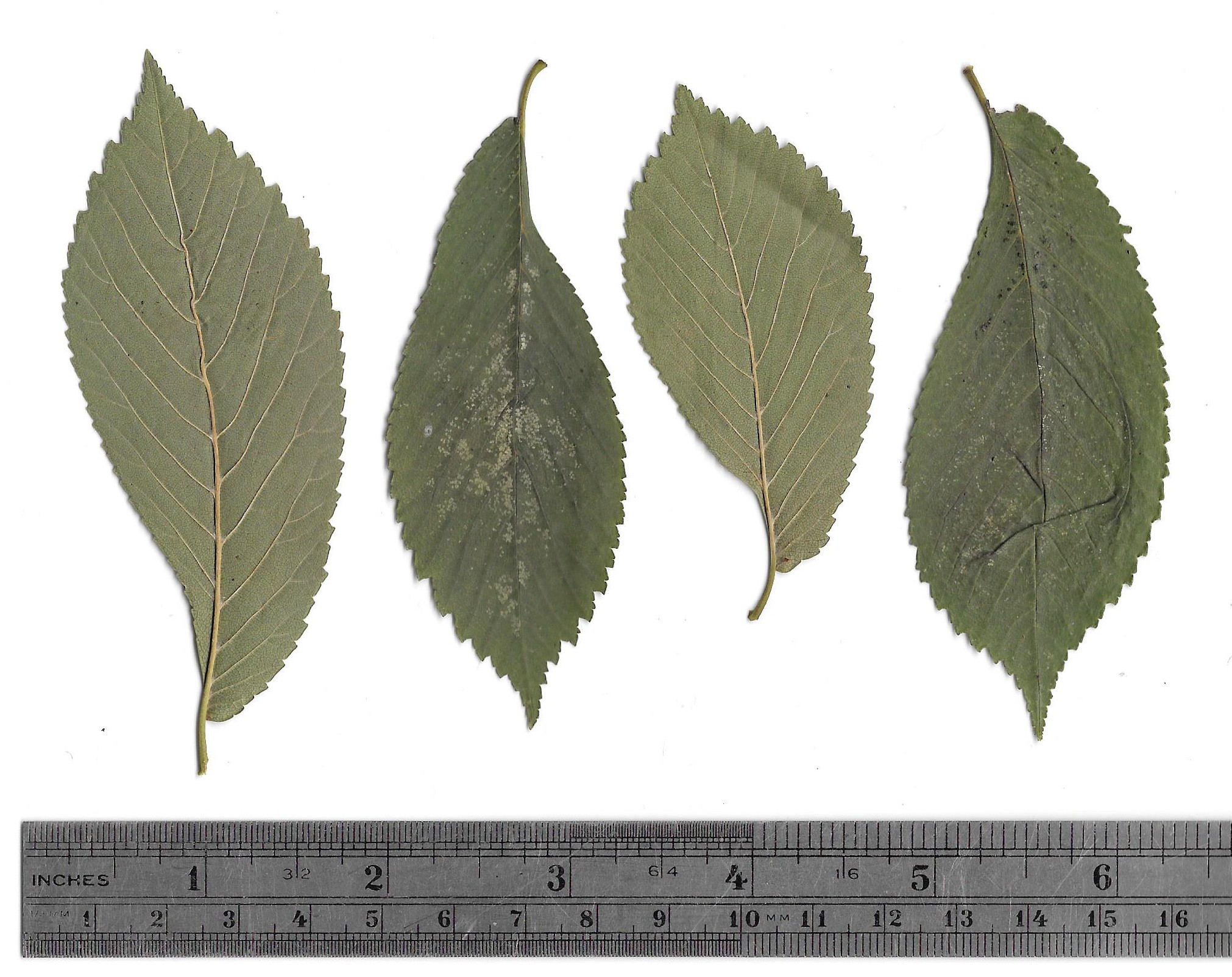
Pressed leaves

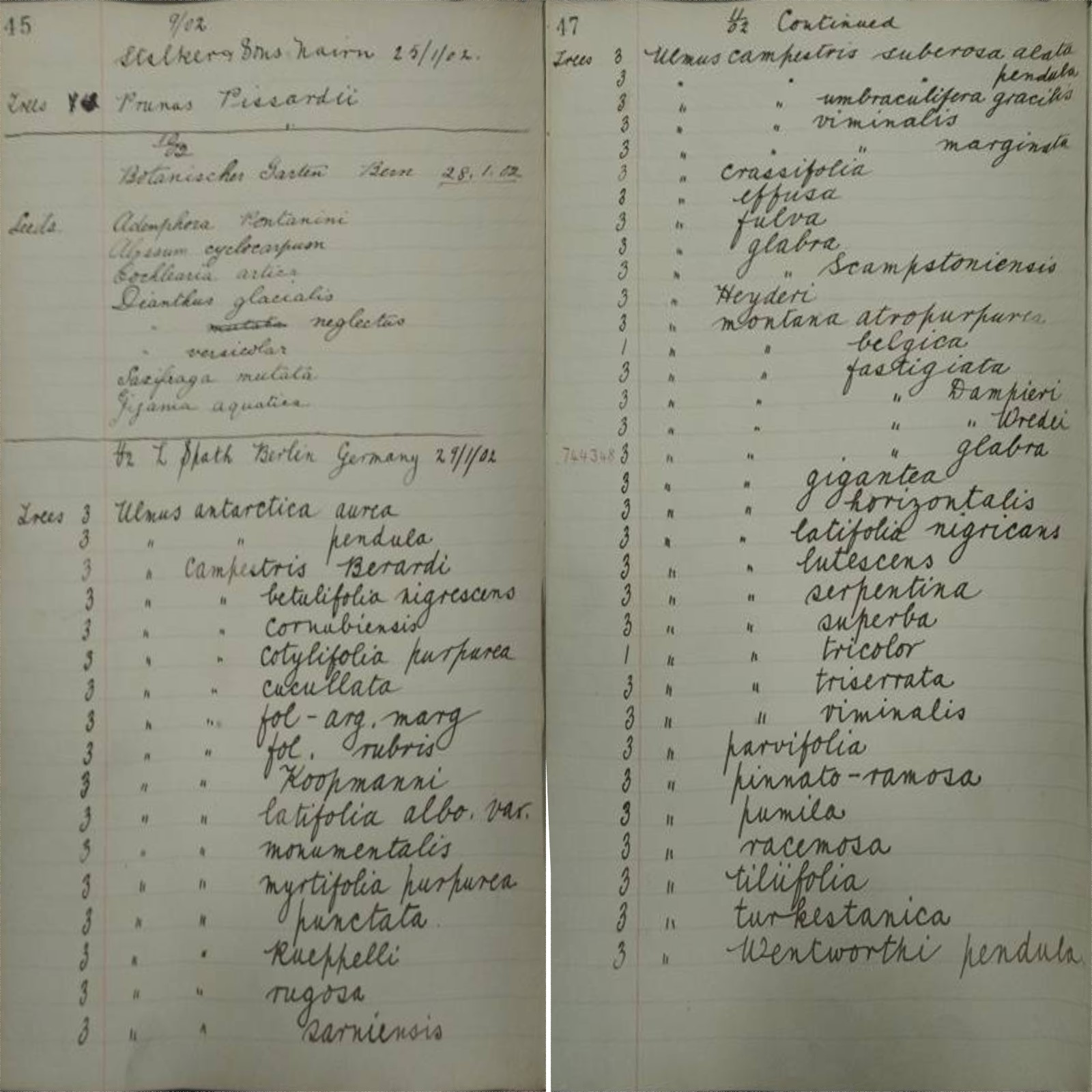
Späth's 1902 elms in the RBGE accessions book, listing his U. campestris cucullata

== Varieties ==
A variegated form, U. minor 'Cucullata Variegata', was also in cultivation from the late 19th century.

== Synonymy ==
- 'Cochleata': C. de Vos , Handboek 204. 1887.

== Accessions ==
Europe

- Brighton & Hove City Council, UK. NCCPG elm collection. One tree in Victoria Park, Portslade, Hove.
