= Ulmus 'Crispa Pendula' =

Elm cultivar

- Genus: Ulmus
- Cultivar: 'Crispa Pendula'
- Origin: England

The elm cultivar Ulmus 'Crispa Pendula', the weeping fernleaf elm, was listed in the Gardeners' Chronicle & New Horticulturist (1873) as Ulmus crispa pendula, a variety of 'Crispa', itself described as "of the U. montana type".

'Crispa Pendula' may be synonymous with the cultivar 'Adiantifolia', which appears from herbarium specimens to have a leaf similar to, but narrower than, 'Crispa'. Green, however, treated 'Adiantifolia' as a synonym of 'Crispa'.

== Description ==
'Crispa Pendula' is similar to 'Crispa' but with narrower leaves and pendulous branches.

== Pests and diseases ==
See under 'Crispa'.

== Cultivation ==
The tree was in cultivation at the Canterbury Nurseries, Kent, in 1873. No specimens are known to survive, but it is possible that some surviving 'Crispa' are 'Crispa Pendula', as the latter cultivar is now unfamiliar, and as it is known that pendulous elms are marginally less likely to attract foraging Scolytus beetles.
