= Ulmus minor 'Cucullata Variegata' =

Elm cultivar

- Species: Ulmus minor
- Cultivar: 'Cucullata Variegata'
- Origin: Europe

The Field Elm cultivar Ulmus minor 'Cucullata Variegata', a variegated form of U. minor 'Cucullata', was listed by C. de Vos, in 1867, as U. americana cucullata folia variegata and by Schelle in Beissner Handbuch der Laubholz-Benennung, 82 (1903) as U. campestris concavifolia cucullata variegata Hort, without description.

== Description ==
None available. The leaves of a variegated branchlet on a non-variegated 'Cucullata' in Edinburgh (2016) are flecked and marbled with cream and pale green. The variegated cultivar may be similar.

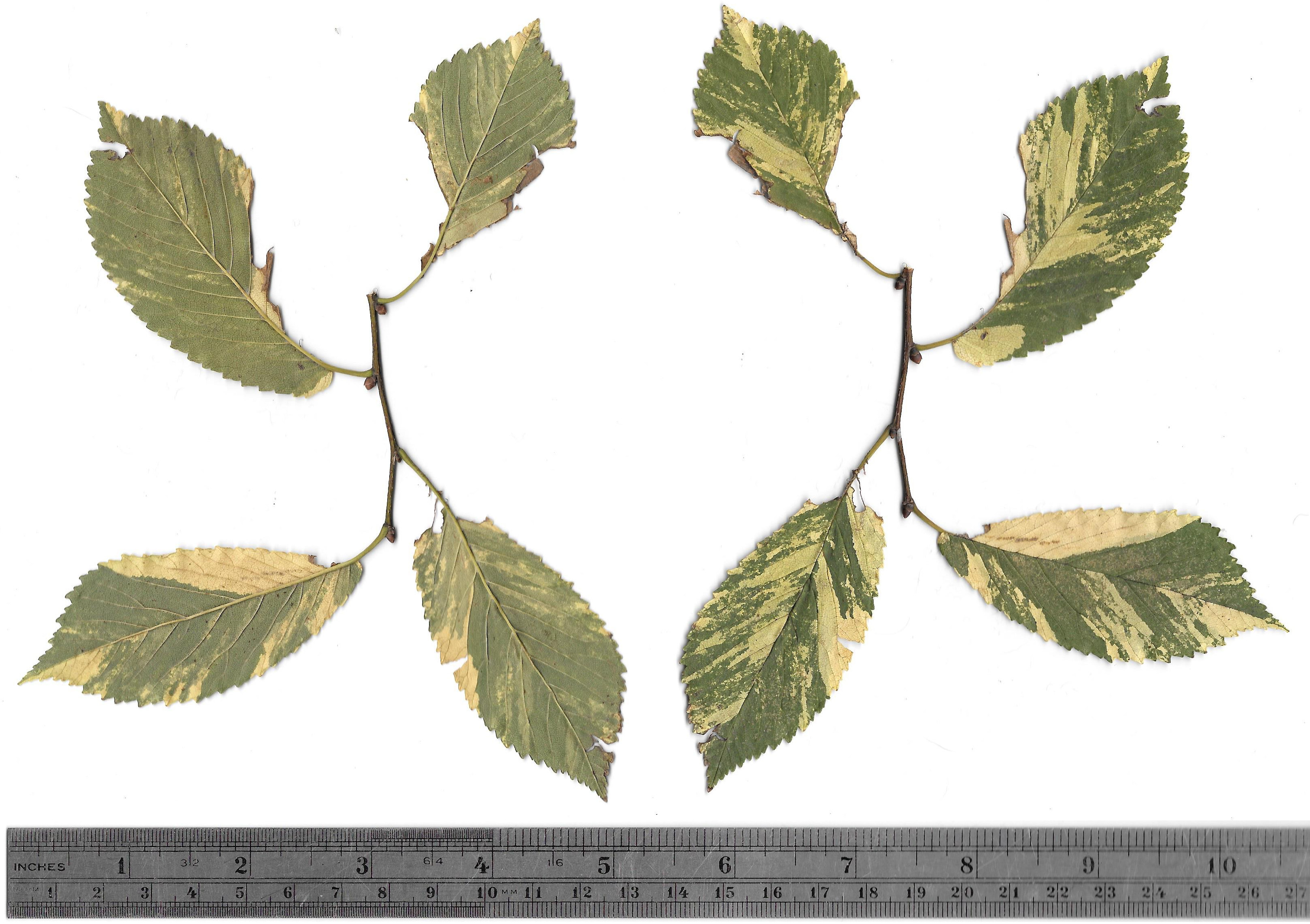
Dried variegated leaves from a non-variegated 'Cucullata'

== Pests and diseases ==
The cultivar is susceptible to Dutch elm disease.
