= Ulmus 'Crispa Aurea' =

Elm cultivar

- Genus: Ulmus
- Cultivar: 'Crispa Aurea'
- Origin: Europe

The elm cultivar Ulmus 'Crispa Aurea' was first mentioned by Schelle & Beissner in 1903, as Ulmus montana crispa aurea.

== Description ==
Schneider described it in 1904 as like 'Crispa' but with more or less golden leaves. Elwes and Henry (1913) described the leaves as "yellowish".

== Pests and diseases ==
See under 'Crispa'.

== Cultivation ==
No specimens are known to survive.
