= Ulmus minor 'Concavaefolia' =

Elm cultivar

- Species: Ulmus minor
- Cultivar: 'Concavaefolia'
- Origin: England

Ulmus minor 'Concavaefolia' is a field elm cultivar briefly described by Loudon in Arboretum et Fruticetum Britannicum (1838), as Ulmus campestris var. concavaefolia. A fuller description followed in Petzold and Kirchner 's Arboretum Muscaviense (1864). Henry noted that Loudon's "insufficiently described" U. campestris var. concavaefolia seemed to be identical with the field elm cultivar 'Webbiana', a view repeated by Krüssmann.

== Description ==
Loudon thought the tree resembled his 'Cucullata' (probably the cultivar later called Ulmus montana cucullata Hort.). Petzold and Kirchner in Arboretum Muscaviense (1864) described the leaves of their Ulmus campestris concavaefolia, as short and rounded, dark green above and whitish green below, "more or less concave", that is, curling upwards at the edges so that the pale underside is more prominent than the darker upper (a description, as Henry noted, that matches 'Webbiana'). They noted that the leaves of their var. concavaefolia were smaller than those of their var. cucullata (again, probably Ulmus montana cucullata Hort.), but not dissimilar in shape.

== Cultivation ==
If synonymous with 'Webbiana', 'Concavaefolia' is rare but remains in cultivation.

Royal Victoria Park, Bath had three Ulmus campestris var. concavaefolia, "concave-leaved field elm", in the second half of the 19th century and in the early 20th, Frederick Hanham describing them in 1857 as "a very ornamental and beautiful variety". He added that the tree was "frequently mistaken and sold in the nurseries for Ulmus montana crispa, though there is a wide difference between them". The Bath trees could not have been 'Webbiana' either, as they were still present in 1902 when they were listed separately from the park's Webb's elm. They may, however, have been the cultivar sometimes called Ulmus scabra concavaefolia, as this striking elm was in cultivation at the time but appeared on neither 1857 nor 1902 Bath list. Though currently (2025) classified as a wych cultivar, its leaves are smaller than the type, and may have passed for field elm in the 19th century.

See also 'Convex-leaved field elms' below.

== Synonymy ==
- ? U. campestris viscosa Hort.: Petzold and Kirchner (1864)
- ? U. nitens var. Webbiana: Henry (1913)

== Convex-leaved field elms ==
A young, fastigiate, suckering, convex-leaved U. minor cultivar (concave from the underside), stood in the yard of St James's Church, Constitution Street, Leith, till 2017, where an 1882 print showed a narrow elm-like tree, probably the original planting. Its sucker regrowth remains. A second similar convex-leaved suckering field elm stands in East Fettes Avenue, Edinburgh. The leaves of both resemble those of sweet basil, unlike Petzold and Kirchner's var. concavaefolia (probably 'Webbiana').

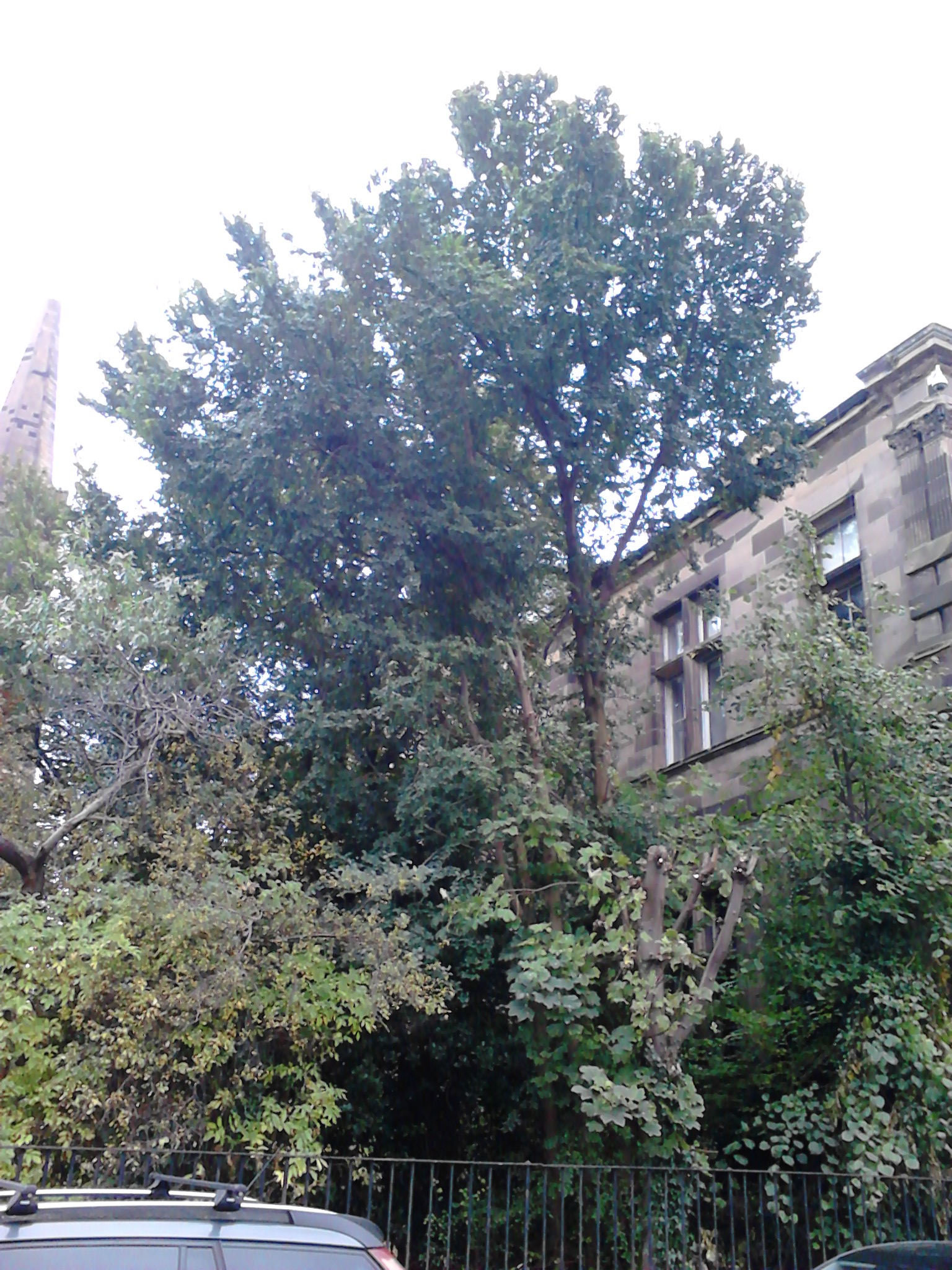
Convex-leaved field elm, St James's Church, Charlotte Street, Leith

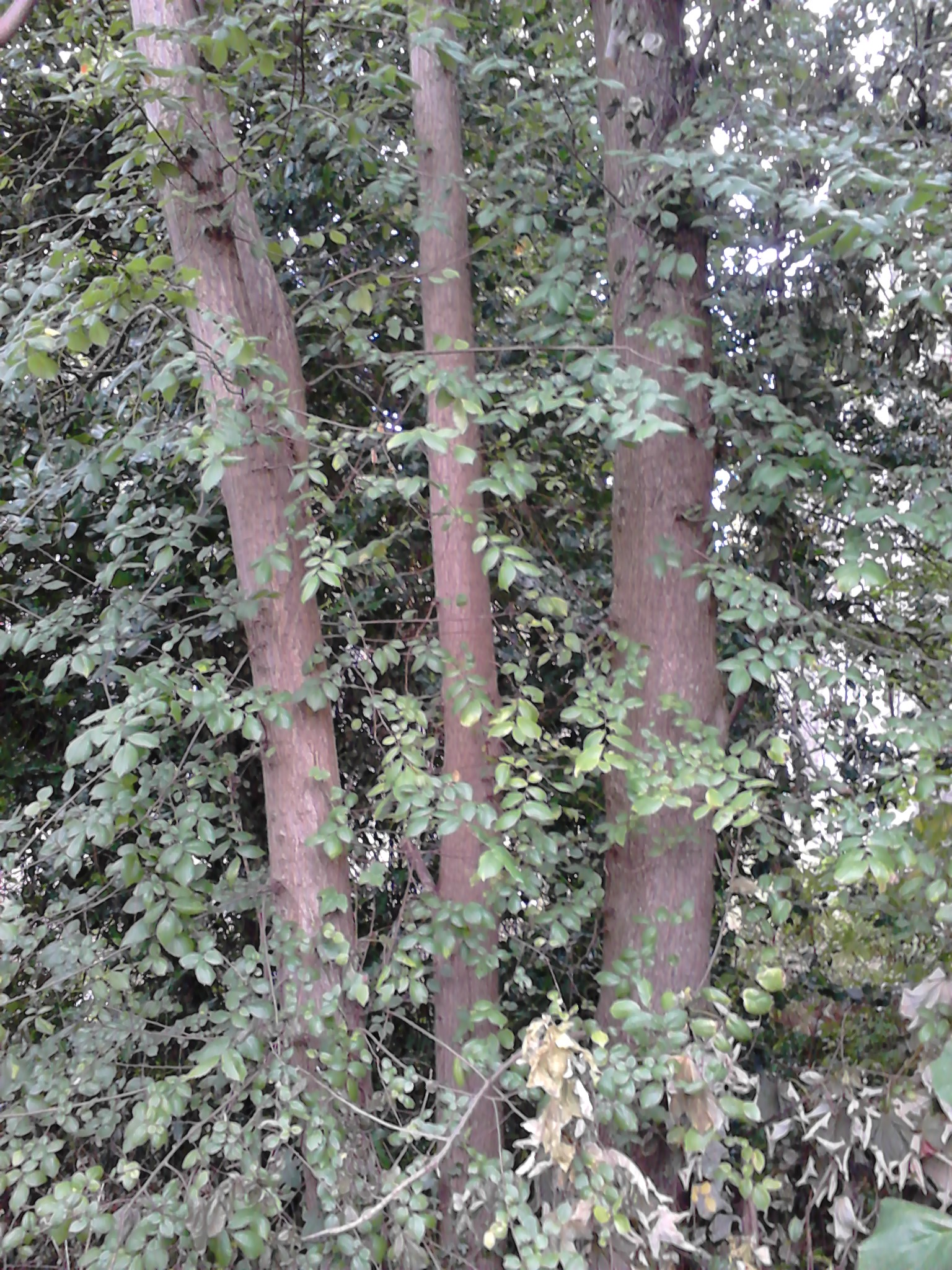
Stems of same

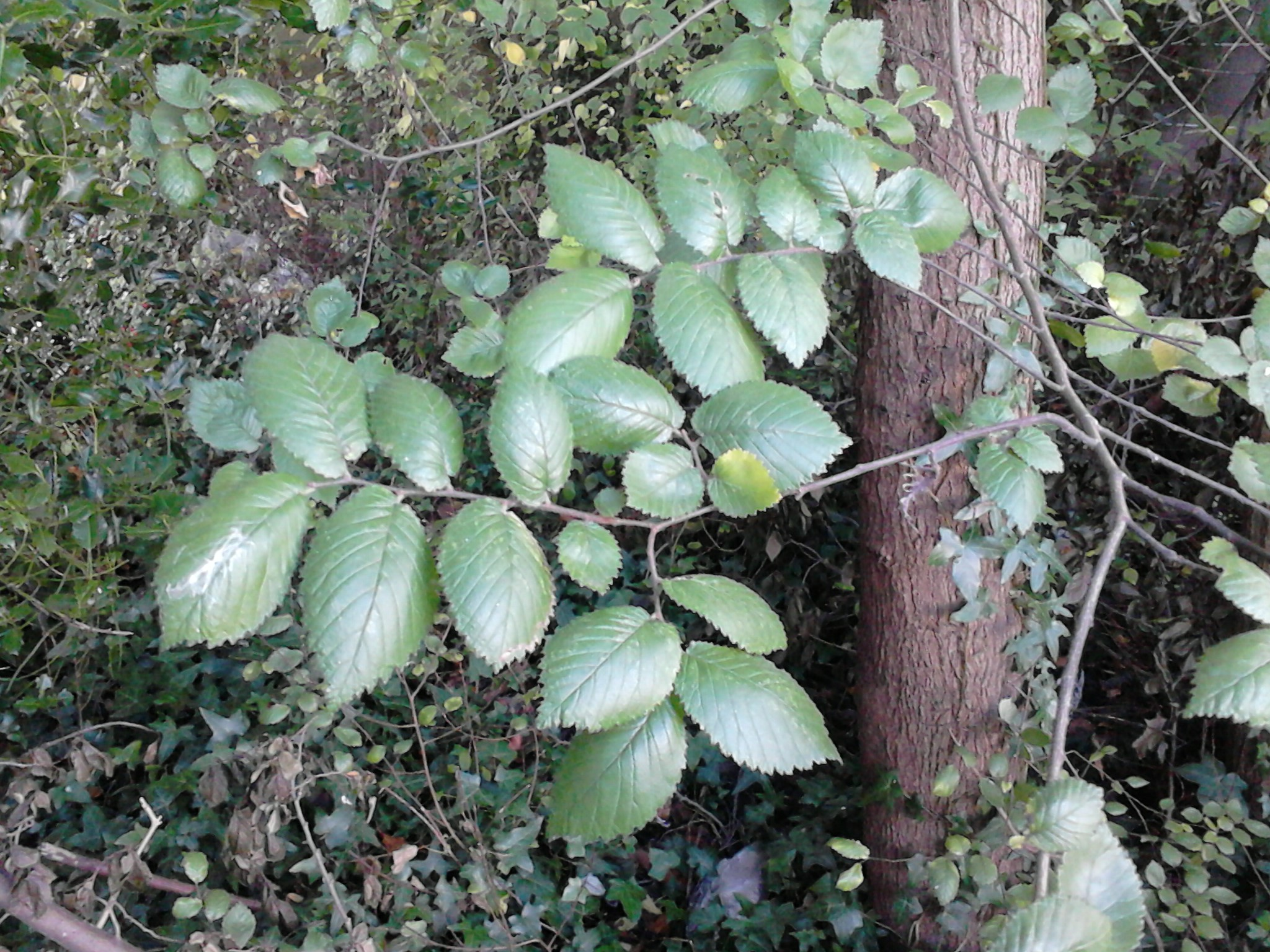
Foliage of same

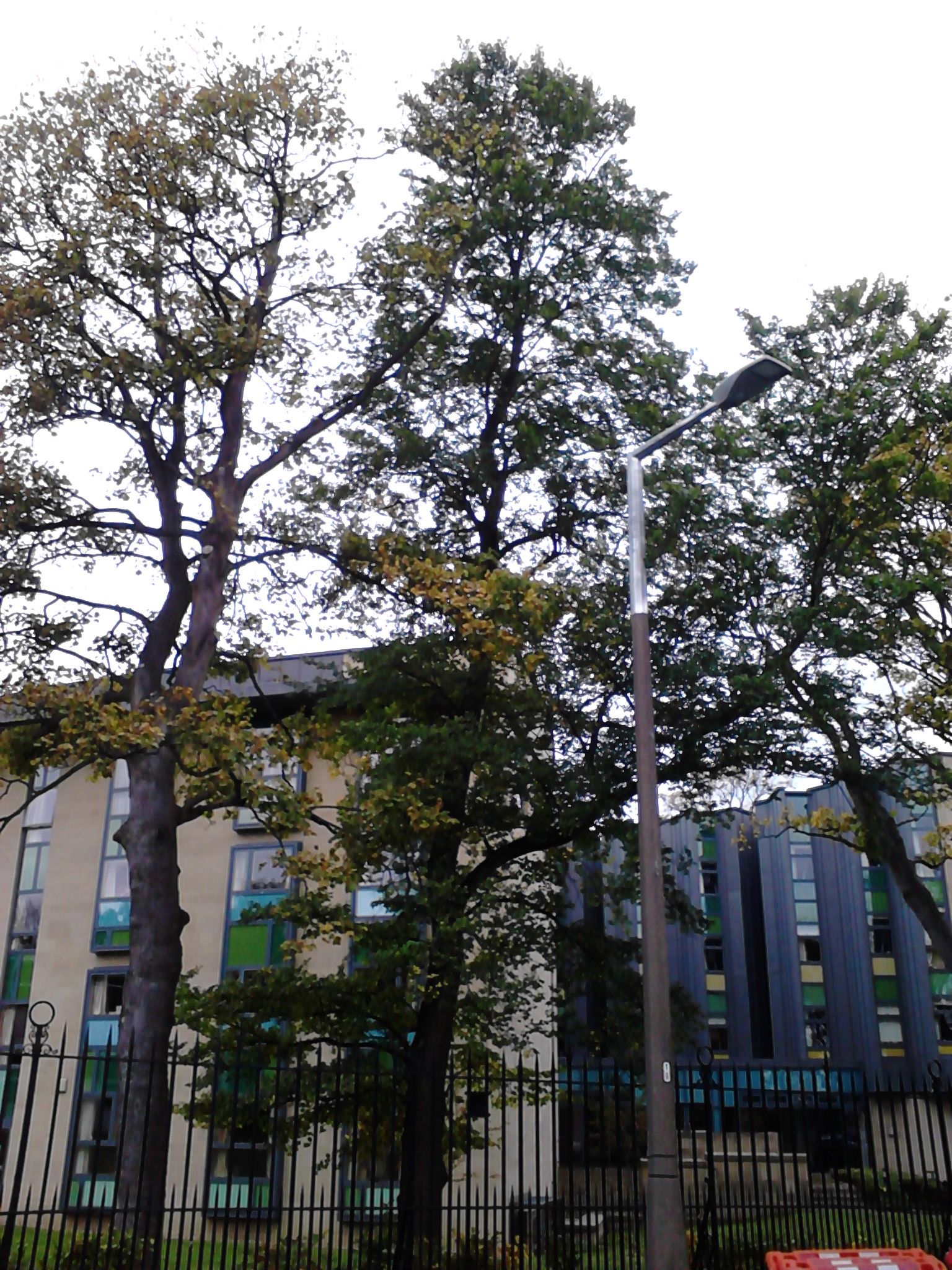
Convex-leaved field elm, East Fettes Avenue, Edinburgh

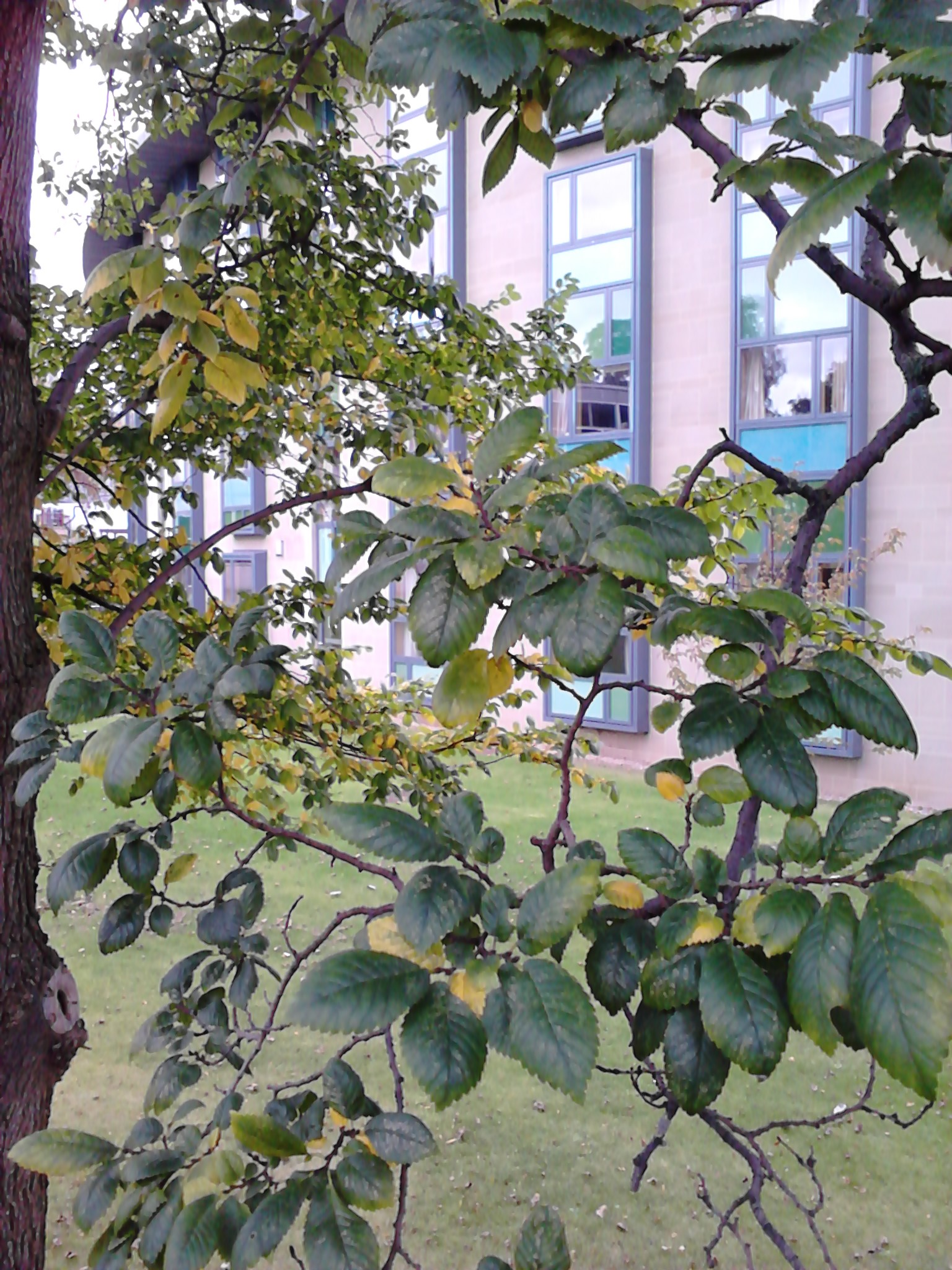
Foliage of same

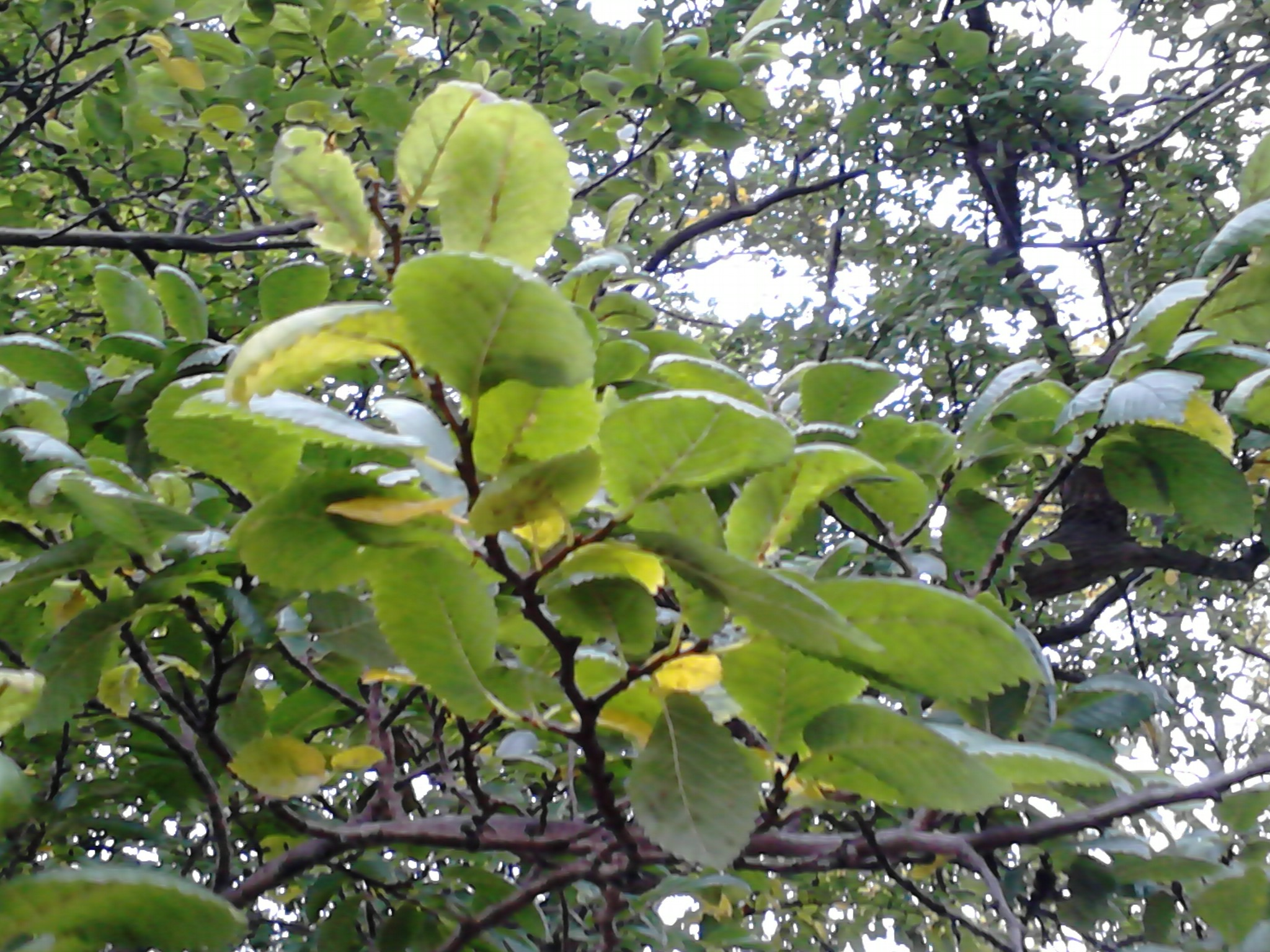
Foliage, underside

For a convex-leaved field elm with a more elongated, rather hooded leaf, distributed erroneously by the Späth nursery of Berlin for a short time in the early 20th century as Ulmus racemosa, in cultivation in Brighton and Edinburgh, see 'Cucullata'. No cultivar names are known for convex-leaved field elms.
