= Ulmus glabra 'Concavaefolia' =

Elm cultivar

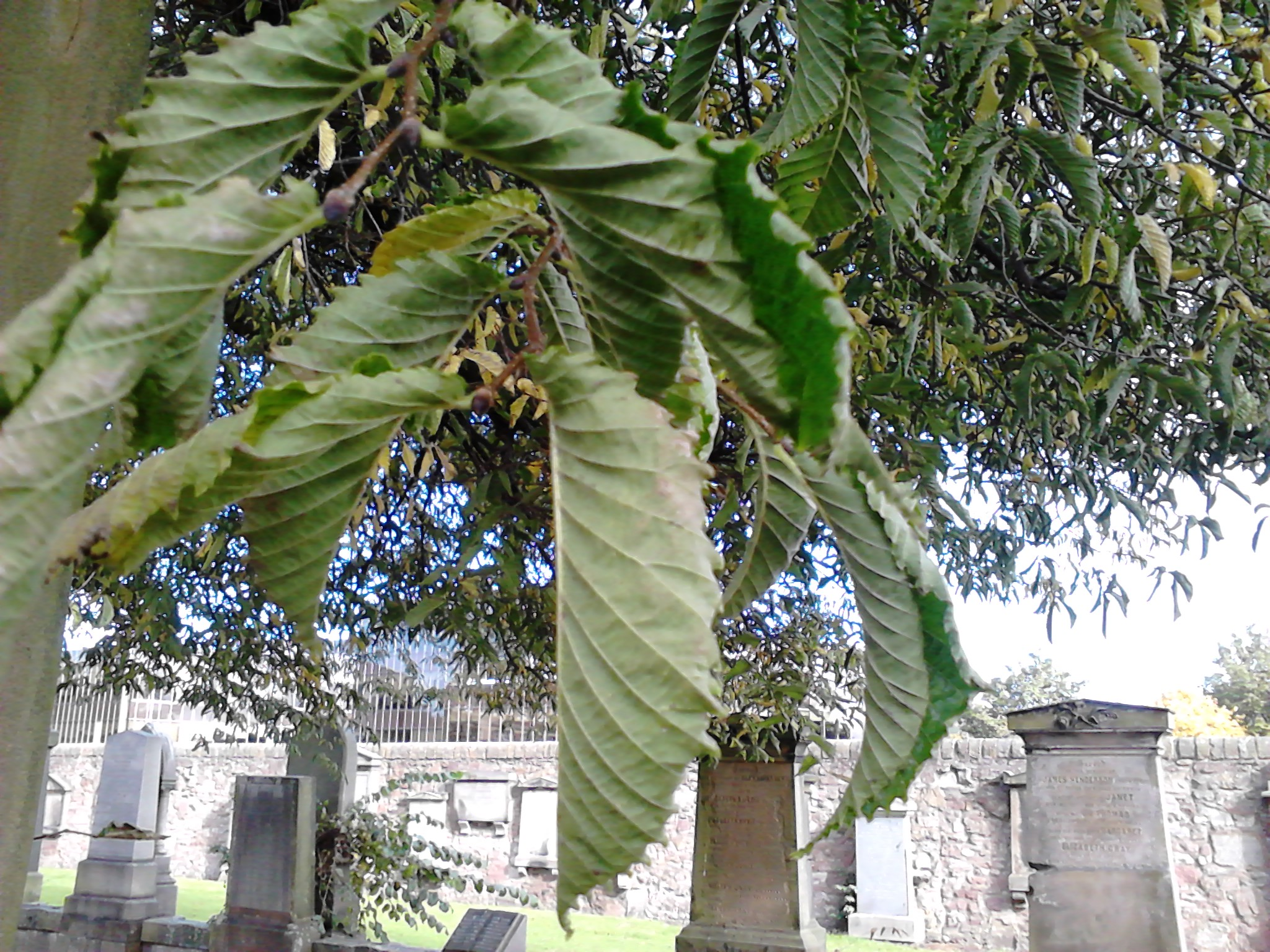
- 'Concavaefolia' leaves
- Species: Ulmus glabra
- Cultivar: 'Concavaefolia'
- Origin: Europe

The Wych Elm cultivar Ulmus glabra 'Concavaefolia' (Fontaine, 1968), a form with up-curling leaves, was listed in Beissner's Handbuch der Laubholz-Benennung (1903) as Ulmus montana cucullata Hort. [:'hooded', the leaf], a synonym of the Ulmus scabra Mill. [:glabra Huds.] var. concavaefolia of herbarium specimens. An Ulmus campestris cucullata, of uncertain species, had appeared in Loddiges' 1823 list, but Loudon's brief description (1838) of concave- and hooded-leaved elms was insufficient for later botanists to distinguish them. The earliest unambiguous description appears to be that of Petzold and Kirchner in Arboretum Muscaviense (1864).

Not to be confused with the field elm cultivar 'Webbiana', which also has longitudinally-folded, up-curling leaves (though smaller, shallower-toothed, and with longer petiole), or with concave-leaved field elms with down-curling leaves (see U. minor 'Concavaefolia' and U. minor 'Cucullata').

== Description ==
Petzold and Kirchner in Arboretum Muscaviense (1864) described the leaves of their Ulmus campestris cucullata as rough, up-curving, and bicorne-shaped, being longer and more "closed" than those of their Ulmus campestris concavaefolia (the description of which matches 'Webbiana'). The twigs had scattered hairs. The Kissena nurseries (Parsons & Sons) of New York (1903) described the leaves of their Ulmus campestris cucullata as "deeply curled like a hood, and sharply notched along the edges". Both descriptions match the U. glabra Huds. 'Concavaefolia' of Fontaine (1968), with its leaf folded lengthwise along the midrib, making it more or less tubular. Herbarium specimens show an up-curling wych leaf with a shorter petiole, more deeply toothed margin, and more acuminate apex than 'Webbiana'. The samara was confirmed by the Royal Botanic Garden Edinburgh in 2017 as U. glabra Huds..

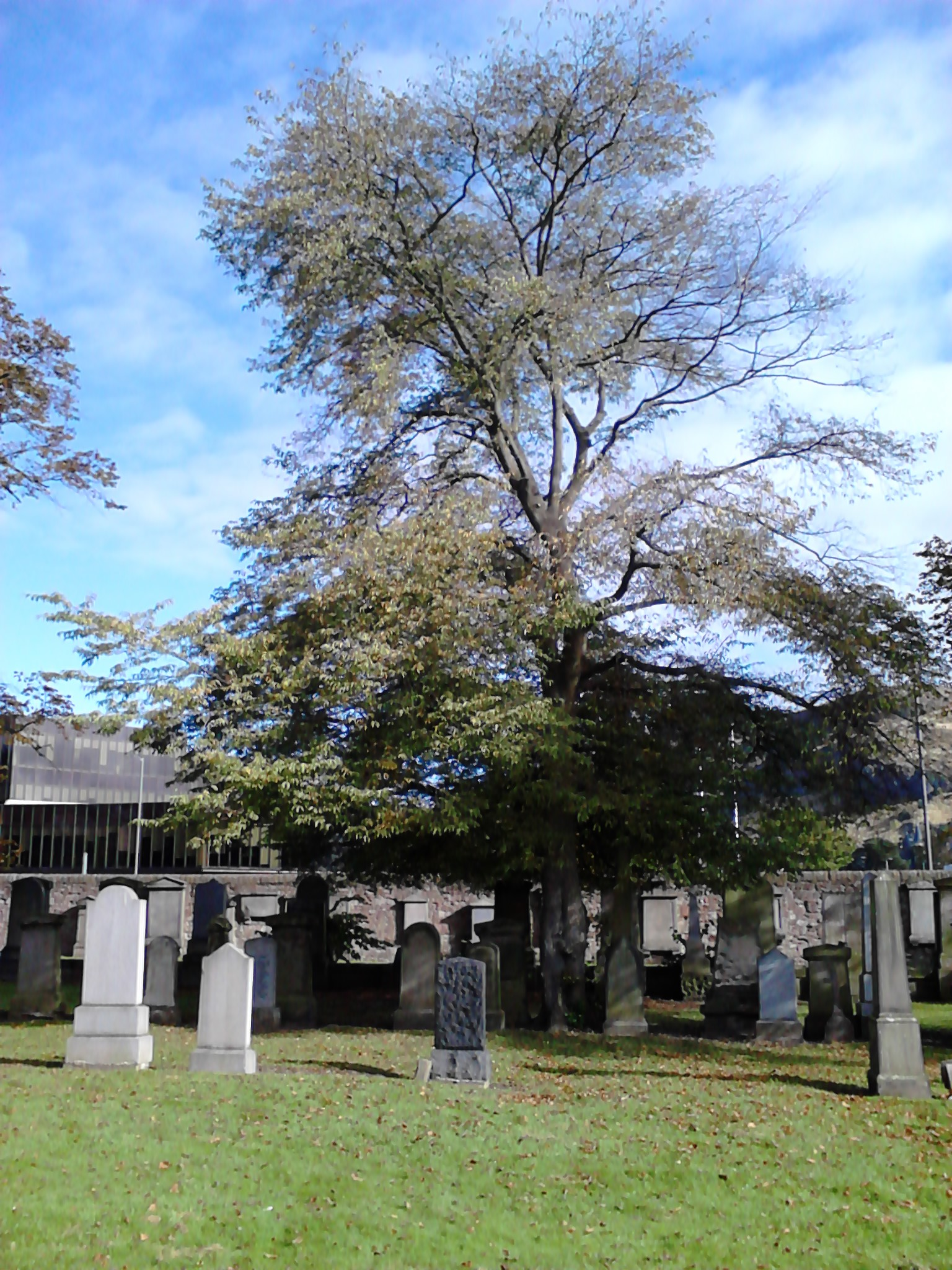
'Concavaefolia', East Preston Street Cemetery, Edinburgh, October 2016 (after upper right ascending branch removed because of DED infection)

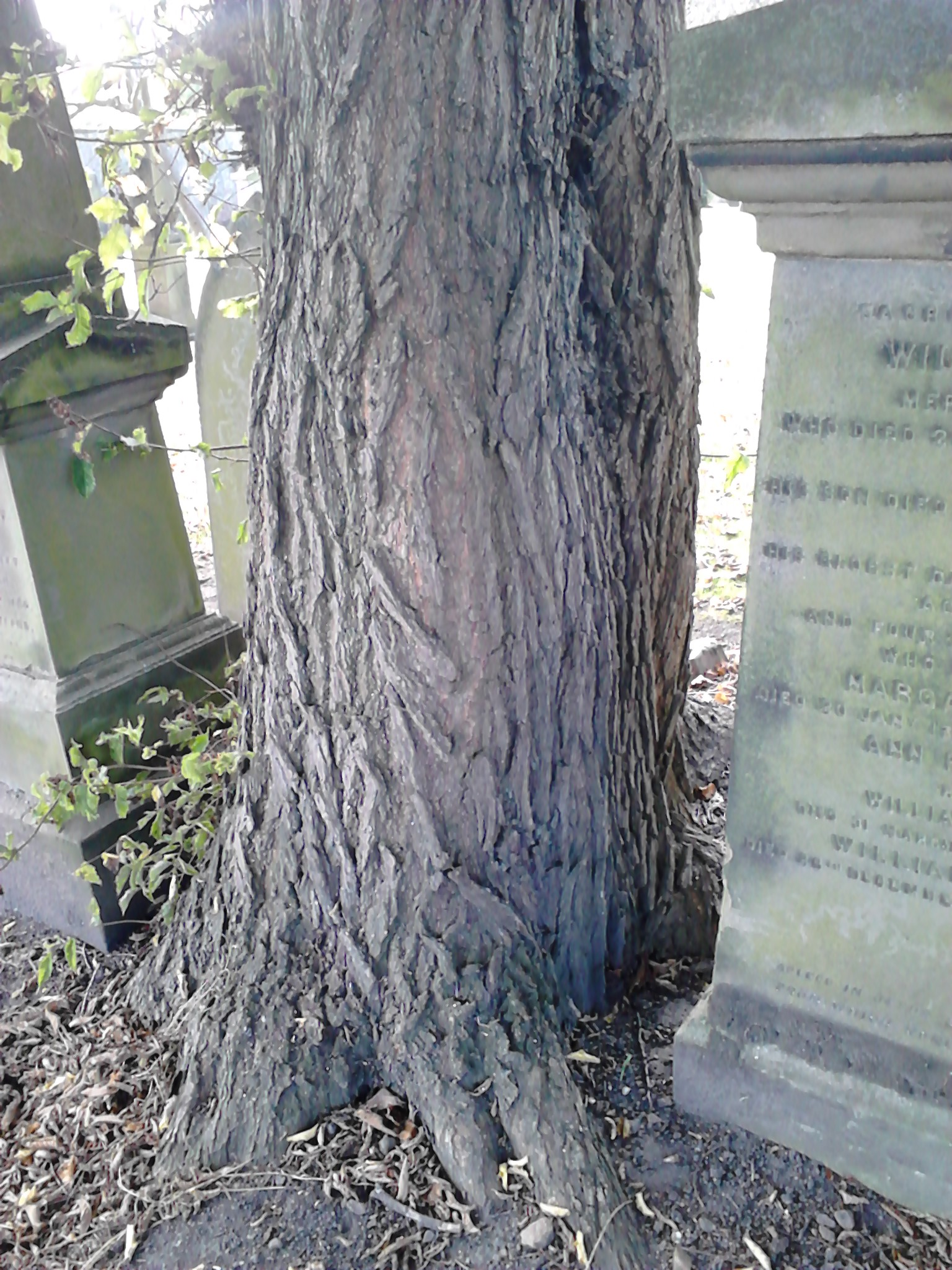
Bole

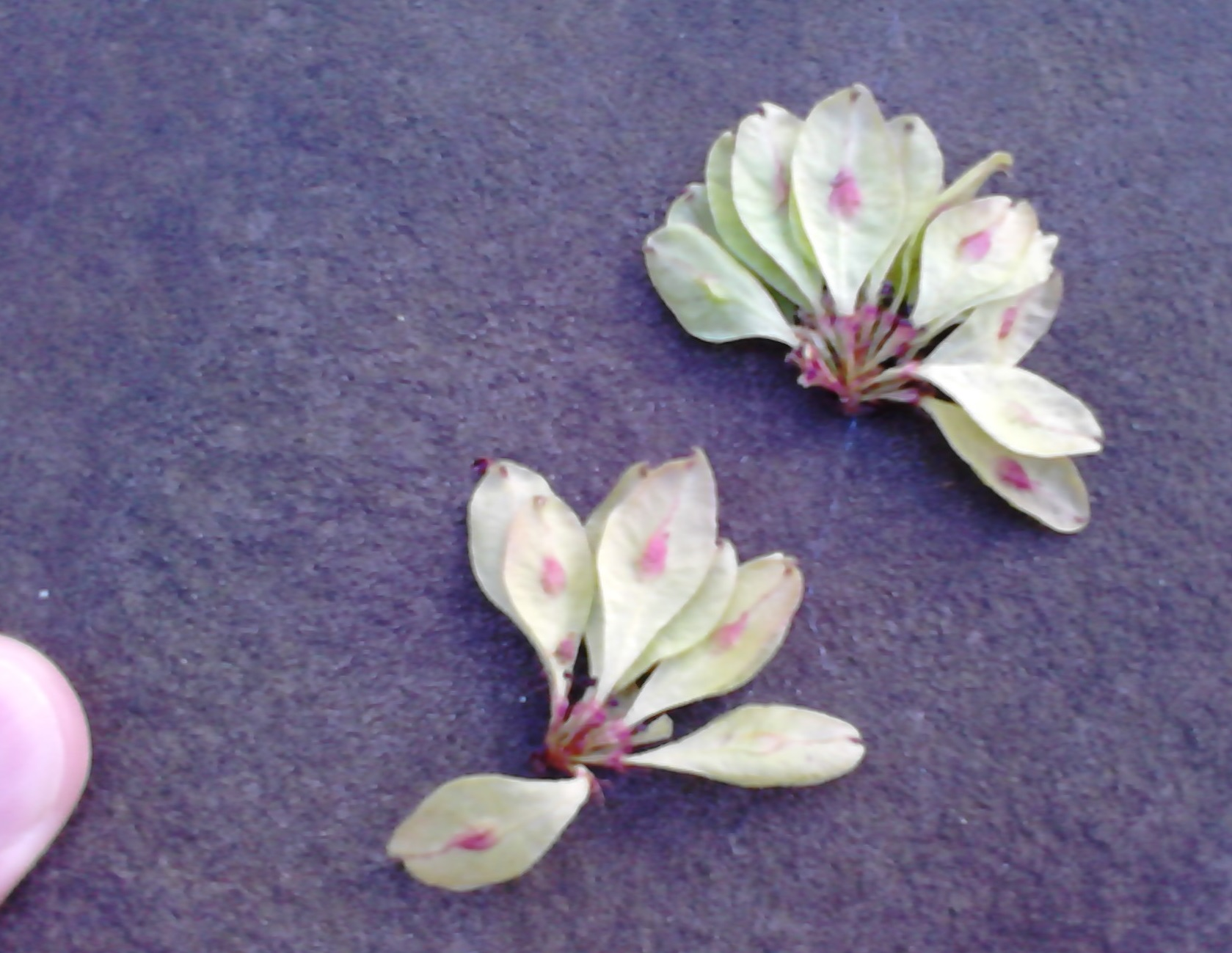
Samarae

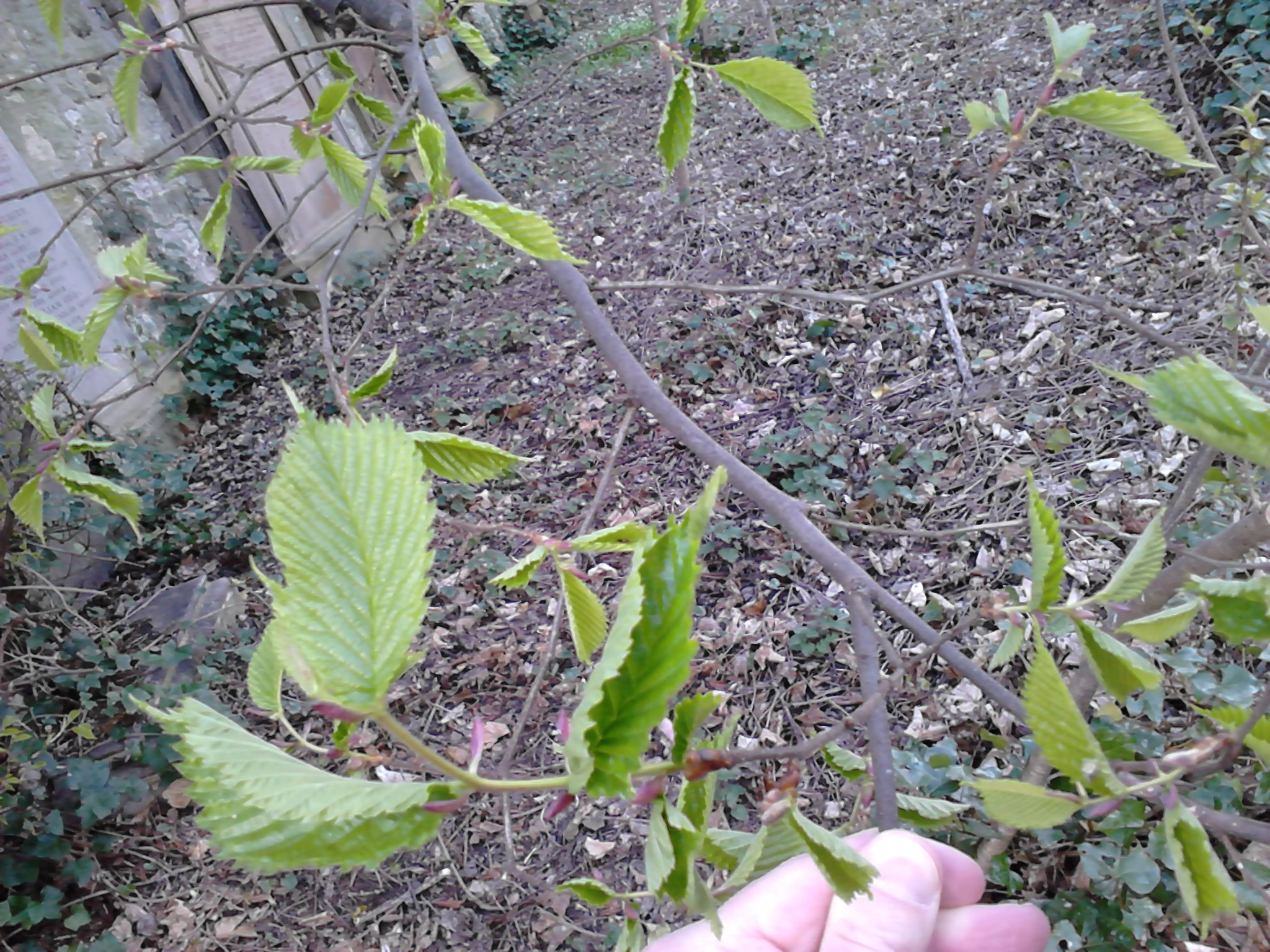
New leaves

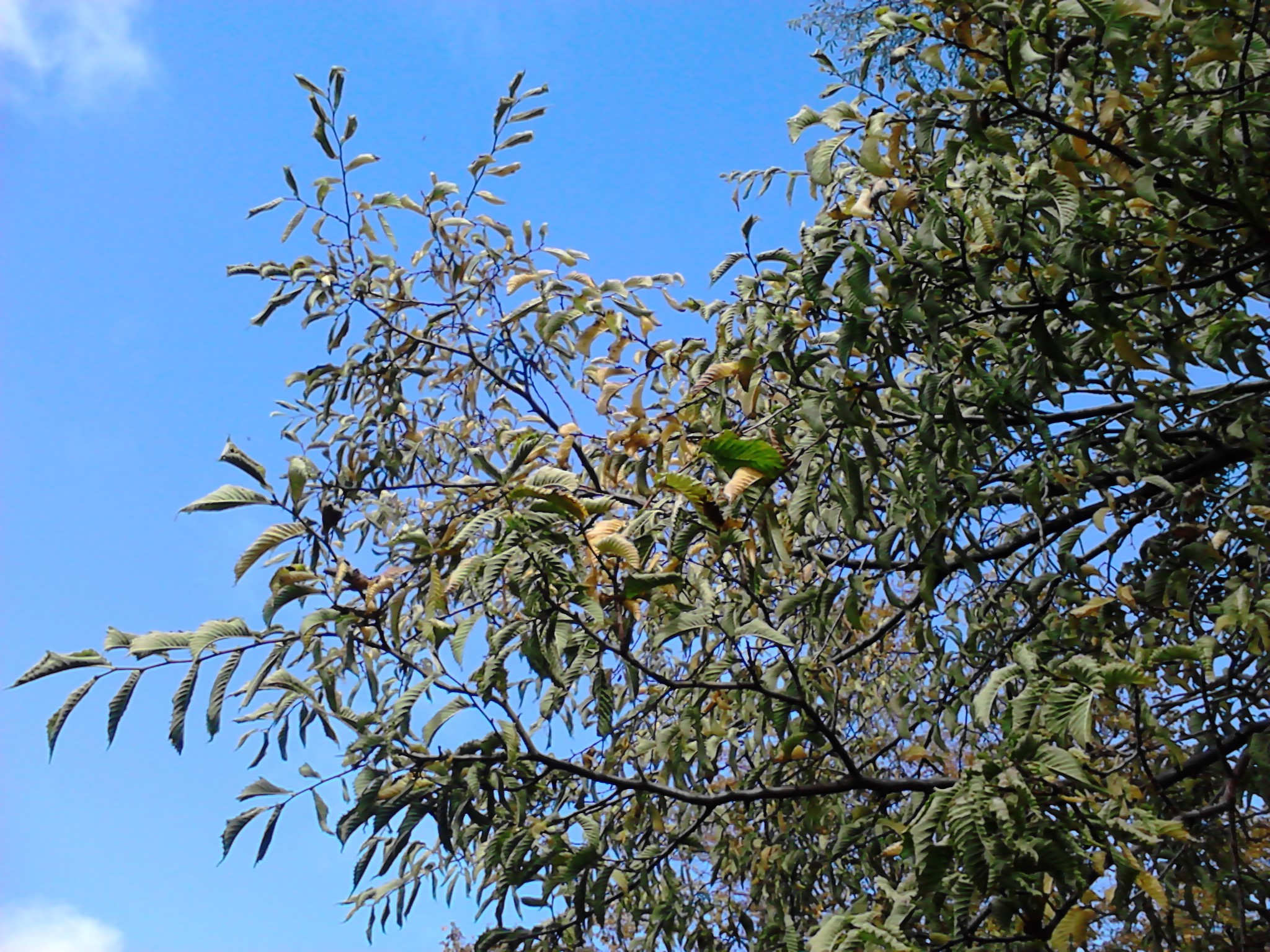
Branchlets

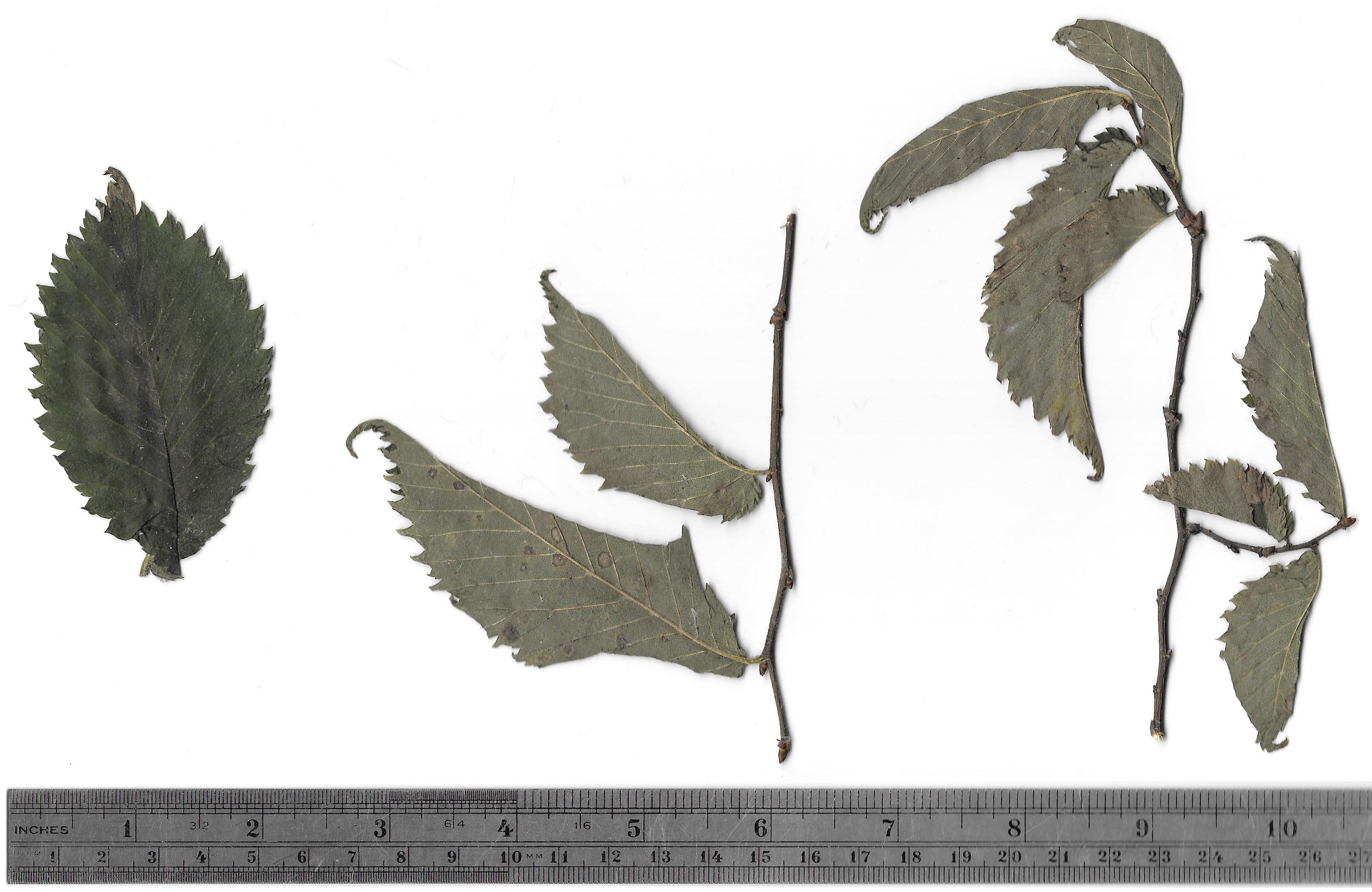
Leaves of 'Concavaefolia', one unfolded, the others pressed in curled state (Warriston Cemetery, Edinburgh, September, 2016)

== Pests and diseases ==
The tree is susceptible to Dutch elm disease.

== Cultivation ==
Though once cultivated in Europe and North America, only one specimen of 'Concavaefolia' is now known to survive (see 'Notable trees'). The cultivar was marketed as Ulmus montana cucullata Hort. by the van Houtte nursery of Ghent in the late 19th century, the name used for the specimen at Kew Gardens. 'Concavaefolia' may have been the Ulmus campestris cucullata distributed by the Späth nursery of Berlin in the late 19th and early 20th century (to go by Späth's description of hooded grey leaves) and supplied by him to the Dominion Arboretum, Ottawa, Canada (one tree, 1897), to the Royal Botanic Garden Edinburgh (three trees, 1902), and to the Ryston Hall arboretum, Norfolk (one tree, 1916). The tree was introduced to the USA c.1871, appearing as Ulmus campestris cucullata in the catalogues of the Mount Hope Nursery (also known as Ellwanger and Barry) of Rochester, New York, the name by which it was marketed by the Kissena nurseries, N.Y. The cultivar was also marketed by Trumbull and Beebe's nursery, San Francisco, in the 1890s, as "Cucullata: a new variety, with leaves deeply curled like a hood, and sharply notched along the edges". Listed as a wych cultivar, 'Concavaefolia' was present in The Hague in the 1930s. The tree is not known to have been introduced to Australia or New Zealand.

'Concavaefolia' has been included in the propagation programme (2017) of Royal Botanic Garden Edinburgh.

== Notable trees ==
A specimen stood till 2017 (girth 2.8 m) in East Preston Street Cemetery, Edinburgh, before succumbing to DED. A second, decayed old tree in Warriston Cemetery, Edinburgh, is the remains (2019) of an Ulmus glabra 'Horizontalis' grafted at 2 m on a stock of 'Concavaefolia'. (Note: By the west wall, middle level, of Warriston Cemetery, Edinburgh .) The stock, now 3 m in girth (2016), flushes before the scion on a few ascending branches and bole shoots. It produces no suckers.

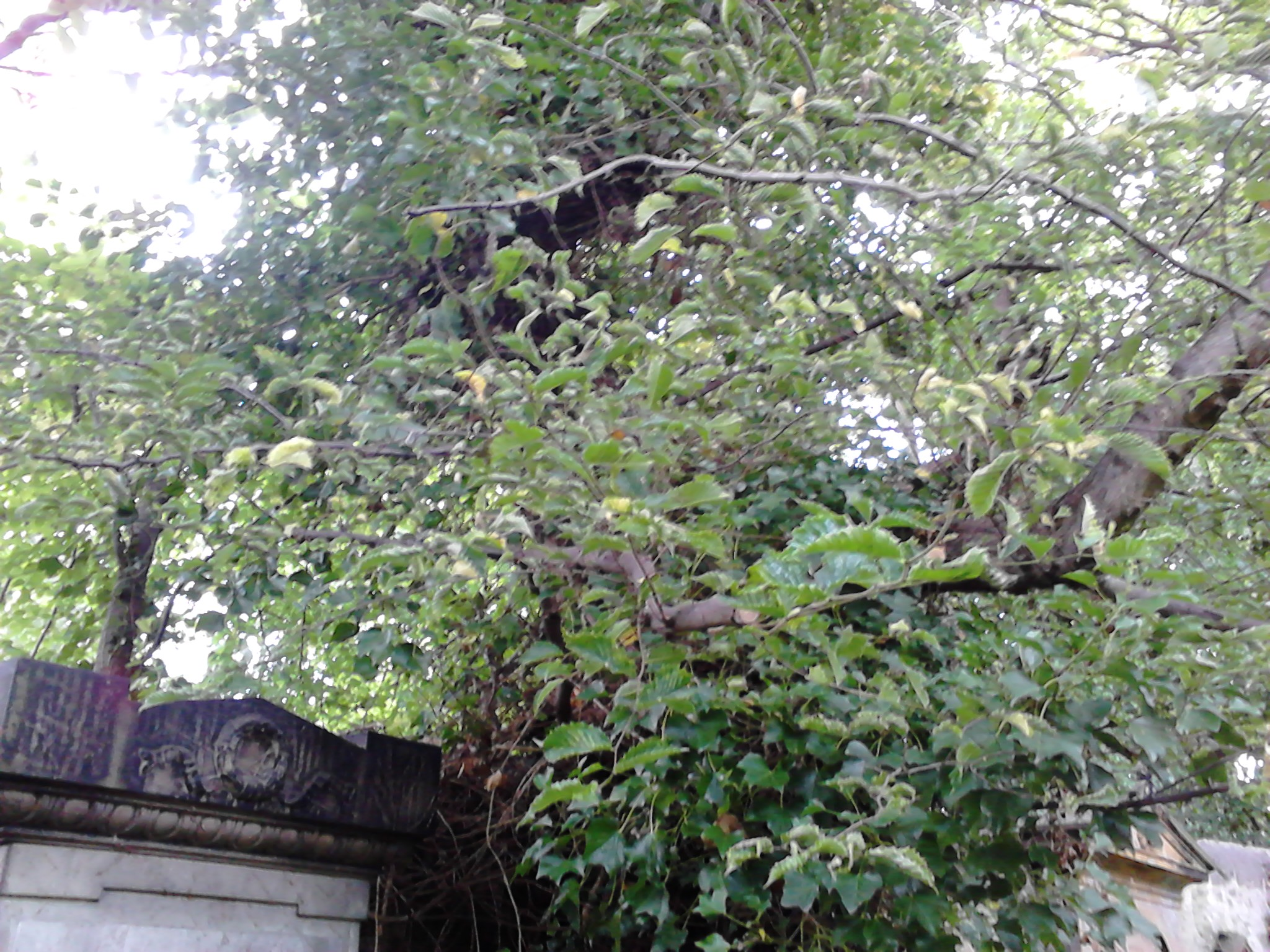
Bole-shoots of 'Concavaefolia', Warriston Cemetery, Edinburgh

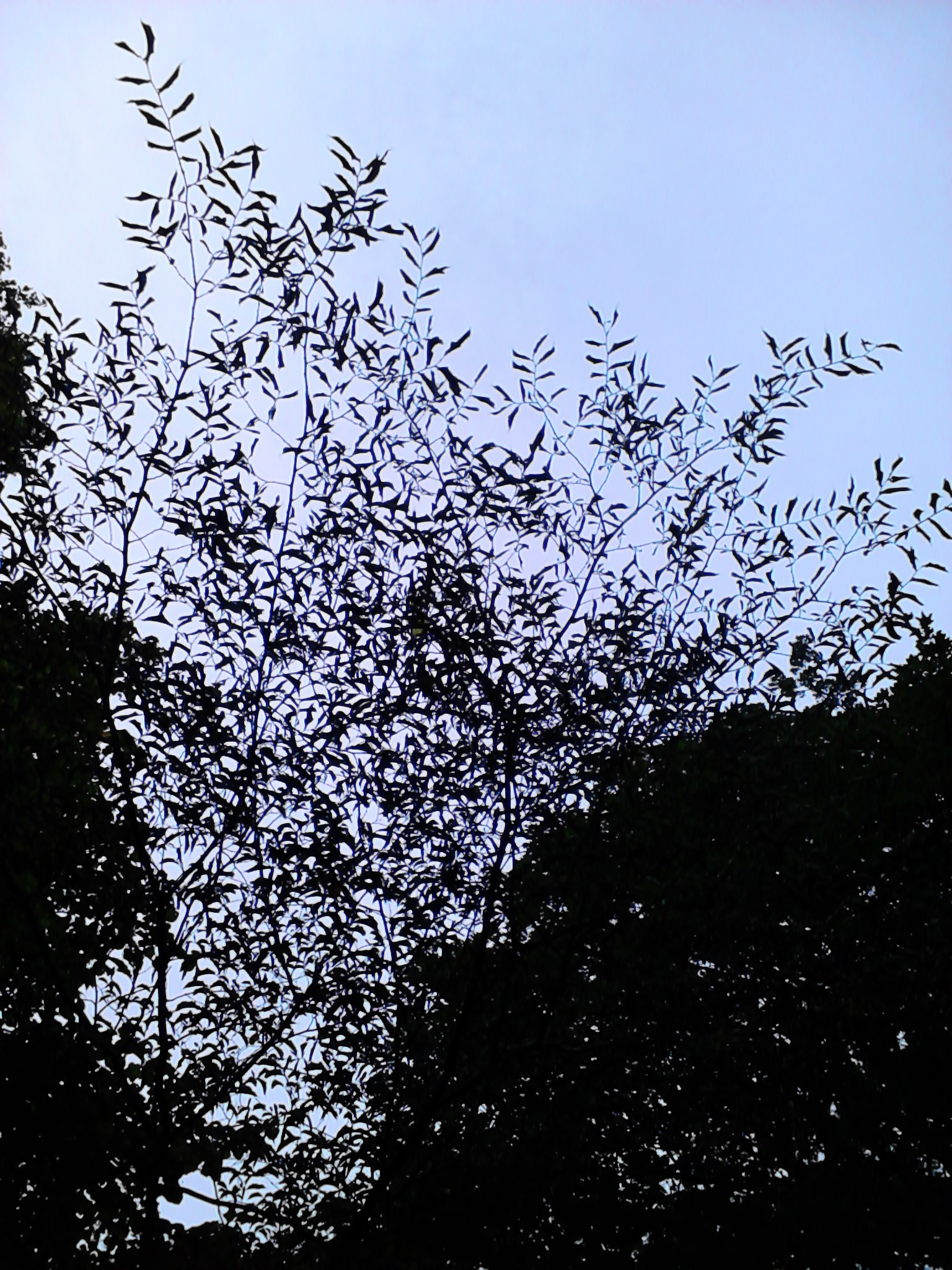
'Concavaefolia' foliage silhouette, Warriston Cemetery

== Synonymy ==
- Ulmus campestris L. cucullata Hort.
- Ulmus montana cucullata: van Houtte
- Ulmus scabra Mill. [:glabra Huds.] var. concavaefolia.
