= Ulmus minor 'Webbiana' =

Elm cultivar

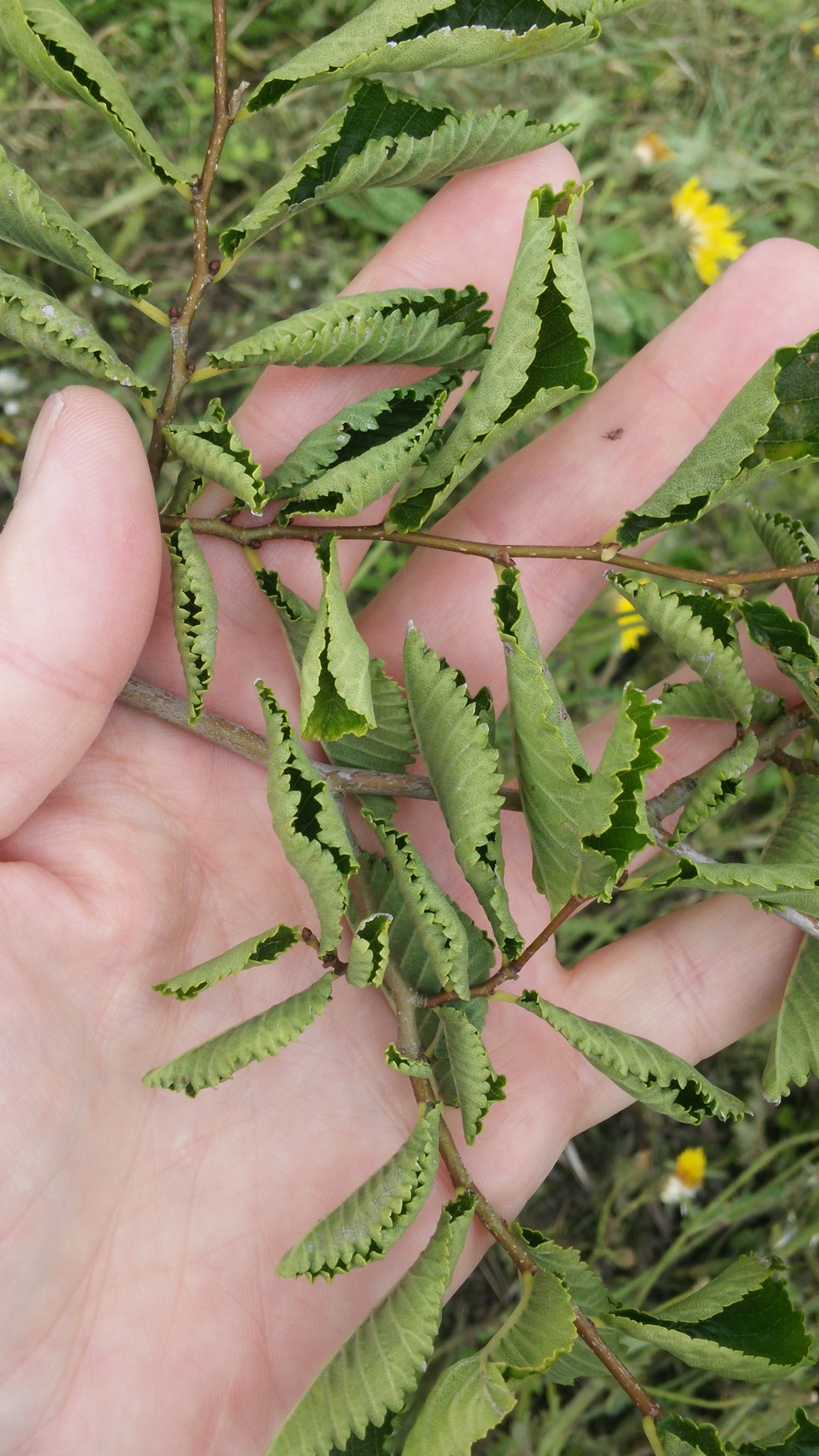
- 'Webbiana' at Grange Farm Arboretum
- Species: Ulmus minor
- Cultivar: 'Webbiana'
- Origin: England

The Field Elm cultivar Ulmus minor 'Webbiana', or Webb's curly-leaf elm, distinguished by its unusual leaves that fold upwards longitudinally, was said to have been raised at Lee's Nursery, Hammersmith, London, circa 1868, and was first described in that year in The Gardener's Chronicle and The Florist and Pomologist. It was marketed by the Späth nursery of Berlin in the late 19th and early 20th centuries as U. campestris Webbiana Hort., and by Louis van Houtte of Ghent as U. campestris crispa (Webbiana). Henry thought 'Webbiana' a form of Cornish Elm, adding (presumably with Petzold and Kirchner's 1864 description of Loudon's var. concavaefolia in mind) that it "seems to be identical with the insufficiently described U. campestris var. concavaefolia Loudon" – a view repeated by Krüssmann.

Green suggested that 'Webbiana' was "possibly to be placed with U. × hollandica". Herbarium leaf-specimens, however, show a clone with a long petiole and a 'Stricta'-type leaf curled or folded longitudinally, consistently labelled 'Webbiana' and identified as a form of Field Elm, some adding its former name U. foliacea Gilib. [: U. minor Mill.] 'Viscosa'. Krüssmann confirmed it as a field elm cultivar.

Not to be confused with the wych elm cultivar with longitudinally up-curling leaves, U. glabra 'Concavaefolia'.

== Description ==
Petzold and Kirchner in Arboretum Muscaviense (1864) described the leaves of their Ulmus campestris concavaefolia (Loudon), as "short and rounded, dark green above and whitish green below, more or less concave, that is, curling upwards at the edges so that the pale underside is more prominent than the darker upper" – a description, as Henry noted, that exactly matches 'Webbiana'. 'Webbiana', as described by Henry (1913), is "pyramidal in habit, with ascending branches and sparse foliage. The leaves are folded longitudinally, so that most of the upper surface is concealed", but are "in other respects similar to those of var. stricta". Späth's 1903 catalogue said it had "small roundish leaves". The Ellwanger and Barry Nursery of Rochester, New York, described it as "a handsome variety, with small curled leaves". Bean (1936) described it as "columnar in habit". The Royal Victoria Park, Bath, where there was a specimen, described 'Webbiana' in 1905 as "an elegant tree". The reddish seed is on the notch of the samara.

== Etymology ==
The origin of the epithet is obscure, but may commemorate Philip Barker Webb, an English botanist of the early 19th century.

== Pests and diseases ==
The tree is not known to have any significant resistance to Dutch elm disease.

== Cultivation ==
Two 'Webbiana' were planted at Kew Gardens in 1871. One tree was planted in 1899 as U. campestris webbiana at the Dominion Arboretum, Ottawa, Canada. 'Webbiana' and an Ulmus campestris concavaefolia were listed separately at the Royal Victoria Park, Bath (1905). The tree continued in cultivation in continental Europe, appearing on the lists of the Hesse Nursery of Weener, Germany, to the 1930s. It was present in The Hague in that decade. It was introduced to the USA in the late 19th century, appearing in the catalogues of the Mount Hope Nursery (also known as Ellwanger and Barry) of Rochester, New York, and to New Zealand.

At least two specimens are known to survive, one in the United States and one in the UK, the latter treated as a hedging plant to avoid the attentions of the Scolytus beetles that act as vectors of Dutch elm disease. The tree remains in cultivation in Poland, where it has been propagated from the last surviving specimen in the country, in Sanniki, believed to have been supplied by the former nursery at Podzamcze, Masovian Voivodeship, which sold 'Webbiana' as late as 1937.

== Notable trees ==
"A very fine specimen of this distinct variety" stood in the grounds of Westonbirt House, Gloucestershire, 80 feet (24 m) high and 9.8 feet (3.0 m) in by the 1920s.

== Synonymy ==
- ? U. campestris var. concavaefolia Loudon: Henry; Krüssmann
- U. foliacea Gilib. 'Viscosa': Wageningen Arboretum

== Accessions ==
=== North America ===
- Arnold Arboretum, US. Acc. no. 761–80

=== Europe ===
- Grange Farm Arboretum, Lincolnshire, UK. Acc. no. 1138.
- Wakehurst Place Garden Wakehurst Place, UK. Acc. no. 1879–21052 (as U. carpinifolia f. webbriana [sic])

== Nurseries ==
=== North America ===
None known

=== Europe ===
- Szkółki Konieczko , Gogolin, Poland.
- Szkółka Krzewów Ozdobnych , Bielsko-Biała, Poland.
- Szkółka Drzew i Krzewów Ozdobnych BÓR , Sędziszów, Poland.
