= Ulmus glabra 'Corylifolia Purpurea' =

Elm cultivar

- Species: Ulmus glabra
- Cultivar: 'Corylifolia Purpurea'
- Origin: Europe

The Wych Elm cultivar Ulmus glabra 'Corylifolia Purpurea' was raised from seed of 'Purpurea' and described as U. campestris corylifolia purpurea by Pynaert in 1879. An U. campestris corylifolia purpurea was distributed by the Späth nursery of Berlin in the late 19th and early 20th centuries. The Hesse Nursery of Weener, Germany, corrected the U. campestris corylifolia purpurea of their 1930s' lists to U. glabra Huds. corylifolia purpurea by the 1950s. Green listed 'Corylifolia Purpurea' as a form of U. glabra.

== Description ==
According to Pynaert, 'Corylifolia Purpurea' had large purplish leaves resembling those of Hazel, with the purple colour persisting into autumn on outer branchlets.

== Pests and diseases ==
See under Ulmus glabra.

== Cultivation ==
No specimens are known to survive. One tree obtained from the Späth nursery in Berlin was planted in 1893 at the Dominion Arboretum, Ottawa, Canada. Introduced to the USA, U. campestris var. corylifolia purpurea, "Purple filbert-leaved elm", was marketed by the Ellwanger & Barry and Perry nurseries of Rochester, N.Y., from the late 19th century, and by Klehms' of Arlington Heights, Illinois, in the early 20th. Three specimens were supplied by Späth to the Royal Botanic Garden Edinburgh in 1902 as U. campestris 'Corylifolia purpurea', and may survive in Edinburgh as it was the practice of the Garden to distribute trees about the city (viz. the Wentworth Elm). A specimen obtained from Späth stood in the Ryston Hall arboretum, Norfolk, in the early 20th century.

U. glabra occasionally produces purple-flushed new leaves. An elm in the gardens of the Hedvig Eleonora Church, Östermalm, Stockholm, incorrectly listed as U. procera 'Purpurea', appears in form, fruit and foliage to be a wych elm with a purple new leaves (possibly the cultivar 'Atropurprea'). A similarly misnamed 'Purple English Elm' remains in cultivation in Estonia.

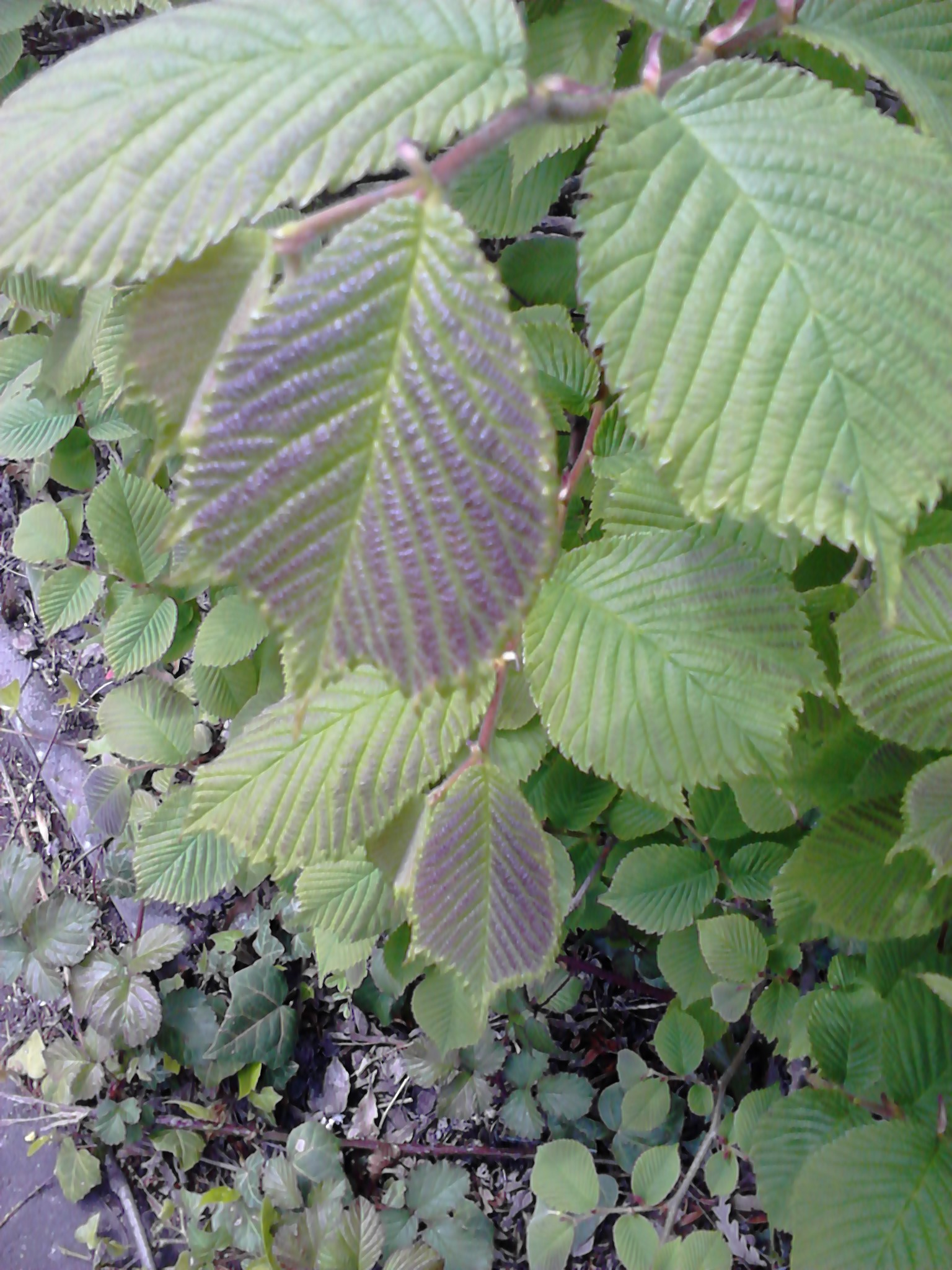
Purple-flushing wych leaves, Edinburgh

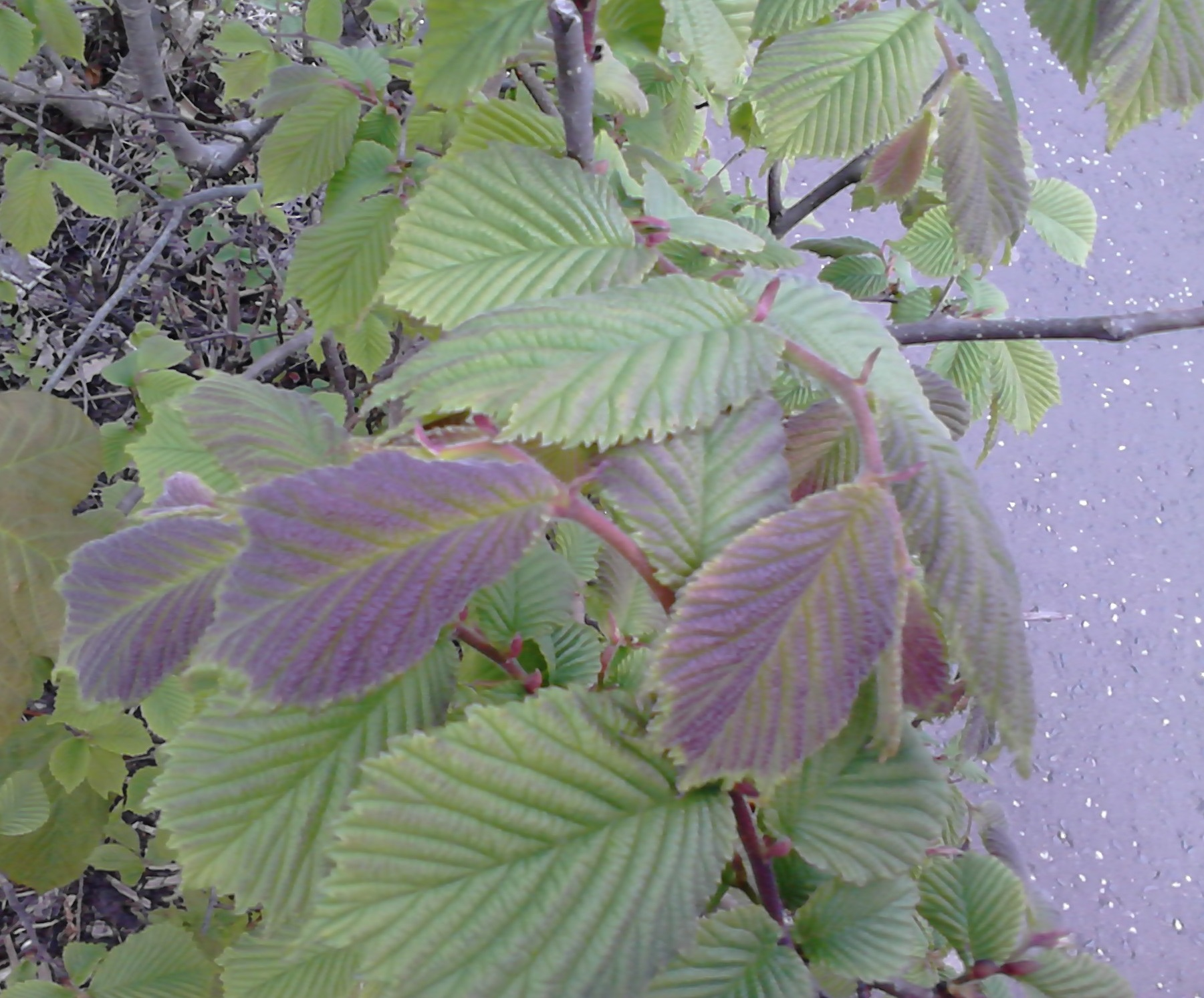

== Synonymy ==
- Ulmus scabra purpurea corylifolia: Dieck (Zöschen, Germany), Haupt-catalog der Obst- und gehölzbaumschulen des ritterguts Zöschen bei Merseburg 1885, p. 82.
