= Ulmus minor 'Purpurascens' =

Elm cultivar

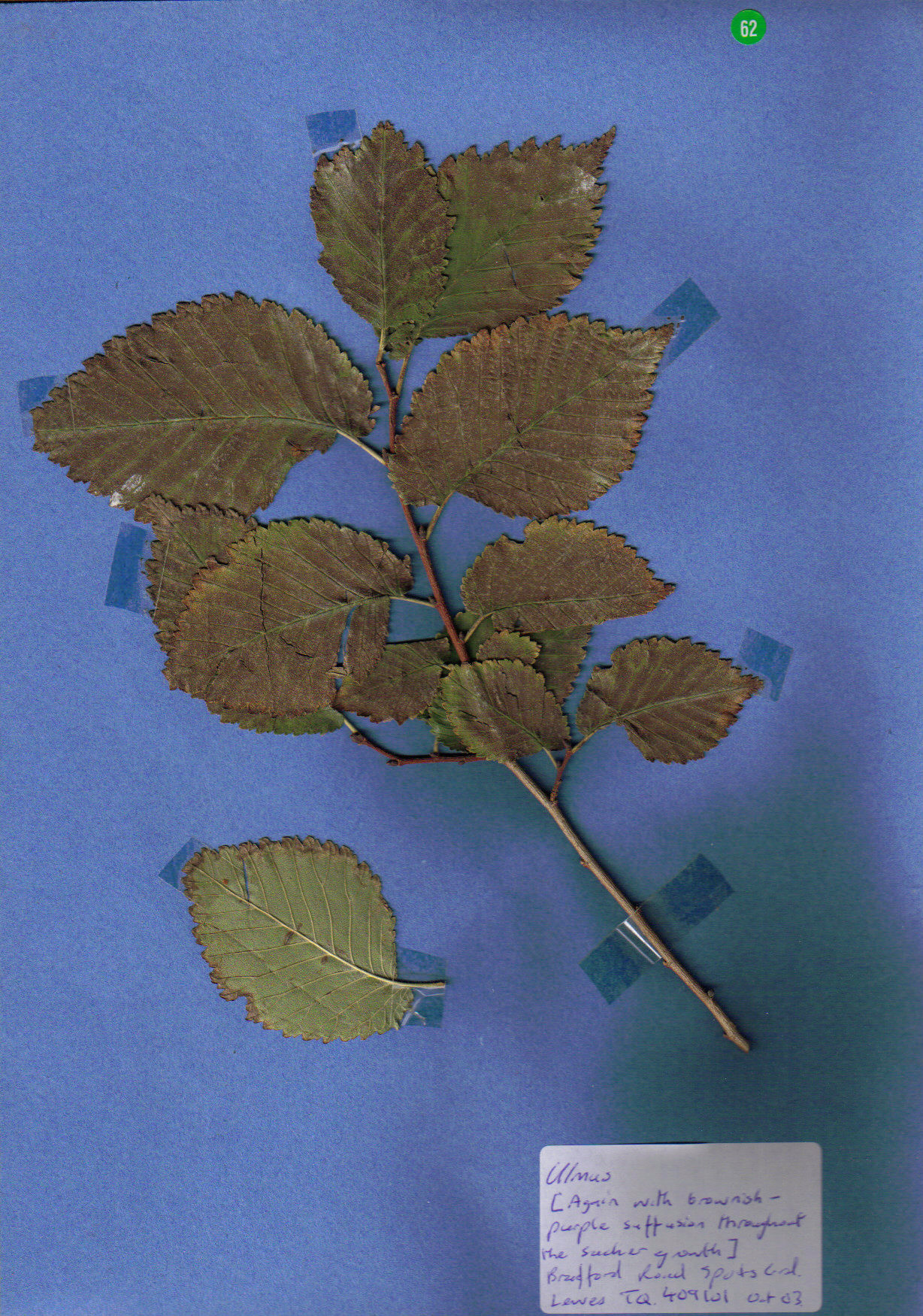
- 'Purpurascens' foliage, Lewes, UK, 2007
- Species: Ulmus minor
- Cultivar: 'Purpurascens'
- Origin: Europe

The Field Elm cultivar Ulmus minor 'Purpurascens' was listed by Lavallée in Arboretum Segrezianum (1877) as U. campestris var. purpurascens (purpurea), but without description, and later by Schneider in Illustriertes Handbuch der Laubholzkunde (1904). (Note: Henry (1913) gives Laubholzkunde 1894.) Krüssmann in Handbuch der Laubgehölze (1962) identified it as a cultivar.

Schneider, Henry, and Green believed the cultivar 'Myrtifolia Purpurea', which was also first listed in 1877, a synonym of U minor 'Purpurascens'.

== Description ==
The tree has small leaves approximately 25 mm long, rough above, downy beneath, tinged with purple when young, but turning dark green later. The twigs are downy. Green noted that the tree usually remains small.

== Pests and diseases ==
See under Ulmus minor.

== Cultivation ==
A grafted tree at Kew Gardens labelled U. campestris var. purpurascens, planted in 1885, was 20 ft tall by 1912. (For specimens supplied by the Späth nursery as U. campestris myrtifolia purpurea, see 'Myrtifolia Purpurea'.)

== Notable trees ==
Three trees survive in Hove, one of them the UK champion (see 'Accessions'). Until 2018 one was misidentified as the large-leaved purple elm U. × hollandica 'Purpurascens'.

== Synonymy ==
- Ulmus myrtifolia purpurea (?): Louis de Smet , (Ghent, Belgium), Catalogue 10, p. 59, 1877.

== Accessions ==
Europe

- Brighton & Hove City Council, UK, NCCPG Elm Collection. Cottesmore St. Mary School, Hove (1 tree, National Champion, 18 m high, 51 cm d.b.h. in 1993); Brighton & Hove Prep School, Radinden Manor Rd, Hove (1 tree); Davigdor Road, Hove (1 tree).
