= Ulmus 'Purpurea' =

Elm cultivar

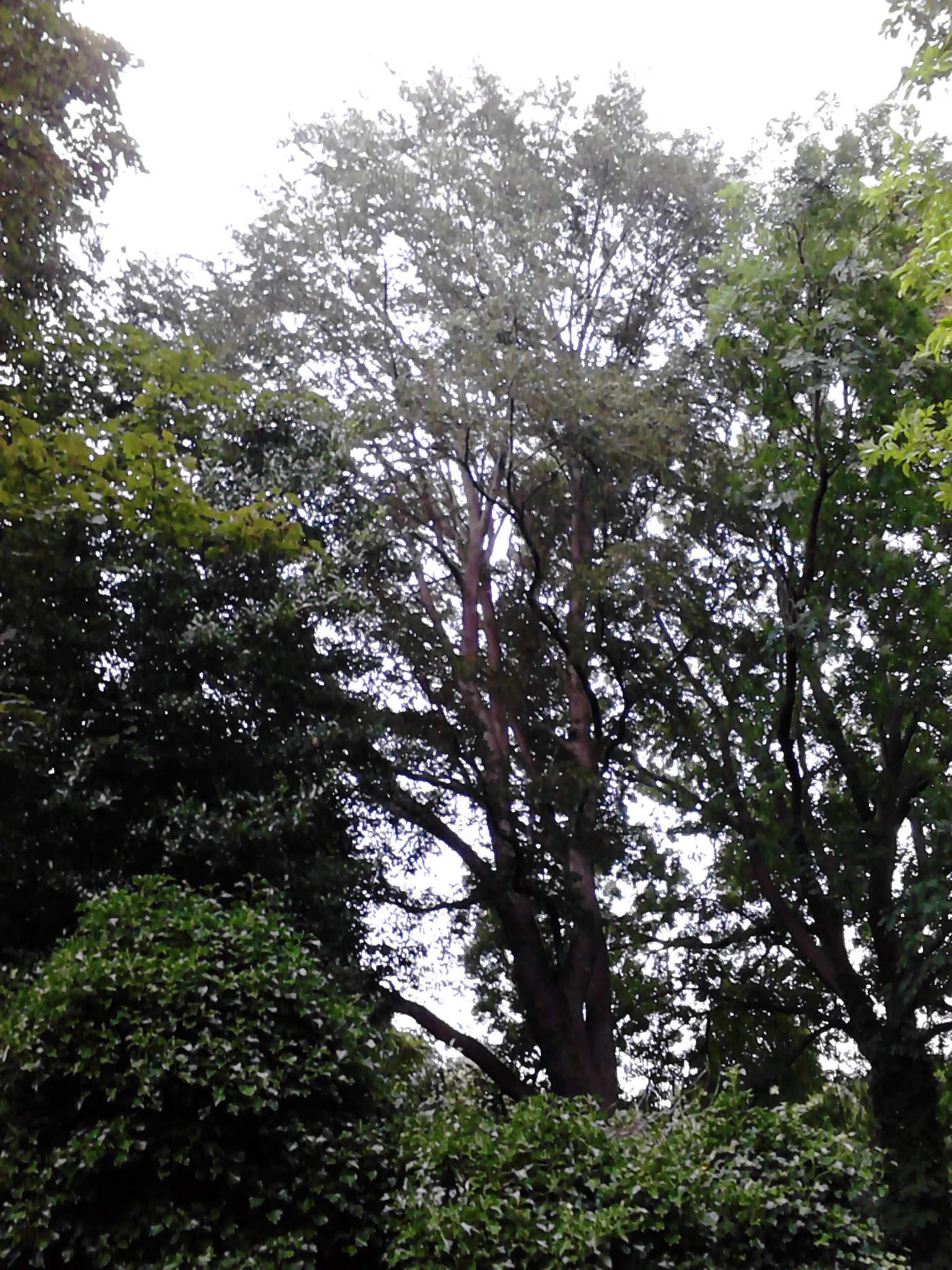
- 'Purpurea', Warriston Cemetery, Edinburgh
- Genus: Ulmus
- Cultivar: 'Purpurea'
- Origin: Europe

The elm cultivar Ulmus 'Purpurea', the purple-leaved elm, was listed and described as Ulmus Stricta Purpurea, the 'Upright Purpled-leaved Elm', by John Frederick Wood, F.H.S., in The Midland Florist and Suburban Horticulturist (1851), as Ulmus purpurea Hort. by Wesmael (1863), and as Ulmus campestris var. purpurea, syn. Ulmus purpurea Hort. by Petzold and Kirchner in Arboretum Muscaviense (1864). Koch's description followed (1872), the various descriptions appearing to tally. Henry (1913) noted that the Ulmus campestris var. purpurea Petz. & Kirchn. grown at Kew as U. montana var. purpurea was "probably of hybrid origin", Ulmus montana being used at the time both for wych elm cultivars and for some of the U. × hollandica group. His description of Kew's U. montana var. purpurea matches that of the commonly-planted 'Purpurea' of the 20th century. His discussion of it (1913) under U. campestris, however, his name for English Elm, may be the reason why 'Purpurea' is sometimes erroneously called U. procera 'Purpurea' (as in USA and Sweden ('Cultivation' and 'Accessions').

The fact that 'Purpurea' occasionally produces root-suckers confirms a hybrid origin with some U. minor component. F. J. Fontaine (1968) conjectured U. glabra × U. minor 'Stricta' and placed the tree in the U. × hollandica group under the name U. × hollandica 'Purpurascens', a name accepted by Royal Botanic Gardens Edinburgh and in Australian publications. Hillier preferred U. × hollandica 'Purpurea', conjecturing 'Sarniensis' in its parentage. The samarae, leaves and the habit of 'Purpurea' appear to support this conjecture.

See also 'Atropurpurea', possibly synonymous, raised by the Späth nursery in Berlin c.1881 and sometimes classed as a wych cultivar.

Wych elm itself occasionally produces red- or purple-flushed new leaves, the 19th century variety 'Corylifolia Purpurea' perhaps being an example. There is also a small-leaved elm U. minor 'Purpurascens' ( = Ulmus 'Myrtifolia Purpurea'), which nurseries listed and distributed separately from U. campestris purpurea Hort..

In North America, purple-leaved elms encountered in the fall are likely to be the new hybrid Ulmus 'Frontier'.

== Description ==
Of Ulmus Stricta Purpurea Wood wrote (1851): "When young, the foliage is dark purple, in the way of the Purple Beech. As the season advances, it becomes somewhat greener, but always retains a distinct and peculiar character." The leaves of Wesmael's (1863) Ulmus purpurea Hort. were a "characteristic bronzy green" (canopy new leaves). Those of Petzold and Kirchner's (1864) Ulmus campestris var. purpurea, syn. Ulmus purpurea Hort., "emerged dark purple, later becoming more green, but always of a very dark, reddish-green which is peculiar". Koch's U. purpurea (1872) had "leaves purple when young, changing to dark green".

'Purpurea' grows to > 25 m in height, and is short-trunked with open, straggling, ascending branches. The leaf-buds are long, sharply pointed and dark purple, on shoots of the same colour. The flowers, too, emerge a uniform dark purple. The fruit, tinged purple over the seed, is intermediate between U. glabra and U. minor. The leaves, which are slightly folded, have a brief purplish-green flush in spring. The new leaves of lower bole-shoots and of suckers are pure dark purple, without any green. After the spring flush, the leaves become olive green then darken in the summer. Their underside is paler, so that, with their increasing fold as the year progresses, the late-summer foliage has a greyish look. The bark of younger trees has a reddish-brown hue.

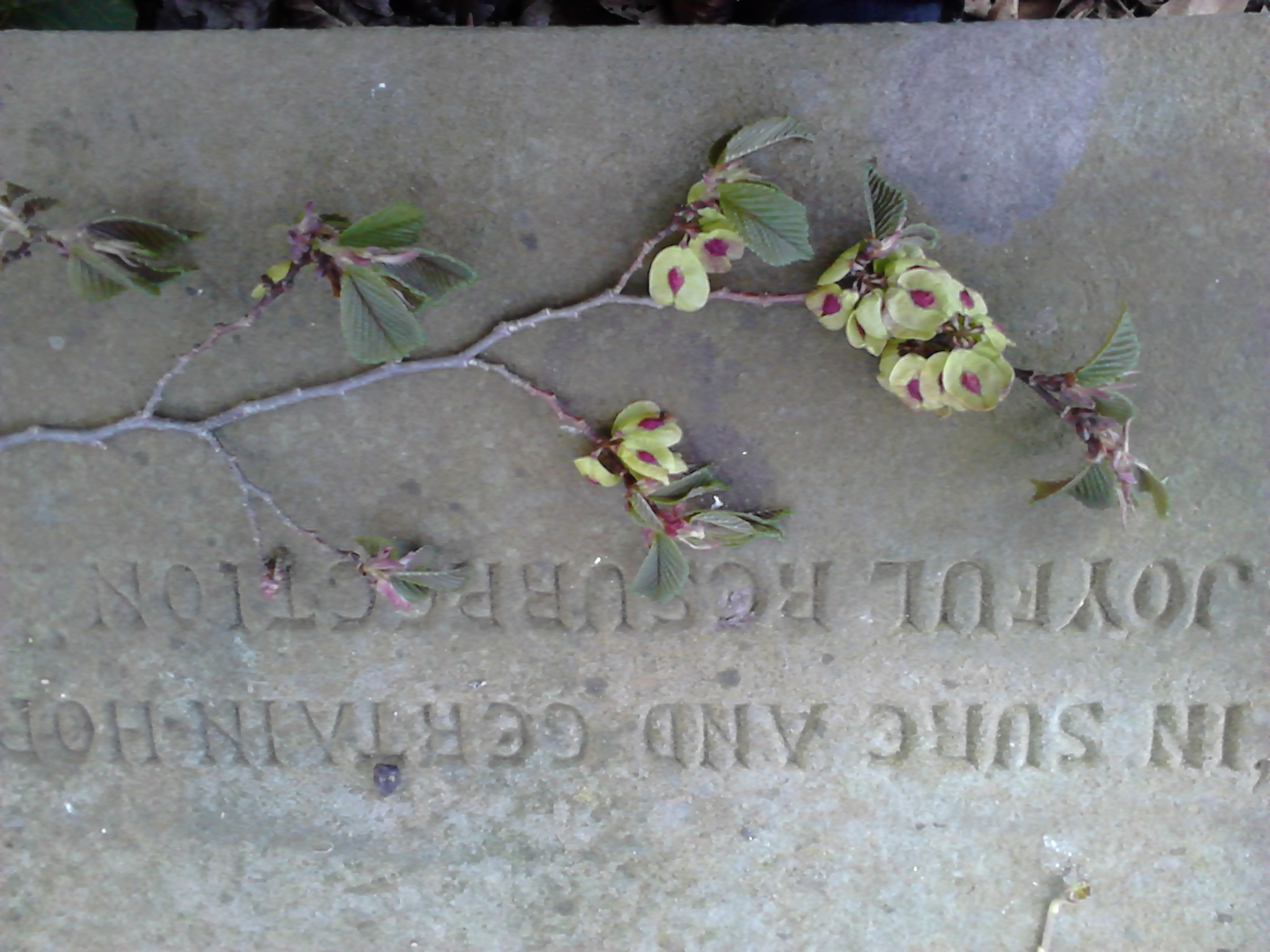
'Purpurea' samarae, confirming hybridity

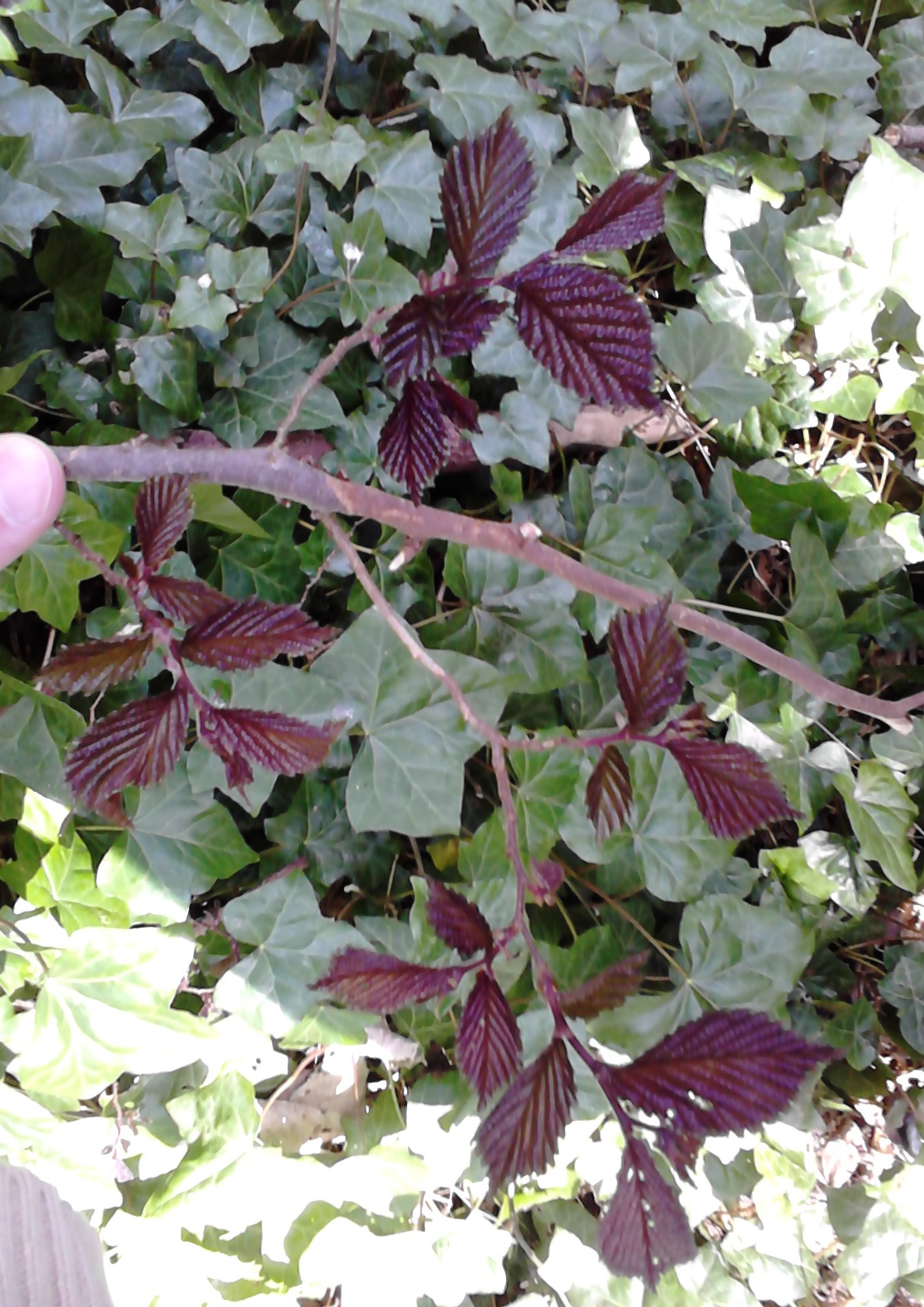
New bole-shoots

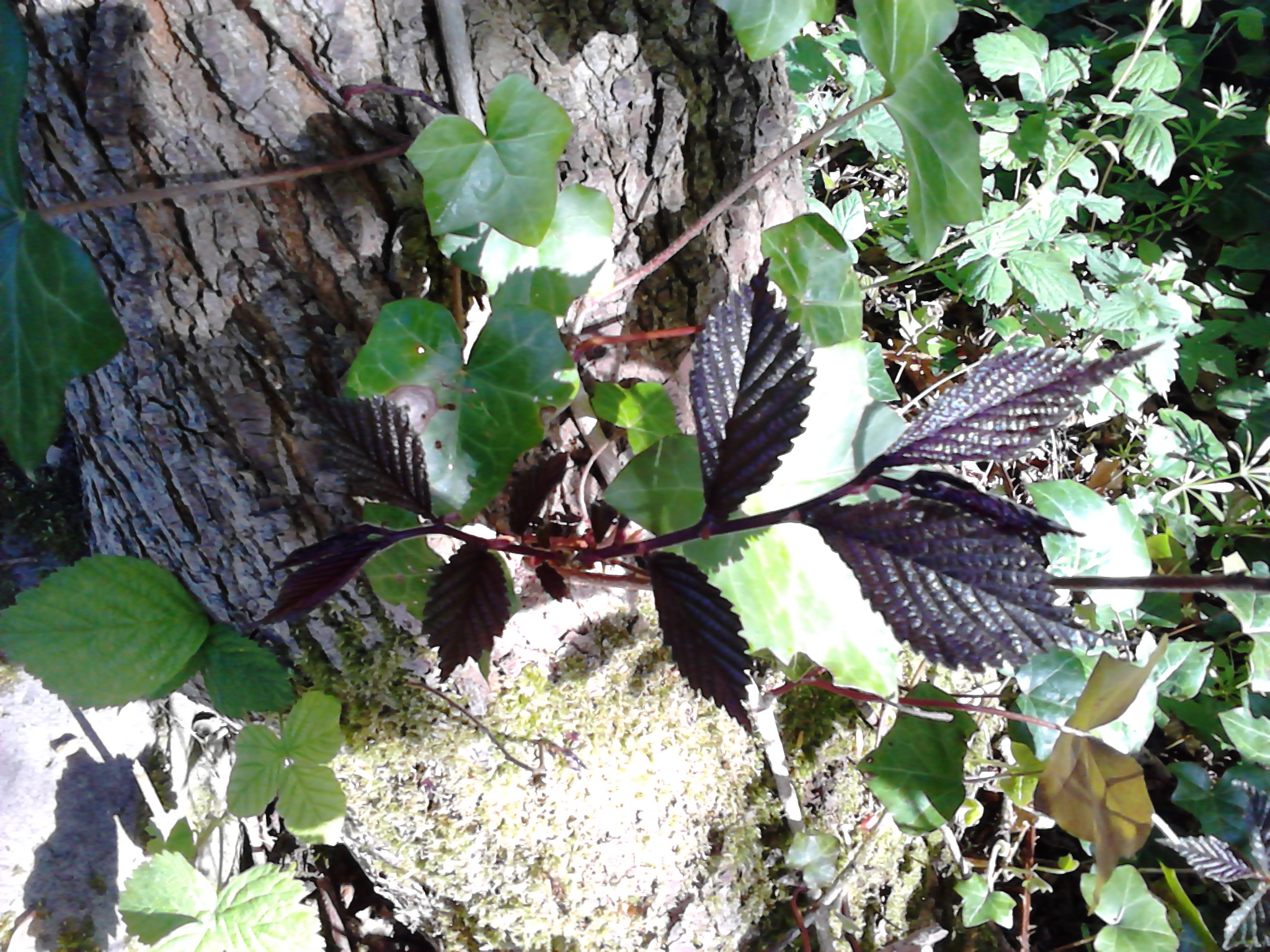
Low bole-shoots

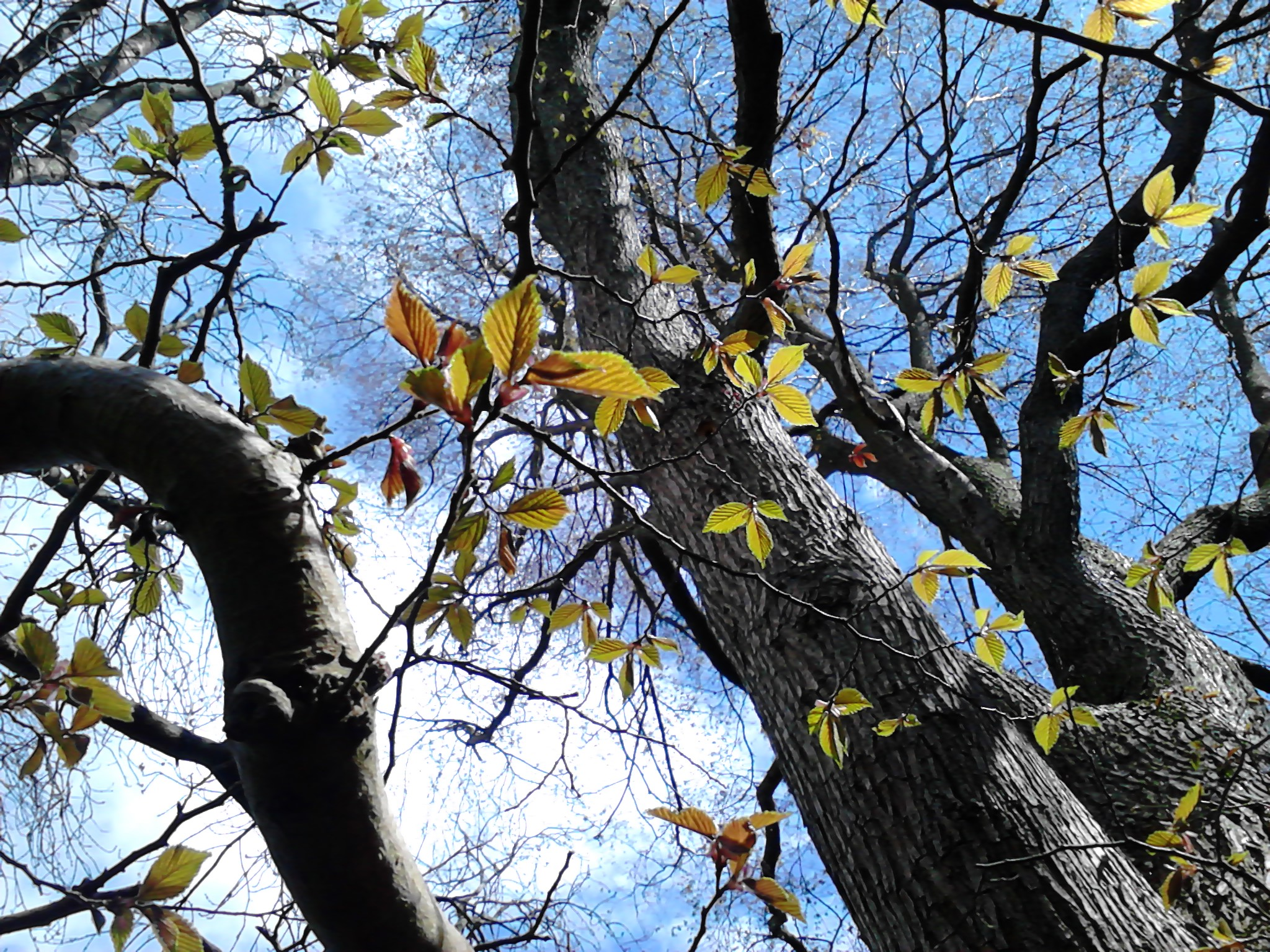
New canopy-leaves

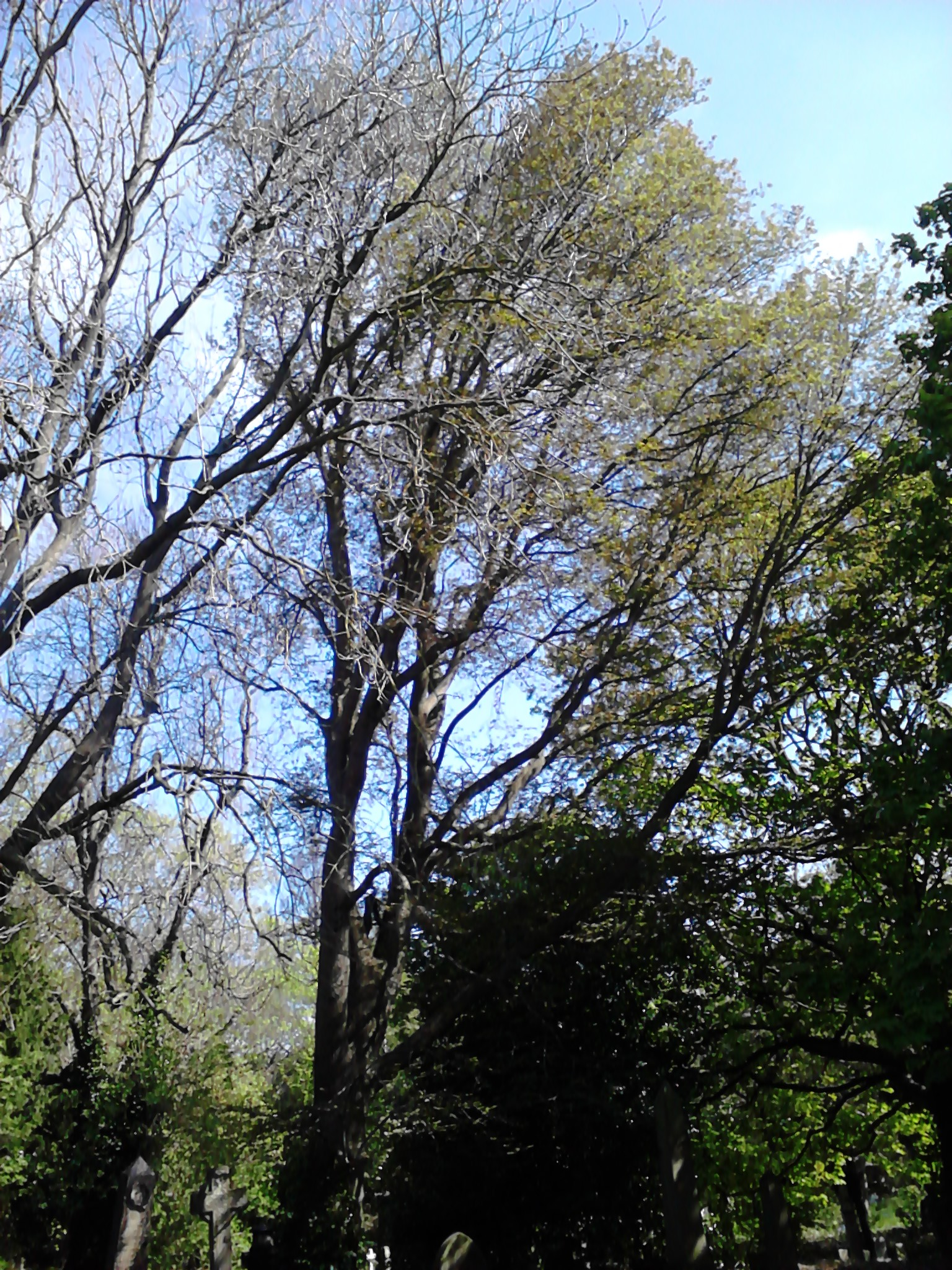
Olive green canopy, May

Summer foliage, Brighton

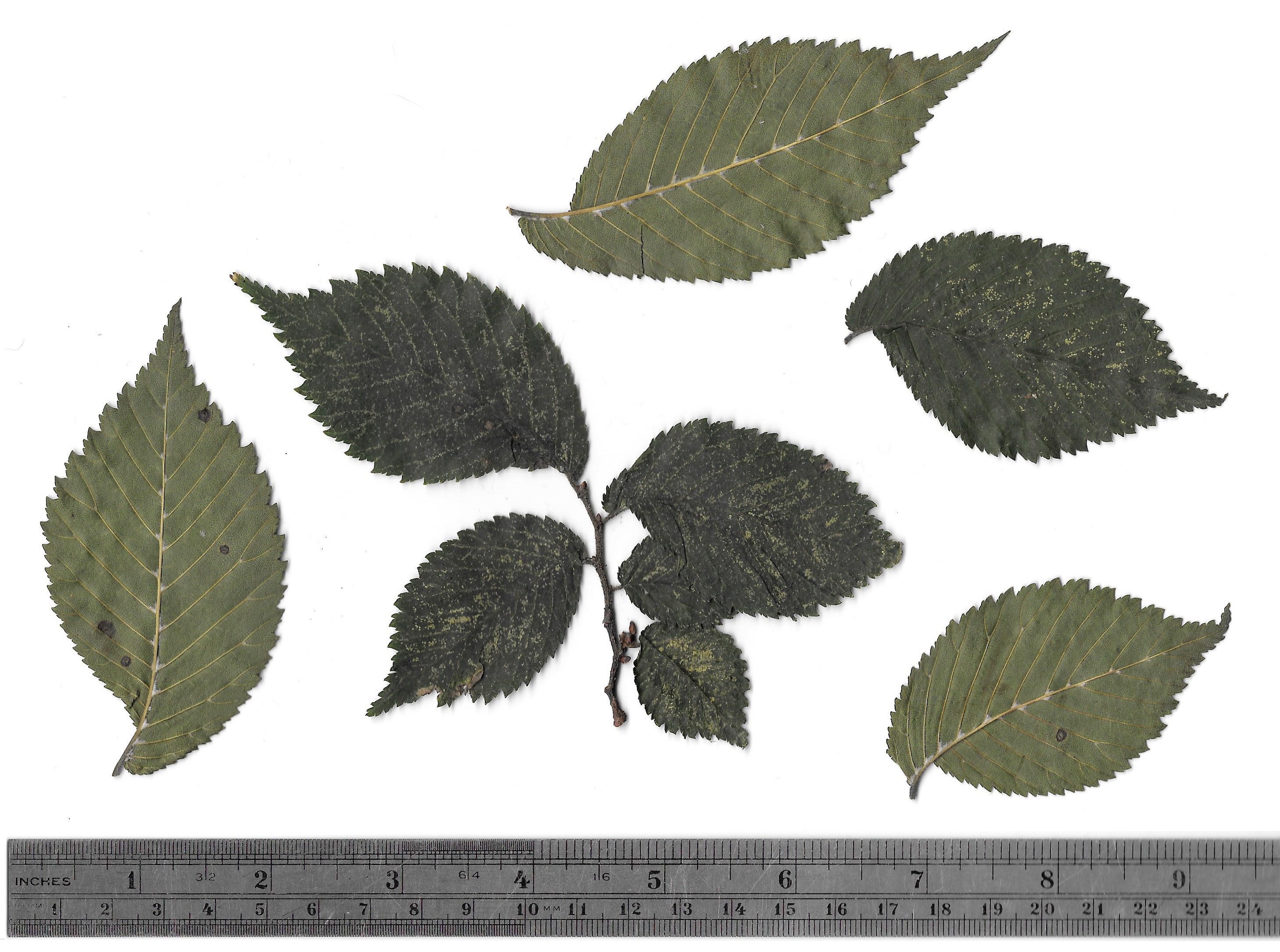
Pressed leaves, August

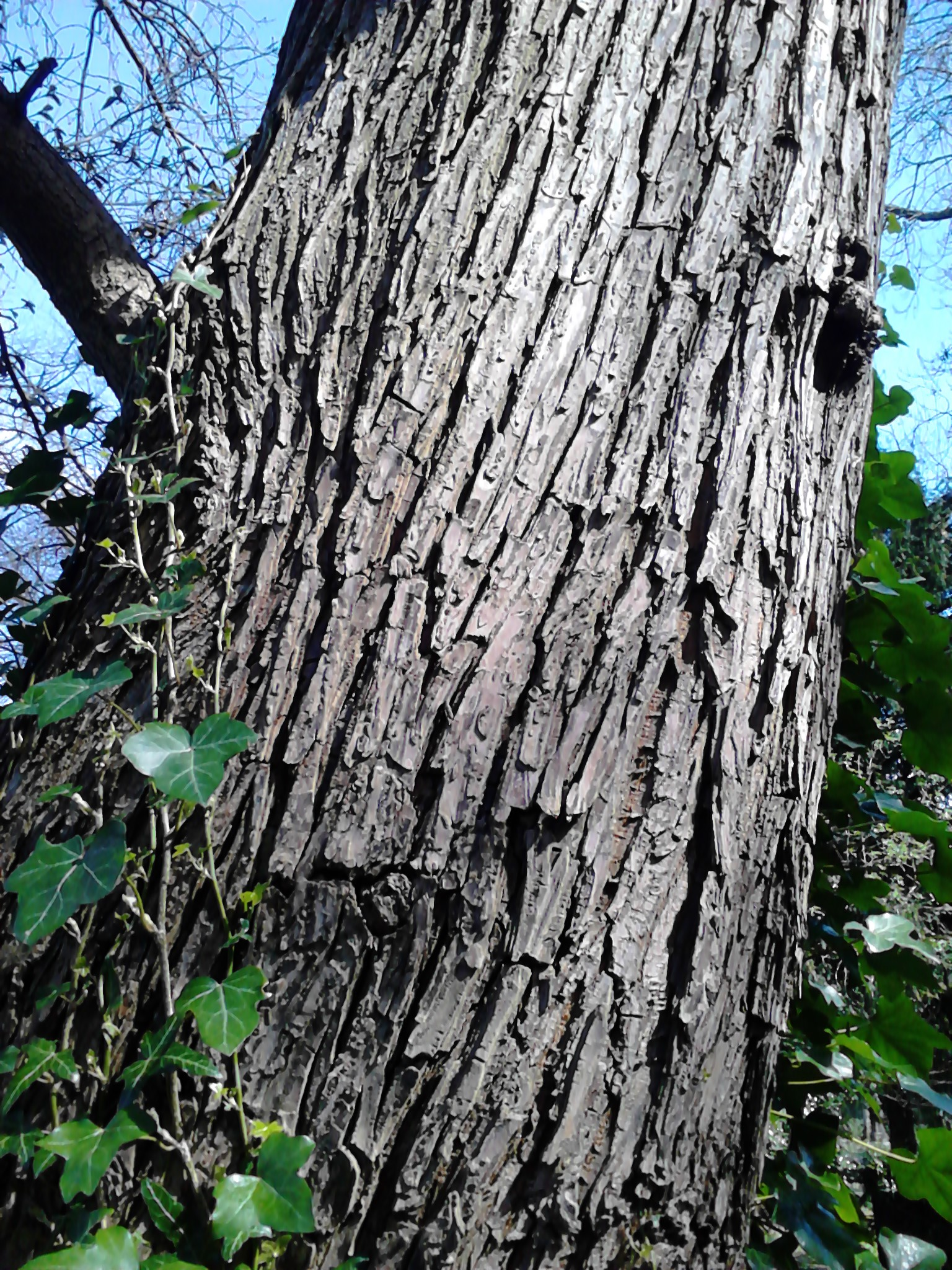
Bark

== Pests and diseases ==
The tree is susceptible to Dutch elm disease.

== Cultivation ==
'Purpurea' Hort. was in cultivation in Europe from the 1860s. Later, U. × hollandica 'Purpurascens' was "produced in quantity" by nurseries in Oudenbosch, the Netherlands. It is still present in Sweden, but appears to have been rarer in cultivation in the UK; Wilkinson in his researches for Epitaph for the Elm (1978) had never seen a specimen. In 2007 the Swedish Biodiversity Centre's 'Programme for Diversity of Cultivated Plants' included 'Purpurascens' (mistakenly called Ulmus procera 'Purpurea' in Sweden) in their plant conservation programme.

Introduced to the USA in the late 1860s as Ulmus stricta purpurea, 'Purple leaved elm' was stocked by the Mount Hope Nursery (also known as Ellwanger and Barry) of Rochester, New York. An U. campestris purpurea, 'Purple-leaved English Elm', of "compact upright growth" with "leaves a purple color in May and June", appeared in the 1902 catalogue of the Bobbink and Atkins nursery, Rutherford, New Jersey, and an U. stricta purpurea, also called 'Purple-leaved English Elm', "a tree with erect branches and purplish-red leaves", in both Bobbink and Atkins' 1902 catalogue and Kelsey's 1904 catalogue, New York. An elm obtained in 1922 from H. Kohankie & Son is listed by the Morton Arboretum, Illinois, as Ulmus procera 'Purpurea', but without description. Its leaves do not flush purple. In arboretum photographs (2011) its bark and form do not appear to resemble hybrid 'Purpurea'.

In Australia cultivars by the name of U. glabra Huds. 'Purpurea', U. procera 'Purpurea' and U. purpurea appear in nursery catalogues dating from 1882; these are now believed to be synonymous with the clone in cultivation there as U. × hollandica 'Purpurascens'. 'Purpurascens' was sold by Searl's Garden Emporium, Sydney at the beginning of the 20th century and was "quite widely" planted in the south-east of the country, where it is said to tolerate dry conditions. Urban plantings include avenue specimens and scattered trees in Fawkner Park, Melbourne.

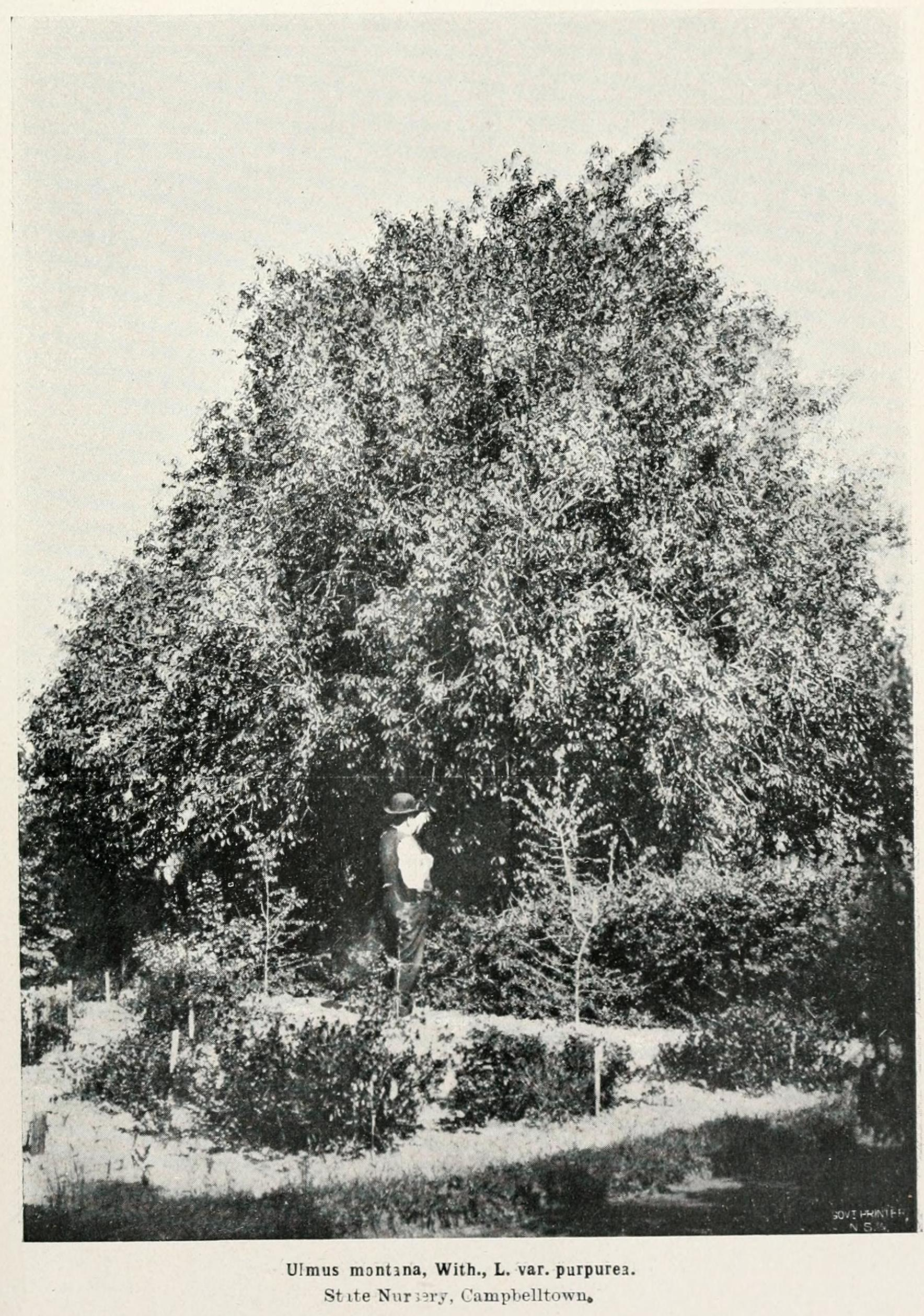
'Purpurea', State Nursery, Campbelltown, New South Wales, 1908

== Notable trees ==
A large specimen stands in Warriston Cemetery, Edinburgh (middle level). Six of the seven mature specimens growing there were felled in the 1990s; the seventh, near the east gate, remains healthy (2019) (height 20 m, bole-girth 2.2 m; labelled 03159 CEM). (Ignorance of this cultivar may have occasioned unnecessary felling: the tree's naturally upcurled, greyish foliage in late summer may be mistaken for foliage affected by Dutch elm disease.) A vigorous sucker in the cemetery has now become an established tree. In the Netherlands an old specimen, supplied by De Reebock nurseries in Oudenaarde, Belgium, stood until c.2010 in the Burgemeester Mijnlieffstraat in the town of Anna Paulowna. In Australia the Avenue of Honour at Wallan, Victoria, was planted solely with 'Purpurascens' in the early 1920s, most of which survive, and the cultivar was also included in the Avenue of Honour in Ballarat in 1918. A large old purple-flushing elm stands in the gardens of the Hedvig Eleonora Church, Östermalm, Stockholm, with foliage appearing to match the hybrid purple elms in Edinburgh and Brighton.

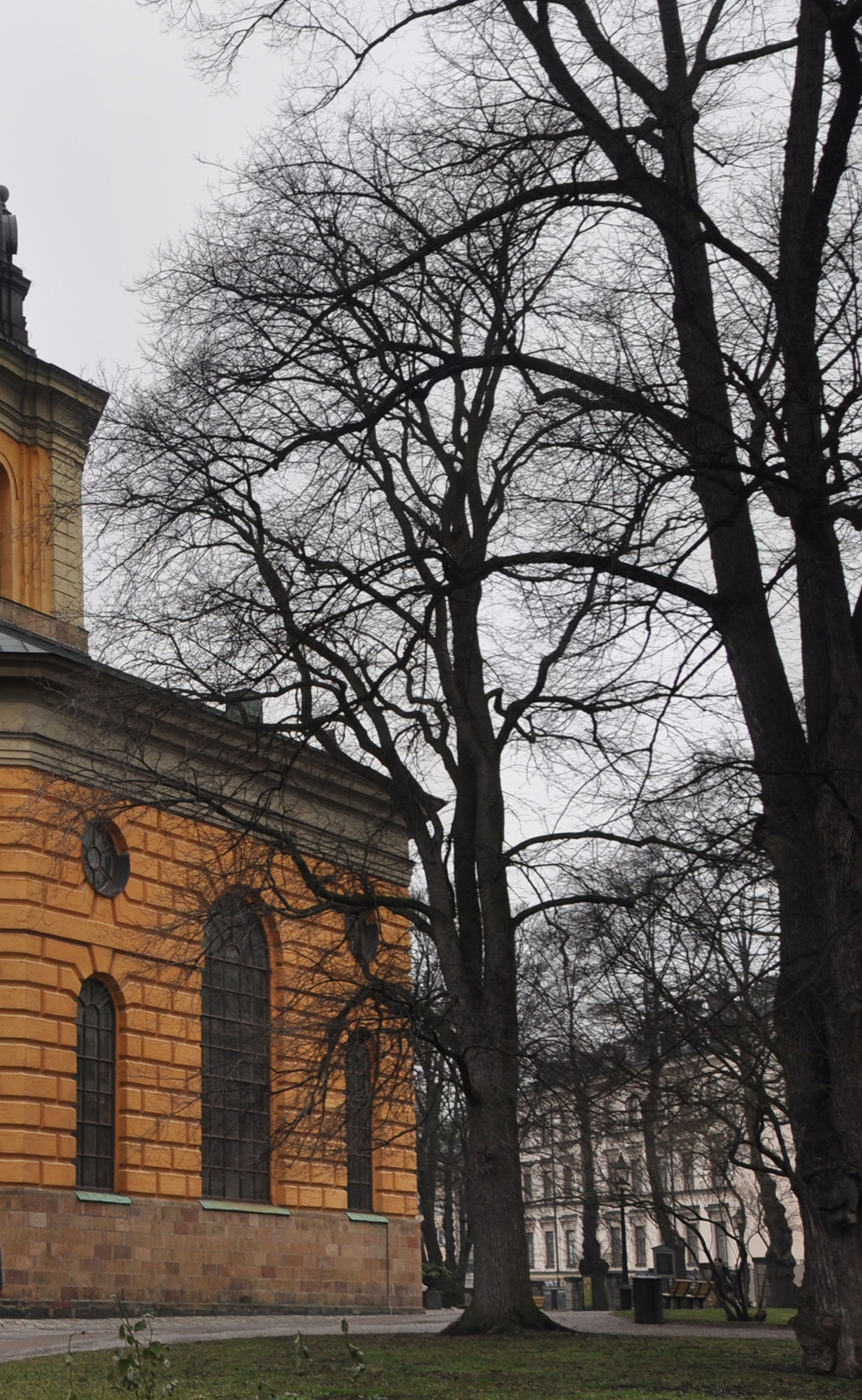
Hedvig Eleonora Church purple-leaved elm, Stockholm, 2014

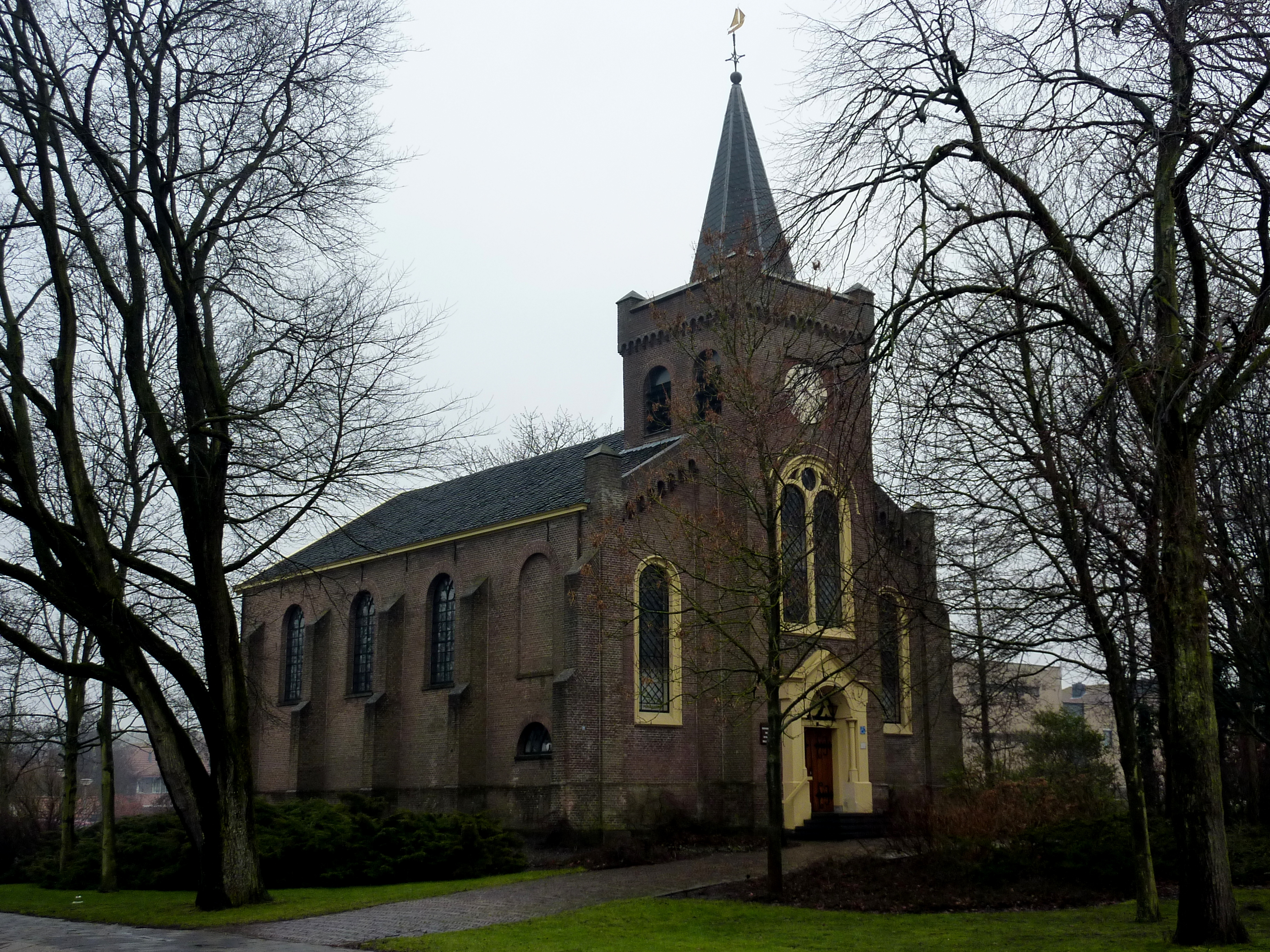
'Purpurascens' (left), Ned. Herv. Kerk, Burgemeester Mijnlieffstraat, Anna Paulowna, 2010

== Synonymy ==
- Ulmus montana (: glabra) var. atropurpurea: Elwes and Henry
- Ulmus montana (: glabra) 'Purpurea': Kew Garden list of names
- Ulmus 'Purpurea': Koch; Bean; National Elm Collection elm list
- Ulmus x hollandica 'Purpurascens': Fontaine, Dendroflora No.5 (1968)
- ?Ulmus campestris (: minor) 'Purpurea': Kirchner
- ?Ulmus procera 'Purpurea': Morton Arboretum Catalogue 2006.

== Accessions ==
=== Europe ===
- Brighton & Hove City Council, UK. NCCPG elm collection.
- Grange Farm Arboretum, Sutton St. James, Spalding, Lincolnshire, UK. As U. glabra 'Purpurea'. Acc. no. 1068.
- RBG Wakehurst Place, UK. Listed as U. glabra 'Atropurpurea'. Acc. no. 1896–1411.

=== Australasia ===
- Avenue of Honour, Wallan, Victoria, Australia.
- Avenue of Honour, Ballarat, Victoria, Australia.

=== North America ===
- Dominion Arboretum, Ottawa, Ontario, Canada. Acc. no. 2596.

== Nurseries ==
=== Europe ===
- Centrum voor Botanische Verrijking vzw, Kampenhout, Belgium (as Ulmus glabra 'Purpurea').
- Loenbaek Planteskole, Holstebro, Denmark.
- Propagation Nurseries Vermeerderingstuin Horst and Zeewolde, Netherlands
