= Ulmus 'Myrtifolia' =

Elm cultivar

- Genus: Ulmus
- Cultivar: 'Myrtifolia'
- Origin: England?

The elm cultivar Ulmus 'Myrtifolia', the Myrtle-leaved Elm, first appeared in nursery and horticultural lists in the 1830s, as Ulmus myrtifolia and Ulmus campestris myrtifolia, the name Ulmus myrtifolia Volxem being used at Kew Gardens from 1880. Lawson's nursery of Edinburgh appears to have been the earliest to list the tree. 'Myrtifolia' was listed by Nicholson in Kew Hand-List Trees & Shrubs (1896), but without description. It was later listed as a cultivar and described by Rehder in 1939 and by Krüssmann in 1962.

The specimen under this name in the Herb. Nicholson at Kew was considered by Melville to be a probable U. minor × Ulmus minor 'Plotii' hybrid.

The cultivar 'Myrtifolia Purpurea', which has larger leaves, is not related to 'Myrtifolia'.

== Description ==
'Myrtifolia' was described as having leaves ovate or rhombic-ovate to oblong-ovate, 2–5 cm long with nearly simple teeth, loosely pilose on both sides. The petiole is 2 to 4 mm long, and the samara is 12 to 15 mm long.

== Cultivation ==
A 'Mytifolia' was present in North Road, Bath in 1902. There were specimens at Arnold Arboretum in the mid-20th century, sourced in the 1920s from a tree in Cleveland, Ohio.

The tree is not known to remain in cultivation.

== Synonymy ==
- Ulmus campestris (: minor) var. myrtifolia Hort.: Nicholson, in Kew Hand-List Trees & Shrubs 2: 135, 1896.
- Ulmus buxifolia Hort.: Nicholson, Kew Hand-List Trees & Shrubs 2: 135, 1896, in synonymy.
- Ulmus procera var. myrtifolia: Bean (1934)
- Ulmus procera f. myrtifolia: Rehder (1939)
