= Ulmus 'Myrtifolia Purpurea' =

Elm cultivar

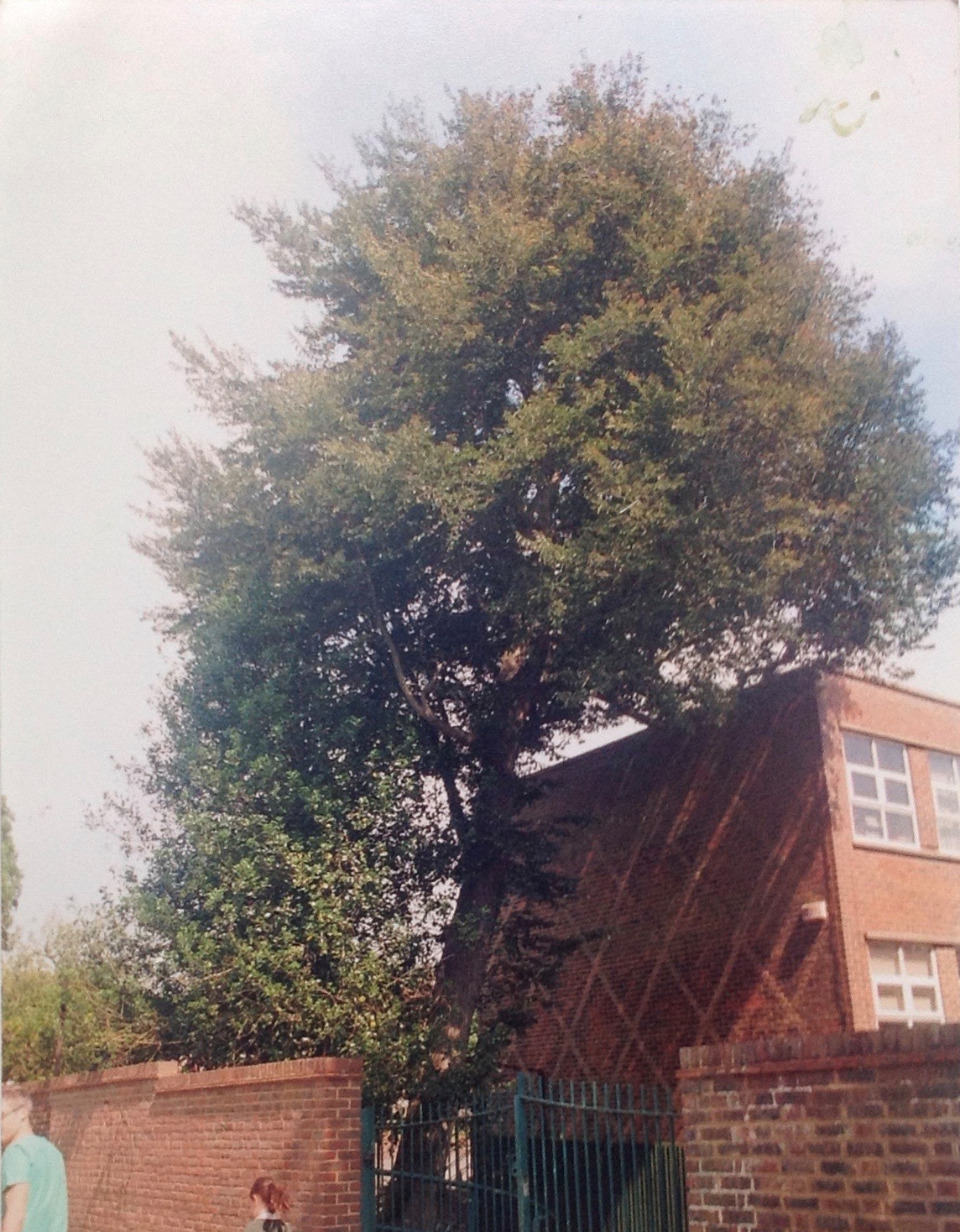
- 'Myrtifolia Purpurea' (:Ulmus minor 'Purpurascens'), Radinden Manor Road, Hove, UK
- Genus: Ulmus
- Cultivar: 'Myrtifolia Purpurea'
- Origin: Belgium

The Elm cultivar Ulmus 'Myrtifolia Purpurea', the Purple Myrtle-leaved Elm, was first mentioned by Louis de Smet of Ghent (1877) as Ulmus myrtifolia purpurea. An U. campestris myrtifolia purpurea Hort. was distributed by Louis van Houtte in the 1880s, by the Späth nursery, Berlin, in the 1890s and early 1900s, and by the Hesse Nursery, Weener, Germany, till the 1930s.

Schneider, Henry, and Green believed 'Myrtifolia Purpurea' a synonym of U. minor 'Purpurascens', which was also first listed in 1877.

The cultivar U. 'Myrtifolia' is not related to 'Myrtifolia Purpurea'.

== Description ==
The catalogue of the Späth nursery described U. campestris myrtifolia purpurea as having very small reddish leaves.

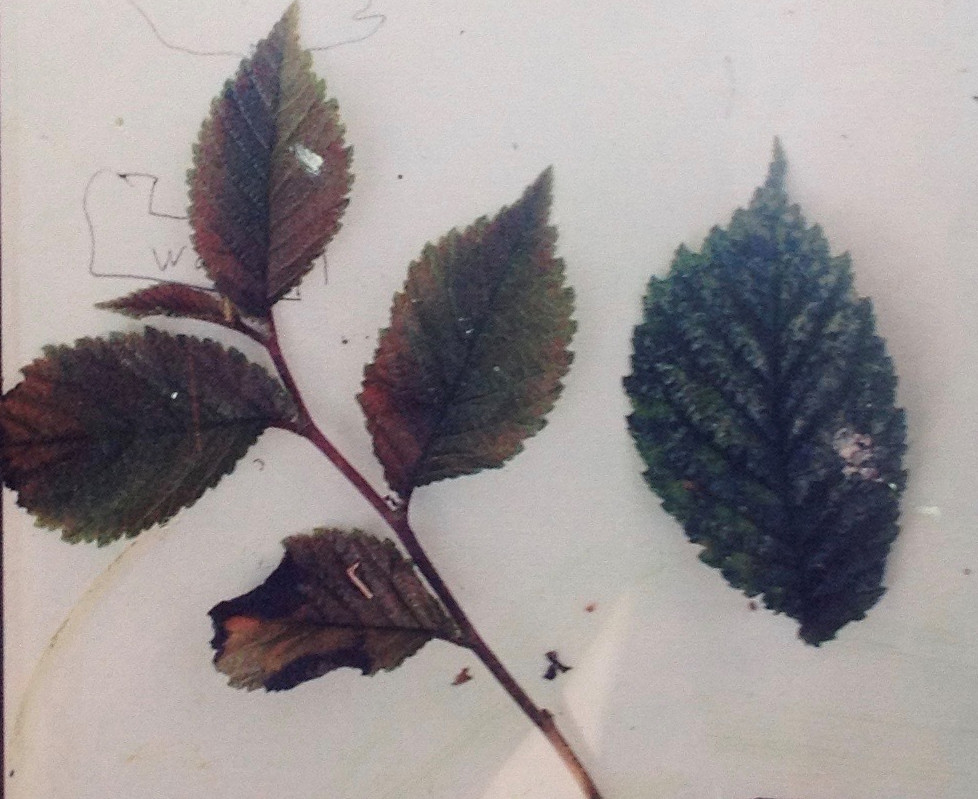
Leaves of Radinden Manor Road tree, Hove.

== Pests and diseases ==
Not known.

== Cultivation ==
'Myrtifolia Purpurea' was occasionally cultivated as an ornamental. One tree was planted in 1893, as U. campestris myrtifolia purpurea, at the Dominion Arboretum, Ottawa, Canada. Three specimens were supplied by the Späth nursery to the Royal Botanic Garden Edinburgh in 1902 as U. campestris myrtifolia purpurea, and may still exist in Edinburgh as it was the practice of the Garden to distribute trees about the city (viz. the Wentworth Elm); the current list of Living Accessions held in the Garden per se does not list the plant. U. myrtifolia purpurea, a small tree with "elegant foliage of beautiful color", appeared in the 1902 catalogue of the Bobbink and Atkins nursery, Rutherford, New Jersey, and in Kelsey's 1904 catalogue, New York.

== Notable trees ==
Three small-leaved purple-flushing elms survive in Hove, one of them the UK champion (see 'Accessions'). Until 2018 one was misidentified as the large-leaved purple elm U. × hollandica 'Purpurascens'. Of the two names for small-leaved purple-flushing elm – U. 'Myrtifolia Purpurea' and U. minor 'Purpurascens' (likely synonyms) – the former was the commoner in nursery lists.

== Accessions ==
Europe

- Brighton & Hove City Council, UK. NCCPG Elm Collection. Cottesmore St. Mary School, Hove (1 tree, National Champion, 18 m high, 51 cm d.b.h. in 1993); Brighton & Hove Prep School, Radinden Manor Rd, Hove (1 tree); Davigdor Road, Hove (1 tree).

== Synonymy ==
- U. minor 'Purpurascens': Schneider, Henry, Green.
