= Ulmus 'Atropurpurea' =

Elm cultivar

- Genus: Ulmus
- Cultivar: 'Atropurpurea'
- Origin: Germany

The elm cultivar Ulmus 'Atropurpurea' [:dark purple] was raised from seed at the Späth nursery in Berlin, Germany, circa 1881, as Ulmus montana atropurpurea, and was marketed there till the 1930s, being later classed as a cultivar by Boom. Henry (1913) included it under Ulmus montana cultivars but noted that it was "very similar to and perhaps identical with" Ulmus purpurea Hort. At Kew it was renamed U. glabra Huds. 'Atropurpurea', but Späth used U. montana both for wych elm and for some U. × hollandica hybrids, so his name does not necessarily imply a wych elm cultivar. The Hesse Nursery of Weener, Germany, however, which marketed 'Atropurpurea' in the 1950s, listed it in later years as a form of U. glabra Huds..

Photographs of the 'Atropurpurea' hedge at Wakehurst Place, England, though they show untypical 'pollard' leaves, appear to confirm that Späth's cultivar was similar to Ulmus purpurea Hort., probably the hybrid 'Purpurea' already in cultivation and in Späth's catalogues as U. campestris purpurea, which he distributed separately.

== Description ==
Späth described his 'Atropurpurea' as having dark purple emerging shoots and leaves ("the darkest and most beautiful of the purple elms"), the foliage later turning deep green. Henry noted that the leaves were folded. Bean, who had the opportunity to compare mature specimens, recorded that the purple colour of 'Atropurpurea' is more lasting in the spring than that of 'Purpurea'. Späth's description, however, was based on saplings raised in his nursery; it applies equally to saplings of the hybrid 'Purpurea', already in cultivation for at least three decades. Herbarium specimens of 'Atropurpurea' do not appear to differ from juvenile leaves of 'Purpurea'. A wych cultivar, if such 'Atropurpurea' is, would have its seed central, not marginal, in the samara (see 'Putative specimens' below).

== Pests and diseases ==
'Atropurpurea' is not known to have any resistance to Dutch elm disease.

== Cultivation ==
One specimen of U. montana atropurpurea was planted in 1896 at the Dominion Arboretum, Ottawa, Canada. Three supplied by the Späth nursery to the Royal Botanic Garden Edinburgh in 1902 as U. montana atropurpurea may survive in Edinburgh as it was the practice of the Garden to distribute trees about the city (viz. the Wentworth Elm); the current list of Living Accessions held in the Garden per se does not list the plant. One planted in 1920 stood in the Ryston Hall arboretum, Norfolk, in the early 20th century. 'Atropupurea', listed as a wych cultivar, was present in The Hague in the 1930s. In the USA U. montana atropurpurea was marketed by the Klehm nursery of Arlington Heights, Illinois, in the early 20th century.

A specimen labelled U. glabra 'Atropurpurea' at Wakehurst Place survives by being treated as a hedging plant, too low to attract the attentions of the Scolytus beetles that act as vectors of Dutch elm disease. 'Atropurpurea', with seed central, not marginal, in the samara and a deeper and more lasting purple coloration on mature shoots than that of hybrid 'Purpurea', is present in Drottningholmsvägen, Stockholm.

=== Putative specimens ===
Two large old elms, about 18 m tall, with a deeper purple spring coloration than hybrid 'Purpurea', misnamed locally U. procera 'Purpurea', flanked the Fredrikskyrkan in central Karlskrona, Sweden, till 27 October 2006, when they fell during a storm.

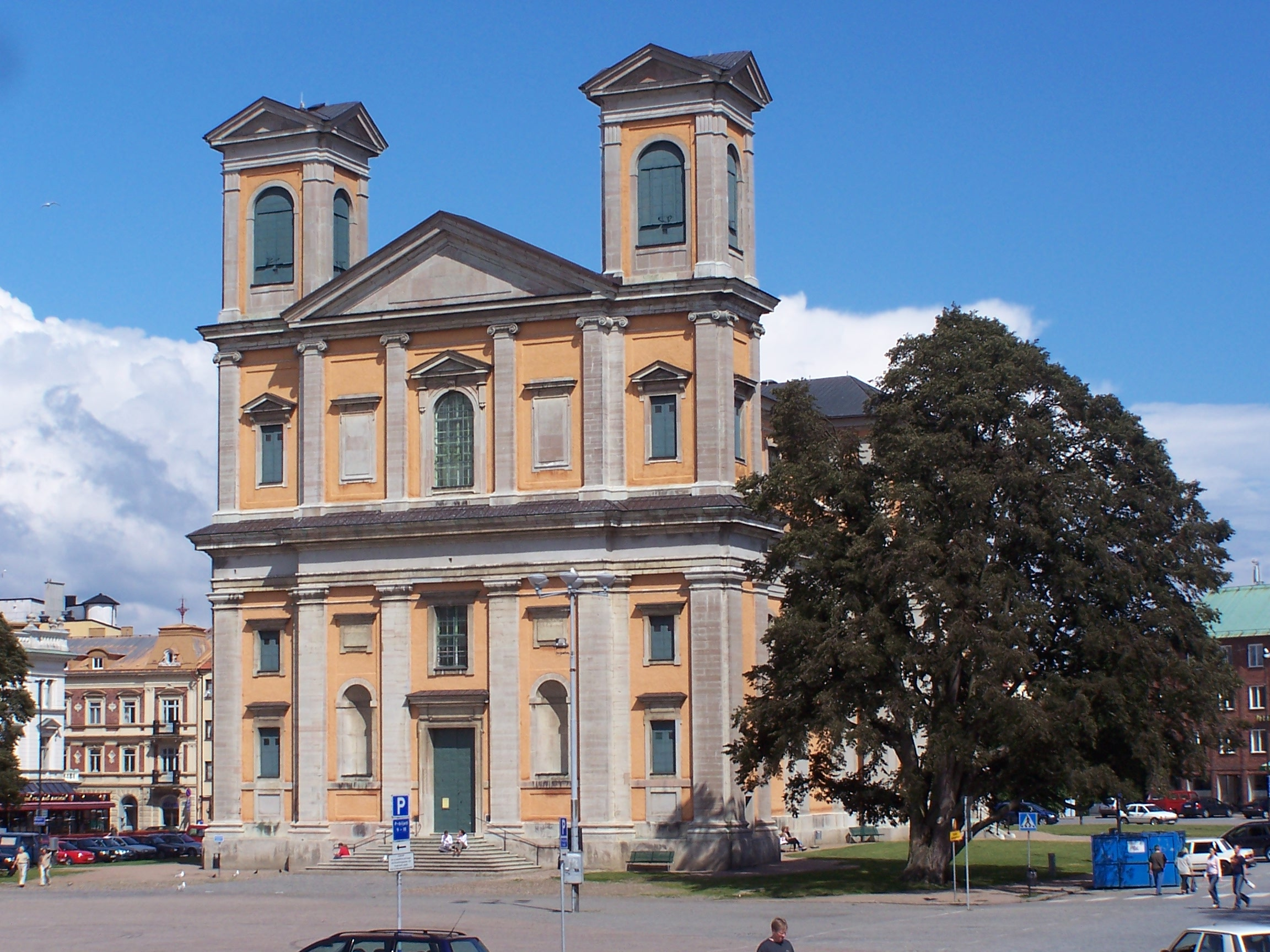
Fredrikskyrkan purple-leaved elm, Karlskrona, June 2004

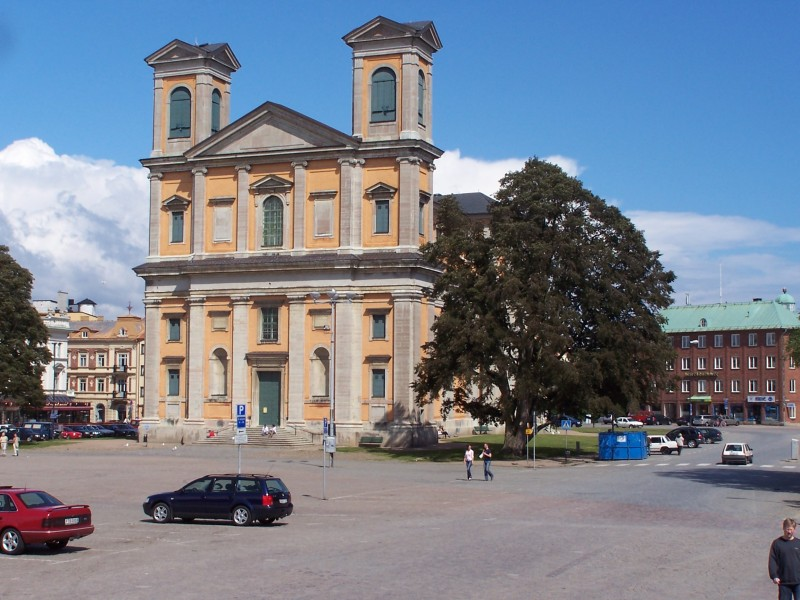
Fredrikskyrkan purple-leaved elms Karlskrona, 2004

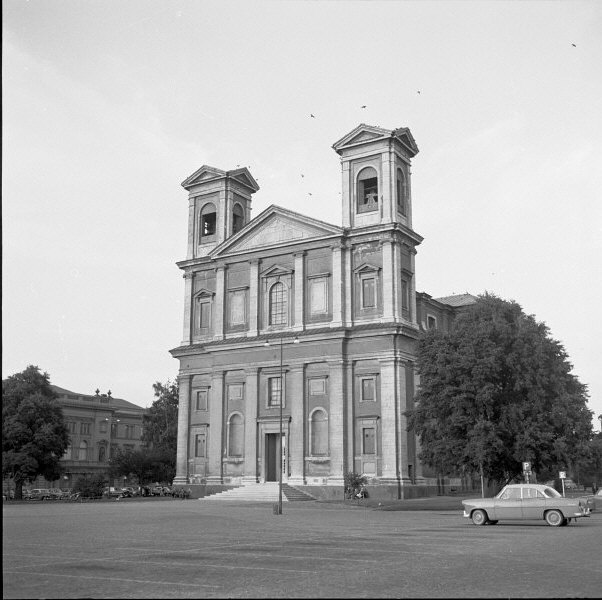
Same, 1960

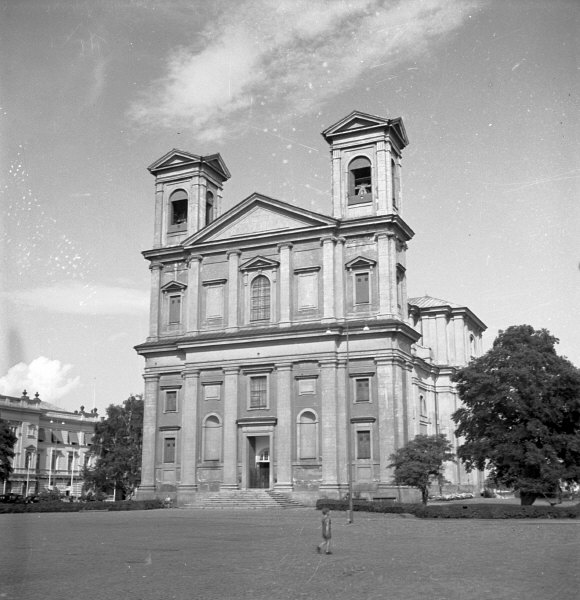
Same, 1944

== Synonymy ==
- Ulmus montana (: glabra) var. atropurpurea: Elwes and Henry
- Ulmus montana (: glabra) 'Purpurea' [Kew Garden list of names ]

== Accessions ==
Europe

- Royal Botanic Garden Wakehurst Place, UK, acc. no. 1896-1411.
