= John Young (died 1589) =

English politician

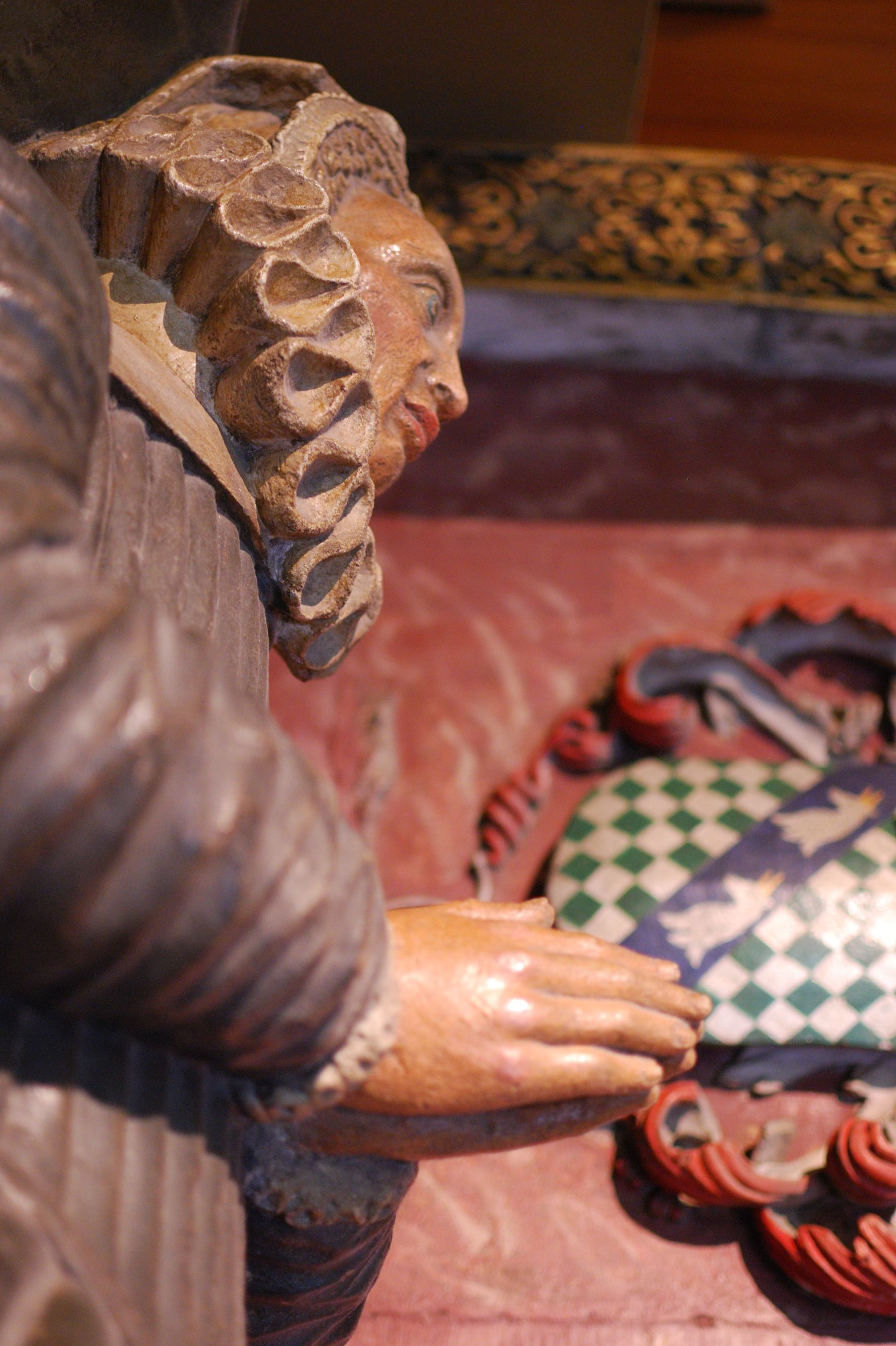
Effigy of Joan Wadham, Lady Young, Bristol cathedral, showing the arms of Young: Lozengy argent and vert, on a bend azure two ibex's heads and necks erased of the first

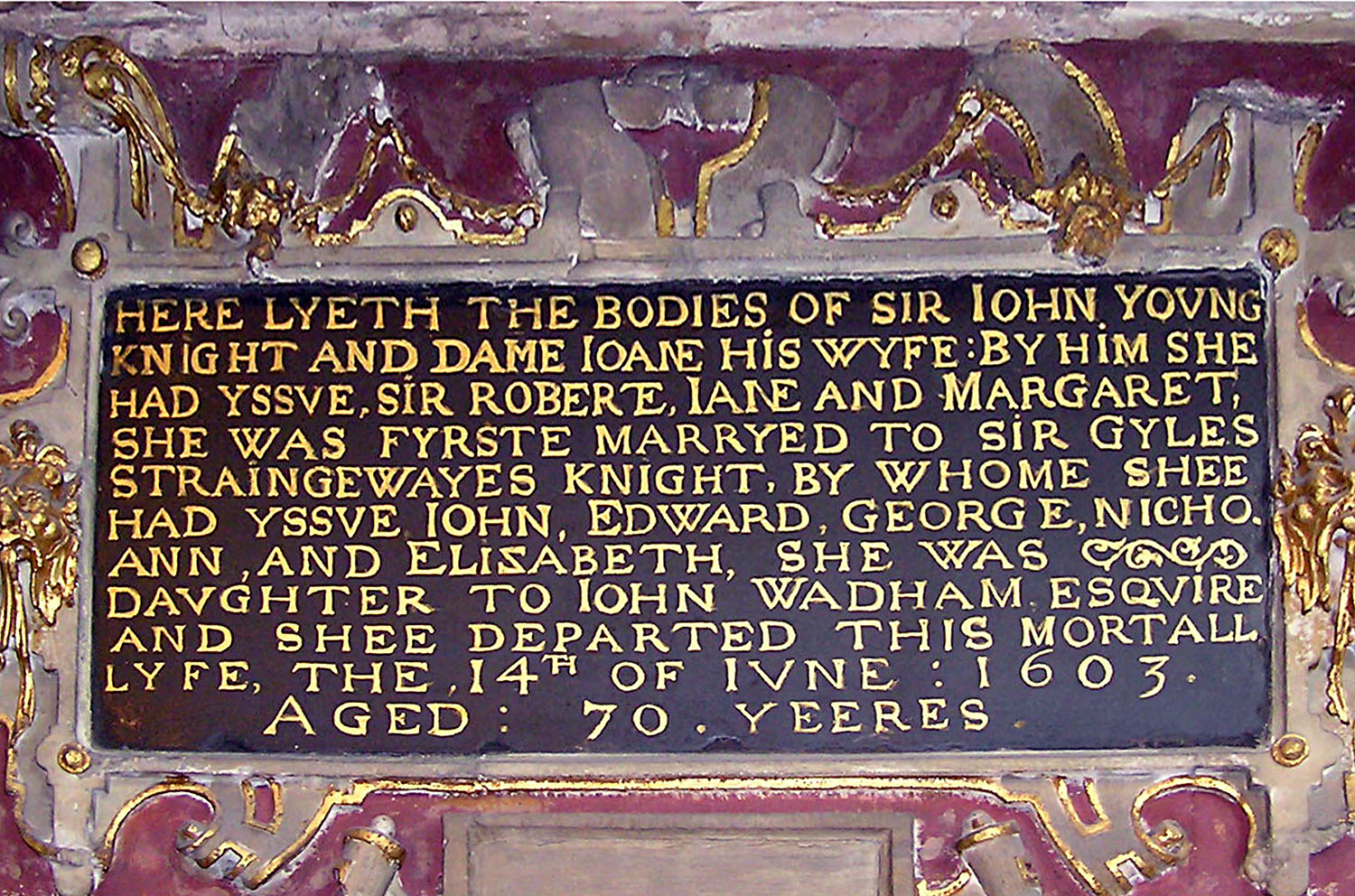
Tomb inscription in Bristol cathedral

Sir John Young (by 1519 – 4 September 1589), of The Great House, Bristol, of London and of Melbury Sampford, Dorset, was an English politician.

== Origins ==
He was the eldest surviving son of Hugh Young (d.1534) of Bristol and of Castle Combe in Wiltshire by his wife Alice, of unrecorded family.

== Career ==
He was a member of parliament for Old Sarum, Wiltshire, in 1547 and 1571, for Plymouth, Devon, in 1555, for Devizes, Wiltshire, in 1559, and for West Looe, Cornwall, in 1563. He served as Sheriff of Dorset for 1569–70 and was a Justice of the Peace for Dorset and Somerset from c.1573. He was knighted in 1574 by Queen Elizabeth I when on her progress into Wales she stayed as his guest at The Great House, Bristol, his mansion on the site of the dissolved Carmelite Friary (alias the Grey Friars, at St. Augustine's Back, later the site of Colston Hall). "On her arrival she was met at Lafford's Gate by the mayor and aldermen on horseback in state, and was conducted with much ceremony and mas querade to the house of Mr. John Yonge. Here the Queen kept her Court from the 14th to 20 August inclusive". Sir John began construction of the house in 1568. The only surviving part of the estate today is the Red Lodge, completed by his widow in 1590, which is open today (2024) as the Red Lodge Museum, Bristol.

== Marriage and children ==
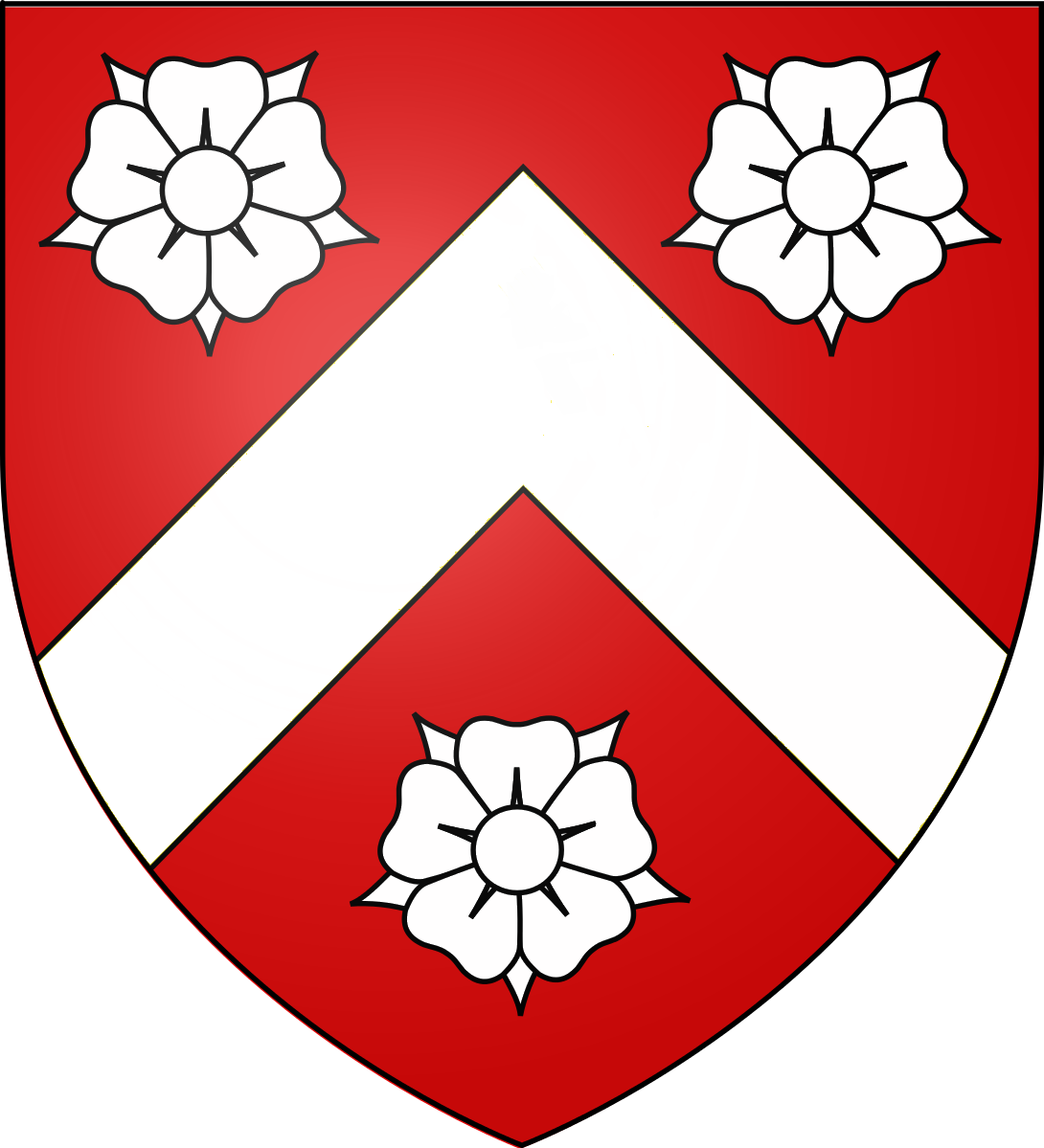
Arms of Wadham: Gules, a chevron between three roses argent

He married Joan Wadham (1533-14 June 1603), widow of Sir Giles Strangways (d. 1562), MP, of Melbury Sampford in Dorset, a daughter of John Wadham (d.1578) of Merryfield in the parish of Ilton in Somerset and of Edge, Branscombe in Devon, and a sister and co-heiress of Nicholas Wadham (1531–1609), co-founder of Wadham College, Oxford. By his wife he had a son and two daughters as follows:

- Sir Robert Young (born 1570), knighted on 18 April 1604 by King James I of England at Whitehall, when he was described as "of Somerset". He might then have been residing at Easton-in-Gordano, which belonged to him, or at Halsbury, inherited from his father.
- Jane Young
- Margaret Young

== Death and burial ==
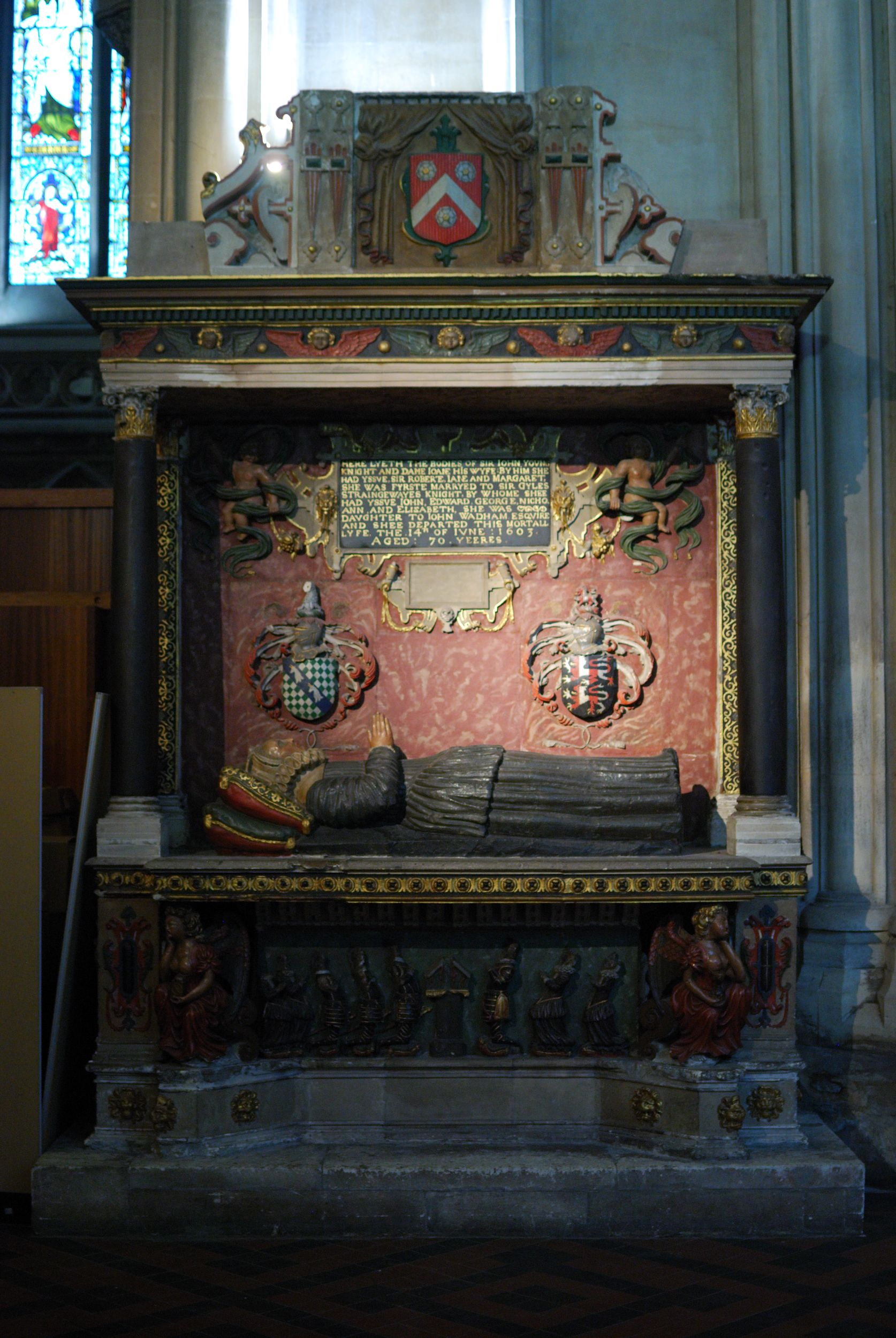
Monument with recumbent effigy of Joan Wadham (1533–1603), wife successively of Sir Giles Strangways and Sir John Young, Bristol Cathedral

Sir John died at Bristol in 1589 and was buried in Bristol Cathedral. His wife died 14 years later and erected the altar tomb which survives, displaying the recumbent effigy of herself (originally with two kneeling male figures, missing since the monument was dismantled in 1861), with the armorials of both her husbands, Strangways and Young, beneath the arms of Wadham. The inscription within a strapwork frame is as follows:

"Here lyeth the bodies of Sir John Young, Knight, and Dame Joane his wyfe. By him she had yssue Roberte, Jane and Margaret. She was fyrste marryed to Sir Gyles Straingewayes, Knight, by whome shee had yssue John, Edward, George, Nicho(las), Ann and Elizabeth. She was daughter to John Wadham, Esquire, and shee departed this mortall lyfe 14 June 1603 aged 70 yeeres"

Towards the end of her life, Dame Joan was involved in litigation with Queen Elizabeth I in the Case of the Swans.

== Archives ==
Deeds of the Red Lodge, including a record of John Young's transaction with Francis Rowley, the previous owner of the land, are held at Bristol Archives (Ref. 5535) (online catalogue). These deeds also contain details of later owners of the Red Lodge, including Lady Byron and Mary Carpenter.

== Sources ==
- Virgoe, Roger, biography of Young, John (by 1519–89), of Bristol, Glos., London and Melbury Sampford, Dorset, published in History of Parliament, House of Commons 1509–1558, ed. S. T. Bindoff, 1982
- Maclean, Sir John, Notes on the Family of Yonge, or Young, of Bristol, and on the Red Lodge, Transactions of Bristol and Gloucestershire Archaeological Society, Volume 15, pp. 221–245
