= Giles Strangways (disambiguation) =

Giles Strangways (1615–1675), was an MP.

Giles Strangways may also refer to:

- Giles Strangways (died 1546), MP
- Giles Strangways (1528–1562), MP
- Giles E. Strangways (1819–1906), pioneer settler of South Australia

== See also ==
- Giles Fox-Strangways
