= High Sheriff of Somerset =

British government office

The office of High Sheriff of Somerset is an ancient shrievalty which has been in existence since the 11th century. Originally known as the "Sheriff of Somerset", the role was retitled on 1 April 1974, under the provisions of the Local Government Act 1972.

The position of sheriff was once a powerful one, the holders being responsible for collecting taxes and enforcing law and order in Somerset, a county in South West England. In modern times the sheriff has become a ceremonial officer of the Crown, attending or presiding over many public events. Until 1567 the Sheriff of Somerset was also Sheriff of Dorset.

In England, Wales, and Northern Ireland the high sheriff is theoretically the sovereign's judicial representative in the county, while the lord-lieutenant is the sovereign's personal representative. Their jurisdictions, the "shrieval counties", are no longer co-terminous with administrative areas, representing a mix between the ancient counties and more recent local authority areas. The post is unpaid, except for a small court attendance allowance, and the general expenses of the office are borne personally by the holder. Eligibility for nomination and appointment of high sheriffs is controlled by the Sheriffs Act 1887.

The current high sheriff is Peter Dixon.

== Sheriffs of Somerset 11th century ==
- c. 1061 Godwine
- 1066-1068 Tovid or Tofig
- 1083-1086 William de Moyon

== Sheriffs of Somerset and Dorset ==
=== 11th and 12th century ===
- c. 1091 Aiulph the Chamberlain
- 1123-1130 Warin
- 1155 Richard de Monte Alto
- 1155 Richard de Raddona
- 1157 Walter de Lisoria
- 1162 Robert de Beauchamp
- 1163 Gerbert de Parcy
- 1167 Robert Pucherel
- 1169 Alfred of Lincoln
- 1175 Robert de Beauchamp
- 1182 William de Bendeng
- 1184 Robert Fitzpain
- 1188 Hugh Bardulf
- 1189: John, Count of Mortain
- 1194: William, Earl of Salisbury
- 1197: Peter de Scudamore
- 1199: Robert Belet

=== 13th century ===
- 1200: Hubert de Burgh
- 1204: William de Montacute
- 1204: Osbert de Stoke
- 1207: William Brewer
- 1209: William Malet
- 1212: Richard Marsh
- 1214: William de Harcourt
- 1215: Ralph de Bray
- 1216: William Longespée, 3rd Earl of Salisbury
- 1218: Peter de Maulay
- 1221: Roger de la Forde
- 1223: John Russell
- 1223: Jocelin of Wells
- 1226: William FitzHenry
- 1228: Thomas de Cirencester
- 1232: Peter de Rivaux
- 1234: Thomas de Cirencester
- 1237: Richard de Langford
- 1238: Herbert FitzMetthew
- 1239: Jordan Oliver
- 1240: Hugh de Vivonia
- 1242: Joel de Valletort
- 1249: Godfrey de Scudamore
- 1249: Bartholomew Petch
- 1250: Henry de Erleigh
- 1251: Elias de Rabayn
- 1254: John de Aller
- 1254: Stephen de Ashton
- 1257: Walter de Burges
- 1258: William Everard
- 1259: Philip de Cerne
- 1261: Philip Basset
- 1263: Henry of Almain, son of Richard, 1st Earl of Cornwall
- 1264: William de Staunton
- 1265: Ralph Russell
- 1266: Philip Basset
- 1267: Andrew Wake
- 1269: Thomas de St Vigor
- 1273: John de St Valery
- 1274: Richard de Coleshill
- 1278: John de Cormailles
- 1283: Sir John de St Loe (de Sancto Laudo)
- 1285: Queen Eleanor
- 1289: Richard de Burghunte
- 1291: Walter de Luveny
- 1293: Walter de Gloucester
- 1298: Nicholas de Cheyney
- 1299: John Gerberge (or John de Gerebert)

=== 14th century ===
- 1301: John de la Lee
- 1302: John Gerberge (or John de Gerebert)
- 1304: Matthew Furneaux
- 1305: John de Montacute
- 1306: Nicholas de Longlonde
- 1307: Nicholas Cheyney
- 1308: Walter Scudamore
- 1309: Richard Chesilden
- 1311: Walter Scudamore
- 1313: John Chideock
- 1314: John de Erleigh
- 1315: Matthew Furneaux
- 1316: John de Kyngeston
- 1318: Nicholas Cheyney
- 1320: Thomas de Marlberge
- 1325: John de Erleigh
- 1326: Thomas de Marlberge
- 1327: William de Whitefield
- 1330: Hugh de Langlonde
- 1332: John de Wraxall
- 1333: Hildebrand of London
- 1335: Walter Rodney
- 1336: Hildebrand of London
- 1338: Walter Rodney
- 1340: John Durburgh
- 1340: Walter Rodney
- 1340: John Durburgh
- 1341: Hugh Tyrel
- 1343: Edward Stradling
- 1343: Thomas Cary
- 1353: John Palton
- 1355: John St Loe
- 1356: Richard Turbevill
- 1358: Robert Martyn
- 1359: John de Raleigh
- 1360: Nicholas St Maur
- 1360: Edmund de Clevedon
- 1361: Theobald Gorges
- 1362: John de la Hale
- 1364: John de Langolnde
- 1368: Edmund Cheyney
- 1370: William Winterbourne
- 1371: Roger Manningford
- 1372: John Hamely of Wimborne St Giles
- 1373: Hugh Durburgh
- 1374: William Latimer
- 1375: Sir Edmund FitzHerbert of Hinton Martell
- 1376: Hugh Durburgh
- 1377: Sir John Delamare
- 1378: William Cogan
- 1379: Sir John Burghersh
- 1380: Theobald Gorges
- 1380: William Latimer
- 1381: Sir William de Bonvile
- 1382: Sir Edmund FitzHerbert of Hinton Martell
- 1383: Sir John Strech of Pinhoe and Hempston Arundel (Little Hempston)
- 1384: Sir John Burghersh
- 1385: John Copleston
- 1386: Sir Humphrey Stafford of Hooke, Dorset
- 1387: Sir John Rodney of Backwell and Rodney Stoke
- 1388: Sir John Moigne of Owermoigne
- 1389: Sir Thomas Brooke
- 1390: Sir John Berkeley of Beverston Castle
- 1391: Sir Humphrey Stafford of Hooke, Dorset
- 1392: John Bache (or Bathe)
- 1393: Theobald Wykeham of Tarrant Rushton
- 1394: Sir John Berkeley of Beverston Castle
- 1395: Sir John Moigne of Owermoigne
- 1396: Sir John Rodney of Backwell and Rodney Stoke
- 1397: Sir Thomas Arthur of Clapton-in-Gordano
- 1397: Sir Thomas Dackombe
- 1399: Sir Thomas Arthur of Clapton-in-Gordano

oooo

=== 15th century ===
- 1400: Richard Boyton of Currypool in Charlinch
- 1401: John Luttrell
- 1402: John Frome
- 1403: William Wroth of Newton Plecy
- 1404: Sir Thomas Pomeroy of Combe Raleigh
- 1405: Richard Boyton of Currypool in Charlinch
- 1406: Sir Walter Rodney of Stoke Rodney
- 1407: John Horsey
- 1408: Matthew Coker
- 1408: Robert Hill (c.1361-1423) of Spaxton
- 1409: Richard Boyton of Currypool in Charlinch
- 1410: Sir Humphrey Stafford of Hooke, Dorset
- 1411: John Horsey
- 1412: Robert Hill (c.1361-1423) of Spaxton
- 1413: Walter Hungerford
- 1414: John Warre
- 1415: Sir Humphrey Stafford
- 1416: Richard Boyton of Currypool in Charlinch
- 1417: Matthew Coker
- 1418: John Florey
- 1419: Robert Hill (c.1361-1423) of Spaxton
- 1420: John Newburgh
- 1422: Robert Hill (c.1361-1423) of Spaxton
- 1422: Robert Coker
- 1423: Richard Stafford
- 1424: Sir Edward Stradling
- 1426: Giles Daubeney
- 1426: William Finderne
- 1427: William Carent of Toomer in Henstridge
- 1428: Sir John Stourton, of Stourton, Co Wilts and of Stavordale Co, Somerset, High Sheriff of Somerset "In direct descent of the King, and entitled to quarter the Plantagenet Arms"
- 1430: John Warre
- 1431: John Stourton of Preston Plucknett
- 1432: John St Loe
- 1433: John Seymour
- 1434: William Carent of Toomer in Henstridge
- 1435: Thomas Thame
- 1436: John St Loe
- 1437: William Stafford
- 1438: Edward Hull
- 1439: Walter Rodney
- 1440: William Carent of Toomer in Henstridge
- 1441: William Stafford
- 1442: John St Loe
- 1443: Edward Hull
- 1444: Robert Cappes
- 1445: John Norris
- 1446: William Carent of Toomer in Henstridge
- 1447: John Chideock
- 1448: Edward Hull
- 1449: John Austell
- 1450: William Carent of Toomer in Henstridge
- 1451: Thomas Thame
- 1452: Richard Warre
- 1453: Nicholas Latimer
- 1454: John Cheyney
- 1455: John Willoughby
- 1456: Nicholas St Loe of Over Langford Manor
- 1457: Robert Warre
- 1458: John St Barbe
- 1459: John Carent
- 1460: Humphrey Stafford
- 1461: Thomas Herbert
- 1463: William Browning
- 1464: Christopher Worsley
- 1465: John Sydenham
- 1466: George Darrell
- 1467: Robert Stawell
- 1468: Reginald Stourton
- 1469: Christopher Worsley
- 1470: Nicholas Latimer
- 1471: John Cheverell
- 1472: John Biconyll
- 1473: Robert Palmer
- 1474: Giles Daubeney
- 1475: William Collingbourne
- 1476: Thomas Norton
- 1477: William Berkley
- 1478: William Say
- 1479: Edward Hartgtill
- 1480: Giles Daubeney
- 1481: Richard Morton
- 1482: Nicholas Crowmer
- 1483: Edward Redmayne
- 1484: Thomas Fulford
- 1485: Amias Paulet
- 1486: John Turbevill
- 1487: James Daubeney
- 1488: Hugh Luttrell
- 1489: William Martin
- 1490: Henry Burnell
- 1491: Amias Paulet
- 1492: Walter Enderby
- 1493: Edmund Carew
- 1494: Sampson Norton
- 1495: Sir Edmund Gorges of Wraxall, Somerset
- 1496: Roger Newburgh
- 1497: Richard Pudsey
- 1498: Sir Nicholas Wadham (died 1542) of Merryfield, Somerset and Edge, Devon.
- 1499: Amias Paulet

=== 16th century ===
- 1500: William Martin
- 1501: John Trevelyan
- 1502: Sir Edward Wadham of Pole Anthony, Tiverton and Tomarton, Gloucestershire.
- 1503: Sir Henry Uvedale
- 1504: John Horsey
- 1505: John Sydenham
- 1506: John Carew
- 1507: John Williams
- 1508: John Bevyn
- 1509: Richard Weston
- 1510: John Speke
- 1511: Walter Rodney
- 1512: Giles Strangeways of Melbury House, Melbury Sampford.
- 1513: William Compton
- 1514: Edward Gorges
- 1515: John Seymour
- 1516: Thomas de la Lynd
- 1517: Sir Giles Strangeways of Melbury House, Melbury Sampford.
- 1518: William Compton
- 1519: John Bourchier, 2nd Earl of Bath
- 1520: William Wadham of Catherston, Dorset.
- 1521: John Rogers
- 1522: William Carent
- 1523: Thomas Trenchard
- 1524: Sir Giles Strangeways of Melbury House, Melbury Sampford.
- 1525: George Speke
- 1526: John Seymour
- 1527: John Russell, 1st Earl of Bedford
- 1528: Sir Andrew Luttrell
- 1529: Edward Gorges
- 1530: Thomas Arundell of Wardour Castle.
- 1531: Edward Seymour, 1st Duke of Somerset
- 1532: Sir Thomas More
- 1533: Sir Giles Strangeways of Melbury House, Melbury Sampford.
- 1534: Sir Nicholas Wadham of Edge, Branscombe, Devon and Merryfield, Ilton, Somerset.
- 1535: Francis Dawtrey
- 1536: Hugh Paulet of Hinton St George
- 1537: John Horsey of Clifton Maybank, Dorset
- 1538: Henry Long
- 1539: Sir Thomas Speke of White Lackington
- 1540: Sir Thomas Arundell of Wardour Castle.
- 1541: Sir Giles Strangeways of Melbury House, Melbury Sampford.
- 1542: Hugh Paulet of Hinton St George
- 1543: John Paulet (later Marquess of Winchester
- 1544: John Horsey of Clifton Maybank, Dorset
- 1545: Nicholas FitzJames
- 1546: Sir John Sydenham of Brimpton
- 1547: Hugh Paulet of Hinton St George
- 1548: Sir John Thynne of Longleat
- 1549: Sir Thomas Speke of White Lackington
- 1550: George de la Lynd
- 1551: John St Loe of Sutton Court, Bishops Sutton of Over Langford Manor and Church of St Saviour, Puxton.
- 1552: John Rogers of Bryanston
- 1553: John Tregonwell
- 1554: Sir John Sydenham of Brimpton, Sir George Sydenham, Thomas Luttrell
- 1555: Henry Ashley of Wimborne St Giles
- 1556: Sir John Wadham (died 1578) of Merryfield, Somerset and Edge, Devon.
- 1557: Humphrey Colles of Barton Grange and Nether Stowey
- 1558: John Horsey of Clifton Maybank
- 1559: Thomas Dyer of Sharpham and Weston
- 1560: James FitzJames
- 1561: John Wyndham Sir John Wadham;
- 1562: George Speke of White Lackington
- 1563: John Horner
- 1564: Henry Ashley of Wimborne St Giles
- 1565: Henry Uvedale
- 1566: Thomas Morton

== Sheriffs of Somerset ==
=== 16th and 17th century ===
- 1567: Sir Maurice Berkeley of Bruton
- 1568: George Norton
- 1569: Henry Portman
- 1570: Thomas Luttrell of Dunster Castle (died Jan, 1571)
- 1570: John Sydenham
- 1571: George Rogers of Cannington
- 1572: John Horner
- 1573: John Sydenham
- 1574: John Stawell
- 1575: Christopher Kenn
- 1576: Thomas Malett of Enmore and Currypool
- 1577: George Sydenham
- 1578: John Colles of Barton Grange
- 1579: John Brett
- 1580: Maurice Rodney
- 1581: Henry Newton
- 1582: John Buller of Wood in Knowle St. Giles and Lillesdon
- 1583: Arthur Hopton of Witham Friary
- 1584: Gabriel Hawley (d.1603) of Buckland Priory, Somerset
- 1585: Nicholas Wadham (1531-1609) of Merryfield, Somerset and Edge, Devon.
- 1586: John Clifton
- 1587: Henry Berkeley of Norwood Park, Stoke and Bruton
- 1588: Edward St Barbe
- 1589: Samuel Norton
- 1590: Hugh Portman of Orchard Portman
- 1591: Sir John Harrington
- 1592: George Speke
- 1593: George Luttrell of Dunster Castle
- 1594: Henry Walrond
- 1595: John Faunceys
- 1596: John Stawell
- 1597: John Colles of Barton Grange
- 1598: John Jennings
- 1599: George Rodney
- 1600: Sir Hugh Portman of Orchard Portman
- 1601: John Malet
- 1602: John May or Mayo
- 1603: Edward Rogers of Cannington
- 1604: John Wyndham
- 1606: Thomas Horner
- 1607: Edward Hext of Low Ham (Netherham)
- 1608: Edward Gorges
- 1609: George Luttrell of Dunster Castle
- 1610: Francis Baber
- 1611: Sir John Rodney of Pilton and Stoke Rodney
- 1612: Robert Henley
- 1613: Natahniel Still
- 1614: Sir John Horner of Mells
- 1615: Bartholomew Michell
- 1616: John Colles
- 1616: John Poulett of Hinton St George
- 1617: Robert Hopton of Ditcheat
- 1618: Theodore Newton
- 1619: John Trevelyan
- 1620: Henry Henley
- 1621: Marmaduke Jennings
- 1622: Edward Popham of Huntworth
- 1623: William Faunceys
- 1624: Thomas Wyndham
- 1625: Robert Phelips
- 1626: John Clark Symes of Poundisford Park, Pitminster
- 1627: Sir John Latch of Over Langford Manor
- 1628: Sir John Stawell of Cothelstone
- 1629: Thomas Thyne
- 1630: Francis Dodington
- 1631: Thomas Luttrell of Dunster Castle
- 1632: William Walrond
- 1633: John Carew
- 1634: Henry Hodges
- 1635: John Malet of Enmore Castle
- 1636: William Bassett
- 1637: William Portman
- 1638: William Every
- 1639: Thomas Wroth of Petherton Park
- 1640: John Hippisley
- 1641: Martin Sanford of Nynehead Court
- 1642: Edward Wyndham of Kentsford and Cathanger
- 1642: Thomas Brydges
- 1644: Sir John Horner of Mells Manor
- 1646: Richard Cole
- 1648: John Preston
- 1648: John Buckland
- 1649: Henry Bonner
- 1650: Alexander Pym
- 1651: Edward Ceely
- 1652: George Luttrell
- 1653: William Cole
- 1654: Robert Hunt of Speckington, Yeovilton
- 1656: William Hillyard
- 1659: William Lacey
- 1660: William Helyar
- 1661: George Speke of Whitelackington
- 1662: John Warre of Hestercombe House, Kingston
- 1663: George Newton
- 1664: George Trevelyan
- 12 November 1665: Sir Hugh Smith, 1st Baronet, of Ashton Court
- 7 November 1666: George Stowell
- 6 November 1667: Sir George Horner, of Cloford
- 6 November 1668: Henry Rogers
- 11 November 1669: Roger Bourne
- 4 November 1670: Sir Thomas Gore
- 9 November 1671: William Strode
- 11 November 1672: Sir Francis Rolle, of Shapwick
- 12 November 1673: John Carew of Crowcombe
- 5 November 1674: Sir Halswell Tynte, 1st Baronet, of Halswell, Goathurst
- 15 November 1675: John Prowse, of Axbridge
- 10 November 1676: Ralph Stawell, of Low Ham
- 22 November 1676: Richard Landsdowne
- 15 November 1677: Sir Gregory Heekmore of Buckland Baron
- 14 November 1678: John Carew, of Cumerton
- 13 November 1679: Sir William Wyndham, 1st Baronet, of Orchard Wyndham, St. Decuman's
- 4 November 1680: Maurice Berkeley
- 1681: George Horner of Mells
- 1682: John Pigott (died 1727) of Brockley
- 1683: Henry Bull of Shapwick
- 1684: Edward Hobbs
- 1685: Edward Baber
- 1686: James Prowse
- 1687: Edward Strode
- 1688: Sir John Smith, Bt of Long Ashton
- 1689: Richard Morgan
- 1689: John Smythe
- 1690: William Whitchurch of Frome Selwood
- 1691: William Lacy of Hartrow, Stogumber
- 1692: Warwick Bampfield
- 1693: Robert Siderfin
- 1694: John Champneys
- 1695: Thomas Langton
- 1696: Thomas Dyke
- 1697: Joseph Langton
- 1698: Henry Mompesson of Corston, Wiltshire (1633–1715)
- 1699: Smart Goodenough

=== 18th century ===
- 1700: Francis Holles Newman
- 1701: William Helyar of East Coker (son of William, HS 1660)
- 1702: John Mogg
- 1703: Samuel Pitt
- 1704: Sir John Trevelyan, Bt of Nettlecombe
- 1705: Thomas Warre
- 1706: William Fraunceis
- 1707: Robert Smith
- 1708: Sir Thomas Wroth of Petherton Park
- 1709: Isaac Welman
- 1710: William Blackford
- 1711: Thomas Horner of Mells
- 1712: Harry Brydges
- 1713: William Strode
- 1714: John Trevillian
- 1715: Henry Walters
- 1716: Joseph Brown
- 1717: Thomas Archer
- 1718: Robert Everard
- 1720: Jepp Clarke
- 1721: William Applin
- 1721: Henry Strode
- 1722: Richard Comes
- 1723: Walter Robinson
- 1724: Christopher Baker
- 1724: John Gatchell
- 1725: Andrew Moore of Newton
- 1726: David Yea
- 1727: Edward Dyke
- 1727: Edward Dyke (the younger)
- 1728: Richard Champneys
- 1729: Gregory Gardiner
- 1730: John Pigott of Brockley (died in office March 1730)
- 1731: William Fraunceis of Comslory
- 1732: John Proctor
- 1733: John Smyth
- 1734: William Provis of Shepton Mallett
- 1734: Thomas Welman
- 1735: John Bricklade
- 1735: Joseph Langton
- 1736: Orlando Johnson
- 1737: John Periam
- 1738: James Chaffey Cowper
- 1739: John Smith of Stoney Littleton
- 1740: John Brickdale
- 1740: John Freke Brickdale
- 1741: John Provest of Shepton Mallett replaced by William Madox
- 1741: Edward Hallett
- 1742: Sir William Pynsent, Bt of Burton, Curry Rivell
- 1742: ?John Smith
- 1743: James Smyth of St. Audries
- 1743: William Sanford of Nynehead Court
- 1744: Edward Clarke
- 1745: Francis Newman
- 1746: John Halliday of Yard House, Taunton
- 1747: Thomas Coles
- 1748: James Jeanes
- 1749: Matthew Spencer
- 1750: Henry William Portman
- 1751: Sir Thomas Dyke Acland, Bt of Killerton
- 1752: John Harding
- 1753: John Macie
- 1754: Henry Fownes Luttrell
- 1755: Roger Lyde
- 1756: James Perry
- 1757: John Collins
- 1758: Philip Stevens
- 1759: Henry Powell
- 1760: Sir William Yea, 1st Baronet of Pyrling, Taunton
- 1761: John Adams
- 1762: Thomas Gunston
- 1763: Samuel Dodington
- 1764: William Helyar of East Coker
- 1765: Robert Paris Taylor of Burcott
- 1766: James Tooker
- 1767: William Provis, of Shepton Mallet
- 1768: John Helliar
- 1769: William Rodbard of Evercreech
- 1770: Nathaniel Webb
- 1771: Thomas Coward
- 1772: Henry Rodbard
- 1773: John Hugh Smyth
- 1774; John Old Goodford
- 1775: Thomas Champneys 1st Bt.
- 1776: Thomas Wilkins Morgan
- 1777: Sir John Trevelyan, Bt of Nettlecombe
- 1778: Thomas Horner
- 1779: Samuel Baker
- 1780: Edward Elton, of Winford Manor, Bristol
- 1781: John Ford
- 1782: James Ireland
- 1783: Peter Sherston
- 1784: Andrew Guy
- 1785: Richard Cross (? Crosse) of Broomfield
- 1786: James Stephens of Camerton
- 1787: Nathaniel Dalton of Shanks House
- 1788: John Lethbridge (after 1804 1st Baronet) of Sandhill Park, Bishops Lydeard
- 1789: Henry Hippisley Coxe of Downside
- 1790: John Stephenson
- 1791: Abraham Elton of Whitestanton
- 1792: Thomas Samuel Jolliffe of Trotton Place, Sussex
- 1793: Samuel Bailward
- 1794: Charles Knatchbull
- 1795: Edward Lyne
- 1796: John Tyndale Warre
- 1797: Samuel Day
- 1798: Samuel Rodbard
- 1798: John Hurle of Brislington Hill House
- 1799: James Bennett

=== 19th century ===
- 5 February 1800: Thomas Swimmer Champneys, of Orchard Leigh
- 11 February 1801: John Band, of Wookey
- 3 February 1802: Benjamin Greenhill, of Ston Easton
- 3 February 1803: Sir Hugh Smith, 3rd Baronet, of Wraxhall
- 1 February 1804: John Rogers, of Yarlington
- 6 February 1805: John Perring, of Combe Florey
- 1 February 1806: Clifton Wheate, of Corse
- 4 February 1807: Sir John Caesar Hawkins, 3rd Baronet, of Kelston
- 3 February 1808: Charles Kemeys-Tynte, of Halsewell
- 6 February 1809: John Nurton, of Milverton
- 31 January 1810: Thomas Strangways Horner, of Mells Park
- 8 February 1811: John Leigh, of Combe Hay
- 24 January 1812: William Vaughan, of Monkton Combe
- 10 February 1813: Peregrine Palmer Acland, of Fairfield
- 4 February 1814: George Edward Allen, of Bathampton
- 13 February 1815: John Phelips, of Montacute
- 1816: John Goodford of Yeovil
- 1817: Philip John Miles of Wraxall
- 1818: John Evered of Hill
- 1819: William Speke of Ashill
- 1820: Gerard Martin Berkeley Napier of East Pennard, who died in office 13 May 1820 and was replaced by Sir Charles Bampfylde, 5th Baronet
- 1821: William Hanning, of Dillington
- 1822: Vincent Stuckey of Langport
- 1823: John Frederick Pinney
- 1824: Edward Jefferies Esdaile
- 1825: John Quantock
- 1826: William Helyar
- 1827: Henry Powell Collins of Hatch Court, near Taunton
- 1828: John Hugh Smyth Pygott of Brockley
- 1829: Sir Alexander Hood, 2nd Bt of Wootton
- 1830: James Adam Gordon of Portbury
- 1831: Thomas Shewell Bailward, of Horsington
- 1832: Sir Henry Strachey, 2nd Baronet, of Sutton Court
- 1833: George Henry Carew, of Crowcombe Court
- 1834: Francis Popham, of West Bagborough
- 1835: William Manning Dodington, of Horsington
- 1836: James Bennett, of North Cadbury
- 1837: Alexander Adair, of Heatherton Park
- 1838: Robert Phippen, of Badgworth Court
- 1839: Sir William Medlycott, 2nd Baronet, of Milborne Port
- 1840: John Jarrett, of Camerton
- 1841: William Francis Knatchbull, of Babington
- 1842: Robert Charles Tudway, of the city of Wells
- 1843: Philip Pleydell-Bouverie, of Brymore
- 1844: John Fownes Luttrell, of Dunster Castle
- 1845: John Lee Lee, of Dillington House
- 1846: Richard Meade King, of Pyrland Hall
- 1847: John Matthew Quantock, of Norton-sub-Hamdon
- 1848: Edward Ayshford Sanford, of Nynehead Court
- 1849: George William Blathwayt, of Porlock
- 1850: Langley St Albyn, of Alfoxton
- 1851: Thomas Tutton Knyfton, of Uphill
- 1852: Montague Gore, of Barrow Court
- 1853: Francis Henry Dickinson, of Kingweston
- 1854: James Curtis Somerville, of Dinder
- 1855: George Barons Northcote, of Somerset Court
- 1856: John Hippisley, of Ston Easton Park
- 1857: Sir Arthur Elton, 7th Baronet, of Clevedon Court
- 1858: Sir Alexander Acland-Hood, 3rd Baronet, of St Audries
- 1859: Edward Berkeley Napier, of East Pennard
- 1860: Robert James Elton, of Whitestaunton
- 1861: Francis Wheat Newton, of Barton Grange
- 1862: Ralph Neville-Grenville, of Butleigh Court
- 1863: George Treweeke Scobell, of Kingwell
- 1864: Sir Edward Strachey, 3rd Baronet, of Sutton Court
- 1865: Sir John Henry Greville Smyth, 1st Baronet, of Ashton Court
- 1866: George Bullock
- 1867: Richard Thomas Combe
- 1868: Inigo William Jones
- 1869: William Blake
- 1870: Robert Guy Evered
- 1871: Henry Cornish Henley
- 1872: Mordaunt Fenwick-Bisset, of Bagborough, Taunton
- 1873: Richard King Meade-King, of Walford, Taunton
- 1874: George Fownes Luttrell, of Dunster Castle, Dunster
- 1875: Henry Gorges Moysey, of Batheaston Court, Wiveliscombe, Wellington
- 1876: Henry Duncan Skrine, of Warleigh, Bathford, Bath
- 1877: William Pinney, of Somerton Erleigh, Somerton
- 1878: Philip Pleydell Bouverie, of Brymore, Bridgwater
- 1879: Edward Charles Chetham-Strode, of South Hill, Shepton Mallet
- 1880: Edward James Stanley, of Quantock Lodge, Nether Stowey, Bridgwater
- 1881: Henry Acland Fownes Luttrell, of Badgworth Court, Axbridge
- 1882: Thomas Palfrey Broadmead
- 1883: Vincent Stuckey, of Hill House, Langport
- 1884: Charles Jefferys Watson Allen, of Lyngford House, Taunton
- 1885: John Francis Fortescue Horner, of Mells Park, Frome
- 1886: Alexander William Adair, of Heatherton Park, Wellington
- 1887: Thomas Marriott-Dodington, of Horsington House, Wincanton
- 1888: Antony Gibbs, of Charlton House, Wraxall, Nailsea
- 1889: Charles Edward Jeffries Esdaile, of Cothelstone, Taunton
- 1890: Edward Talbot Day Foxcroft, of Hinton Charterhouse, Bath
- 1891: William Wildman Kettlewell
- 1892: William Barrett
- 1893: Henry Ernst
- 1894: William Speke
- 1895: Sir Edmund Harry Elton, Bt., of Clevedon Court, Clevedon
- 1896: Robert Pooll Henry Batten-Pooll, of Road Manor, Road, Bath
- 1897: Henry Martin Gibbs of Barrow Gurney
- 1898: Edward William-Berkeley Portman of Hestercombe, Taunton.
- 1899: William Long of Woodlands, Congresbury, Bristol

=== 20th century ===
- 1900: Robert Neville-Grenville of Butleigh Court, Butleigh
- 1901: William Robert Phelips, of Montacute House, Montacute
- 1902: Edwin Brooke Cely Trevilian, of Midelney Manor, Curry Rivell, Taunton
- 1903: Frederick Spencer
- 1904: Henry Hales Pleydell-Bouverie
- 1905: William Henry Wills
- 1906: Francis James Fry
- 1907: Richard John Baynton Hippisley
- 1908: Colonel Edward Charles Ayshford Sanford of Chipley Park
- 1909: Arthur Fownes Somerville, of Dinder, Wells
- 1910: Henry Herbert Wills, of Barley Wood, Wrington, Bristol
- 1911: Sir Charles Chadwyck-Healey, Bt
- 1912: William Bucknell Broadmead
- 1913: Henry William Paget Hoskins
- 1914: Joseph Cooke Hurle
- 1915: Gerard Martin Berkeley Napier
- 1916: Francis Henry Cheetham
- 1917: Gerard Stuart Lysaght
- 1918: Henry Thomas Daniel
- 1919: Arthur Vaughan Hanning Vaughan-Lee
- 1920: Henry Matthew Ridley
- 1921: Arthur Capel
- 1922: Roger Marriott Dodington
- 1923: Sir Dennis Fortescue Boles, Bt.
- 1924: Arthur Campbell Duckworth
- 1925: Maurice Fearing Cely-Trevilian
- 1926: Sir Frank Beauchamp
- 1927: Walter Hanning-Speke
- 1928: Sir William Mason, Bt
- 1929: Harold Hamilton Broadmead
- 1930: Huntley Gordon Spencer
- 1931: William Oliver Evelyn Meade-King
- 1932: Reginald Arthur Hobhouse
- 1933: William Hartley Maud
- 1934: Sir Matthew Nathan of Manor House, West Coker
- 1935: Geoffrey Fownes Luttrell
- 1936: William Otter Gibbs
- 1937: James Archibald Garton
- 1938: Sir Archibald Lawrence Langman, Bt of North Cadbury Court
- 1939: Sir Frederick Henry Berryman of Shepton Mallet
- 1940: Arthur Hamilton Yatman
- 1941: Edward Phillip Thursfield
- 1942: Charles Edward Burnell
- 1943; Arthur Westall Vivian-Neal
- 1944: Frederick Willoughby Hancock
- 1945: Edmund Fletcher Rees-Mogg
- 1946: Walter Stuart Batten-Pooll of Rode Manor, Bath resigned April 1946
- 1946: Walter Douglas Melville Wills
- 1947: Edmund Page
- 1948: Hubert Stanley Radcliffe
- 1949: Henry Cave Daniel
- 1950: Henry William Whitby Hoskins
- 1951: Sir Robert John Sinclair of Cleeve Court, near Bristol.
- 1952: Arthur John Capel
- 1953: Wilfrid Leighton
- 1954: Major Walter Frank Quantock Shuldham, of East Stoke House, Stoke-under-Ham.
- 1955: Major General Roger Evans
- 1956: John Kenric La Touche Mardon
- 1957: John Goodenough Newton
- 1958: Wilfred Anson
- 1959: Nicholas Brabazon Clive-Ponsonby-Fane
- 1960: Sir Walter Luttrell
- 1961: Major Richard Edwin Fearing Cely-Trevilian, of Midelney Manor, Drayton, Langport.
- 1962: Lieutenant-Colonel Gilbert Sandford Poole, of The Vineyard, South Petherton,
- 1963: Colonel Cecil Townley Mitford-Slade, of Montys Court, Norton Fitzwarren, Taunton.
- 1964: Richard Hill, of Harptree Court, East Harptree.
- 1965: Marshal of the Royal Air Force Sir John Cotesworth Slessor, of Rimpton Manor, Yeovil
- 1966: Colonel Sir Edward William St. Lo Malet, Bt., of Chargot, Luxborough, Watchet
- 1967: Sir Ian Duff Lyle of Barrington Court
- 1968: Sir John Wills, Bt of Langford Court, Langford
- 1969: Hugh Webb Faulkner of Hatch Beauchamp, died in office 24 May 1969
- June 1969: William Quincy Roberts of Stonewalls, Newton St. Loe, near Bath
- 1970: John Anthony Clark
- 1971: Henry William Furse Hoskyns of South Petherton
- 1972: Colin John Richard Trotter
- 1973: Gerald Hignett

== High Sheriff of Somerset ==
=== 20th century ===
- 1974: David Tudway Quilter
- 1975: Matthew Waley-Cohen
- 1976: John Stephen Lloyd of Langford Budville
- 1977: Patrick Henry Daniel
- 1978: William Rees-Mogg
- 1979: William Kenneth Bingham Crawford
- 1980: John Alexander Lindley of Wellington, Somerset
- 1981: Arthur John Greswell
- 1982: Peter Gerald Hanning Speke of Rowlands, Ilminster
- 1983: Charles John de Salis
- 1984: Charles Edward Brabazon Clive-Ponsonby-Fane
- 1985: John Samuel Byard White
- 1986: Ewan James Hanning Cameron of Whitelackington Manor, Ilminster.
- 1987: Michael James Frederick Carter of Batcombe House, Shepton Mallet
- 1988: William Alexander Charles Theed of Combe Sydenham Hall, Taunton
- 1989: Ralph William Vivian-Neal of Poundisford Park, Poundisford, Taunton
- 1990: Malcolm Henry Alistair Fraser
- 1991: Ian Crawford MacDonald
- 1992: Edward William Ayshford Sanford of Chipley Park, Langford Budville
- 1993: John Hedworth Jolliffe
- 1994: Elizabeth Gass, Lady Gass
- 1995: Roy Scrymgeour Graham Hewett
- 1996: Christopher Phillip Thomas-Everard
- 1997: Richard Stanton Roy Sheldon
- 1998: Micaela Elizabeth Benedicta Beckett
- 1999: Thomas Andrew Heath Yandle

=== 21st century ===
- 2000: Angela Betty Yeoman
- 2001: Thomas Hugh Ruscombe Poole
- 2002: Robert Ian Hoddell of Grange Farm, Upper Langford, Bristol.
- 2003: Brian Michael Tanner of Fourways, 8 Broadlands Road, Taunton
- 2004: Stephen Alexander Evans of Tuckerton Farm, North Newton, Bridgwater.
- 2005: Fiona Clare Lambart Densham of Glaisters, Church Walk, Wrington.
- 2006: Brigadier Alastair Ian Hayward Fyfe of Seavington St Michael, Ilminster
- 2007: David John Medlock
- 2008: Anne Caroline Maw of Pilton
- 2009: John Alvis of Winford
- 2010: Patricia Ann Hunt of Taunton
- 2011: John David Cullum of Bath
- 2012: Sylvana Margery Glazebrook Chandler of Orchard Wyndham
- 2013: Maureen Effie Whitmore of Butcombe
- 2014: Richard David Ayshford Lloyd of Langford Budville, Wellington
- 2015: Lucy Nelson of Pen Selwood, Wincanton
- 2016: Edward Bayntun-Coward of Midford, Bath
- 2017: Richard Saladin Hickmet of Bridgwater
- 2018: Denis Andrew Southerden Burn of Cleeve, Bristol
- 2019: Jonathan Alexander Newton Halliday of Corfe, Taunton
- 2020: Mary-Clare Helene Rodwell of Shepton Mallett
- 2021: William Henry Thomas Sheppard of Bath
- 2022: Jennifer Margaret Duke of Luxborough, Watchet
- 2023: Robert Nicholas Foord Drewett of Bishop Sutton
- 2024: Robert John Beckley, of Taunton
- 2025: Janet Montgomery, of Yeovil
- 2026: Peter Charles Dixon, Bath
