= John Stourton (died 1438) =

Arms of Stourton: Sable, a bend or between six fountains

John Stourton (died 1438) of Preston Plucknett in Somerset was seven times MP for Somerset, in 1419, 1420, December 1421, 1423, 1426, 1429 and 1435.

== Origins ==
He was the youngest son of John Stourton of Stourton, Wiltshire, by his second wife a certain Alice (d. 1407). His sister was Margaret Stourton who became the Abbess of Shaftesbury Abbey, His elder half-brother was William Stourton (died 1413) of Stourton, Speaker of the House of Commons and father of John Stourton, 1st Baron Stourton (1400–1462).

== Marriages and children ==
He married three times, having no sons, and left three daughters by three different marriages as co-heiresses. His first marriage, before 1403, was to Joan Banaster (c. 1376–1406), daughter and heiress of William Banaster (d. 1395) of East Lydford in Somerset, widow of Robert Affeton. Their daughter, Cecily Stourton, married firstly John Hill MP, of Spaxton in Somerset, son of Robert Hill (c. 1361 – 1423) of Spaxton, and grandson of Sir John Hill (died 1408) Justice of the King's Bench; secondly Sir Thomas Kyriell of Sarre in Kent.

Before 1416, he married Alice Denys (or Peny) and had a daughter, Joan Stourton, who became the wife of John Sydenham MP, of Combe Sydenham in Somerset. She inherited from her father the manor of Brympton d'Evercy in Somerset, later the seat of her descendants the Sydenham baronets.

His third marriage, some time before 1430, was to Catherine Payne (d. 20 March 1473) who was a daughter of Thomas Payne of Yarcombe in Devon by his wife Margery Yeovilton, daughter and heiress of Peter Yeovilton of Speckington in Somerset. Their daughter, Alice Stourton, married twice. First, to William Daubeney (1424–1460/1), MP, of Ingleby in Lincolnshire and of South Petherton and Barrington Court in Somerset, by whom she was the mother of Giles Daubeney, 1st Baron Daubeney (1451–1508), KG. Secondly, she married Robert Hill of Houndstone, nephew of Robert Hill (c. 1361 – 1423) of Spaxton. Their daughter, Joan Hill, married Sir Nicholas Wadham (died 1542) by whom she had many children.

== Landholdings ==
The manors he held included Preston Plucknett, his seat, where he built the manor-house which survives as Abbey Farm House, Yeovil and Brympton d'Evercy, Somerset, of which he acquired the reversion.
