= John Rodney (disambiguation) =

John Rodney is an actor.

John Rodney may also refer to:

- Sir John Rodney (MP) (died 1400), MP for Somerset 1391
- John Rodney (died 1612), MP for Great Bedwyn 1604–11
- John Rodney (of Armsworth) (1765–1847), MP for Launceston 1790–96, Colonial Secretary of Ceylon 1806-33
