= Falle (surname) =

Falle is a surname. Notable people with the surname include:

- Bertram Falle, 1st Baron Portsea (1859-1948), British politician
- Natasha Falle (born 1974), Canadian human rights activist
- Philip Falle (1656-1742), English historian
- Philip Falle (sailor) (1885-1936), British Olympian
- Sir Sam Falle (1919-2014), British diplomat
