= Amias Paulet (died 1538) =

English landowner and soldier

Sir Amias Paulet (died 1538) was an English soldier, official, and sheriff of Somerset and Dorset.

== Origins ==
Probably born sometime in the late 1450s/1460s, Amias Paulet was the son of Sir William Paulet (d. 1488) of Hinton St. George, Somerset, and Elizabeth Deneland. Paulet was brought up a Lancastrian, and took part in Buckingham's rebellion of 1483 against Richard III, for which he was attainted. Restored two years later, in 1485, Paulet was subsequently made sheriff for Somerset and Dorset under Henry VII.

== Career ==
Amias Paulet was a skilled and respected soldier, fighting in 1487 at the Battle of Stoke and was one of the 52 men subsequently knighted for their service. Paulet was tasked with collecting the fines of various individuals implicated in the failed rebellion of Perkin Warbeck in 1497. In 1501, he was one of the west-country gentlemen who met with Catherine of Aragon, the future wife of Henry VII's son and heir, Arthur.

Under Henry VIII, Paulet travelled to France to command 25 men in the expedition to the north of France in 1513, during the first Anglo-French war of Henry VIII's reign.

== Altercations with Thomas Wolsey ==
It is alleged that when Thomas Wolsey, not yet a man of much reputation, came to take possession of the benefice of Limington in Somerset, Paulet clapped him in the stocks. The precise details are unknown and vague but it is likely that Wolsey and Paulet quarrelled over a minor issue, the former possibly being inebriated.

In 1521, Paulet became treasurer for Middle Temple and Wolsey, now Lord Chancellor and the King's closest adviser, took revenge on him for the previous indignity which Paulet had put upon him. Wolsey ordered Paulet not to leave London unless given permission (by Wolsey) and so Paulet stayed virtually a prisoner in the Middle Temple for five or six years. In order to gain Wolsey's favour and forgiveness, Paulet placed Wolsey's arms on the Middle Temple gateway.

== Marriages and children ==
Dying in 1538, Amias Paulet married twice. He only produced children from the second marriage:

- Firstly, he married Margaret, daughter of Sir John Paulet, himself the grandfather of William Paulet, 1st Marquess of Winchester, who held prominent positions under Henry VIII, Edward VI, Mary I, and Elizabeth I.
- Secondly, he married Laura, daughter of William Kellaway and by her had three sons and a daughter:
  - Sir Hugh Paulet (bef. 1510 – 6 December 1573), an English military commander and Governor of Jersey.
  - John
  - Henry
  - Elizabeth, who married firstly to John Sidenham, secondly to William Carswell, and thirdly to Henry Coppleston.

Political offices
Preceded by Thomas Fulford	Sheriff of Somerset and Dorset; 1485	Succeeded by John Turbevill
Preceded by Henry Burnell	Sheriff of Somerset and Dorset; 1491	Succeeded by Walter Ebderby
Preceded by Nicholas Wadham	Sheriff of Somerset and Dorset; 1499	Succeeded by William Martin
