= Giles Strangways (died 1546) =

16th-century English politician

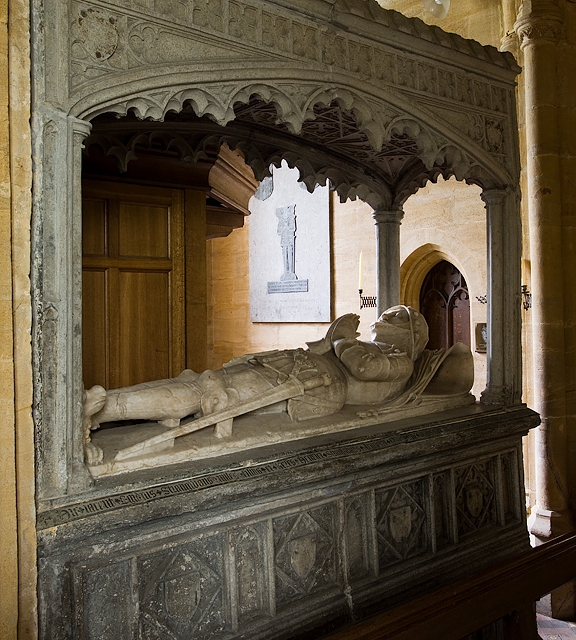
Anachronistic alabaster effigy of Sir Giles Strangways (1486-1546), Melbury Sampford Church (Chapel of St Mary), Dorset. Made for a member of the Brouning family who died in the mid 15th c., but appropriated by the Strangways.

Arms of Strangways: Sable, two lions passant paly of six argent and gules

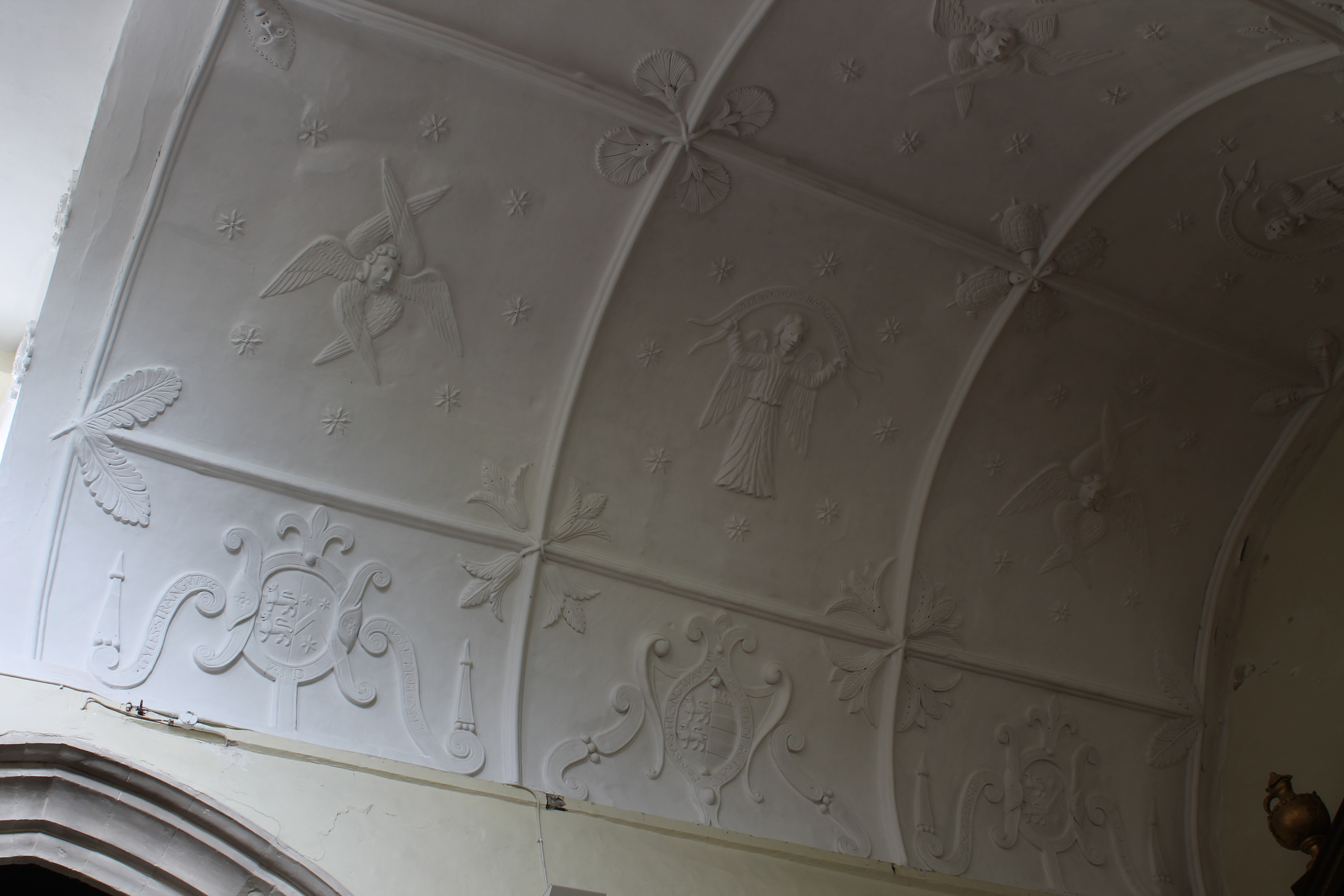
Ornamental plaster barrel vault in St Nicholas's Church, Abbotsbury, installed by Sir John Strangways in 1638. The decoration is of angels, cherubs and the Strangways' family arms. Foreground: Strangways impaling Mordaunt (Argent, a chevron between three estoiles sable), for Sir Giles Strangways (1486–1546), of Melbury Sampford, and his wife Joan Mordaunt. Background: Strangways impaling Manners, for Sir Henry Strangways (d. 1544) (son of Sir Giles Strangways and Joan Mordaunt), died at the Siege of Boulogne, and his wife Margaret Manners, a daughter of George Manners, 11th Baron de Ros by his wife Anne St. Leger

Sir Giles Strangways (1486 – 11 December 1546), of Melbury House, Melbury Sampford, and of Abbotsbury, both in Dorset, was an English politician.

== Origins ==
He was the eldest son of Sir Henry Strangways (c.1465–1504) of Melbury Sampford, Dorset by his first wife Dorothy Arundell, a daughter of Sir John Arundell (born 1418) of Lanherne in Cornwall, Sheriff of Cornwall in 1443, Vice-Admiral of Cornwall, by his second wife Catherine Chiddocke, a daughter and co-heiress of Sir John Chiddocke of Dorset and widow of William Stafford of Frome. Sir Henry Strangways survived his first wife and remarried to the widow of William Browning (or Brouning), lord of the manor of Melbury Sampford, which manor thereby became a possession and the principal seat of his descendants from his first marriage.

=== Early origins ===
Sir Giles Strangway's grandfather was the first to settle in Dorset, having left Yorkshire on the suggestion of Thomas Grey, 1st Marquess of Dorset. His ancestors were seated at Harlsey Castle in Yorkshire, where continued the senior line until the 16th century, a prominent member of which was James Strangeways (1415–1480), Speaker of the House of Commons and thrice Sheriff of Yorkshire.

== Career ==
He succeeded his father in 1504 and was knighted in 1514. He was made an Esquire of the body by 1509. He also was appointed a Justice of the Peace for Dorset in 1509 for life, for Somerset from 1514 to 1521 and for the western circuit in 1540. He was Sheriff of Somerset and Sheriff of Dorset for 1512–13, 1517–18, 1524–25, 1533–34 and 1541–42 and a Member of Parliament for Dorset in 1529 and 1539.

He took part in the French campaign of 1514 and was part of the contingent of English knights with Henry VIII at the Field of Cloth of Gold in 1520 and at the reception of Charles V at Canterbury in May 1522. He was also on campaign in France in 1523 and appointed Vice-Admiral of Dorset from c. 1526 to 1536.

Following the Dissolution of the Monasteries in 1543 he acquired Abbotsbury Abbey in Dorset, together with the manors of Abbotsbury and East Elworth, for which he paid nearly £2,000.

== Marriage and issue ==
He married Joan Mordaunt, a daughter of Sir John Mordaunt of Turvey, Bedfordshire, MP, by whom he had a son and two daughters, including:

- Sir Henry Strangways (died 1544), who predeceased his father, having died at the Siege of Boulogne. He married Margaret Manners, a daughter of George Manners, 11th Baron de Ros (c. 1470–1513) of Hamlake Castle in Yorkshire, and a sister of Thomas Manners, 1st Earl of Rutland (c. 1492–1543). He was the father of Sir Giles Strangways (c. 1528–1562), MP.

== Death and burial ==
He died in 1546 and was buried at Melbury Sampford. He was succeeded by his grandson Sir Giles Strangways (c. 1528–1562). Surviving in Melbury Sampford Church under the south arch is his monument, a chest tomb with canopy beneath which lies a recumbent effigy of a fully armed knight with his hands together in prayer. It was made about a century before to commemorate a member of the Brouning family but has been altered to form the monument of Sir Giles Strangways. The knight's helm displays the grasshopper crest of Brouning. Around the side of the top edge of the chest tomb is a brass fillet (replacing the former one) inscribed in Latin as follows:

Hic jacent Egidius Strangewaies miles filius et heres Henrici Strangewaies armigeri et Dorothae uxoris suae filiae Johannis Arundel militis. Nec non Johanna uxor predict(i) Egid(ii) et filia Johannis Mordant militis. Egidius obiit die 11 Decembris 1547 cuius a(n)i(ma)e p(ro)pici(e)tur D(omin)o Amen.

Which may be translated as: ("Here lie Giles Strangeways, Knight, the son and heir of Henry Strangeways, Esquire, and of Dorothy his wife, the daughter of John Arundel, Knight; and also Johanna, the wife of the foresaid Giles, and daughter of John Mordaunt, Knight. Giles died on the 11th of December 1547. Of the soul of whom may it be looked upon with favour by God Amen"). An almost identical monument survives in the same church, under the north arch, of William Brouning/Browning, former lord of the manor, and Katherine Dru and Alice Burton his wives, erected by Alice in 1467.
