= Church of St Peter, Ilton =

Church in Somerset, England

Church of St Peter
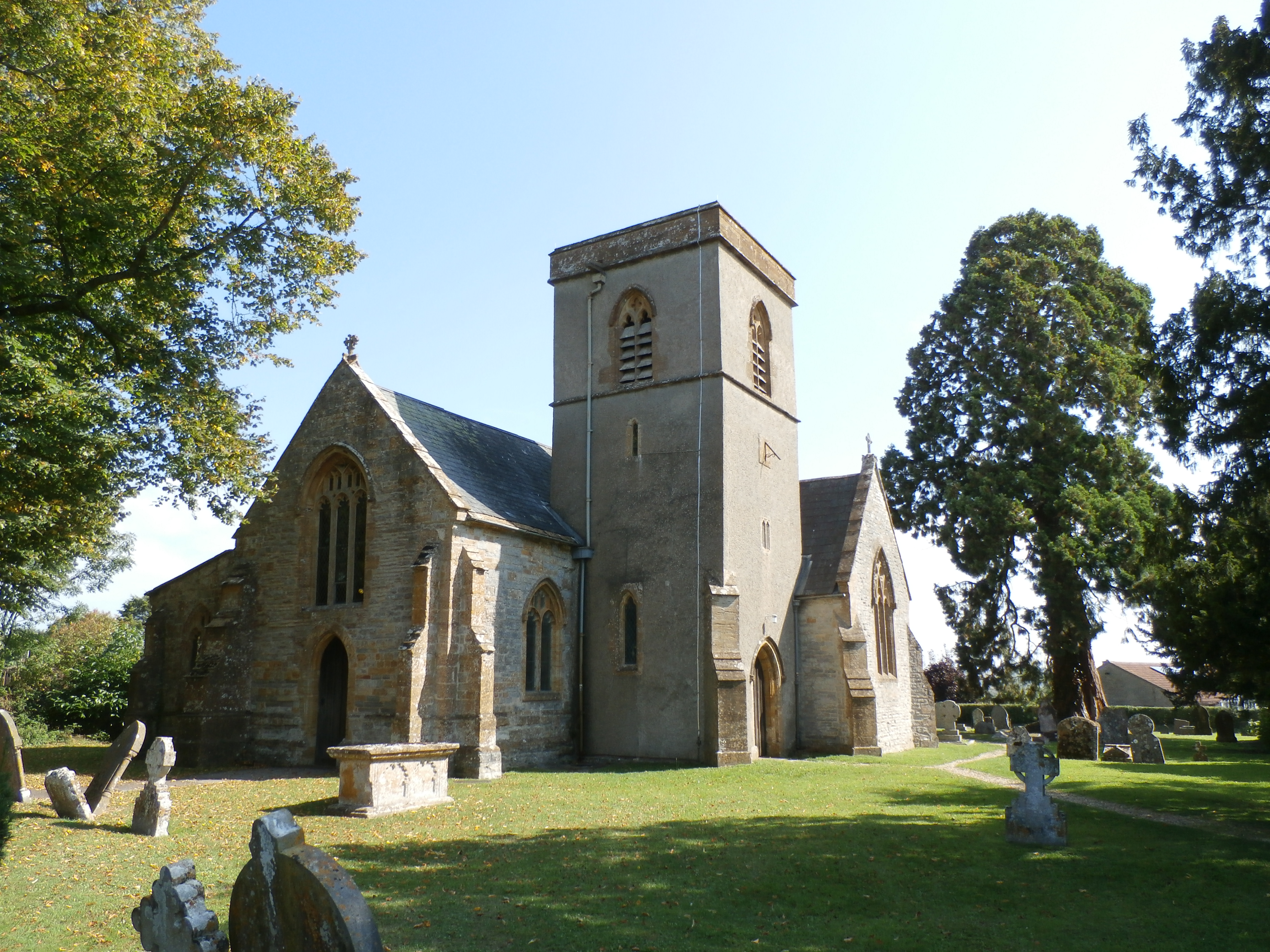

- Location within Somerset
- 50.9526°N 2.9240°W
- Location: Ilton, Somerset, England

History
- Built: 14th century

Listed Building – Grade II*
- Official name: Church of St Peter
- Designated: 4 February 1958
- Reference no.: 1057052

The Anglican Church of St Peter in Ilton, Somerset, England was built in the 14th century, incorporating fragments from 12th and 13th. It is a Grade II* listed building.

== History ==
The church was built in the 14th century, incorporating fragments from 12th and 13th which remain as part of the fabric of the building. The first church on the site was built about 800.

During Victorian restoration, by James Mountford Allen, in 1860 a new chapel was built and the chancel was rebuilt. A dilapidated spire was removed and the upper part of the tower built.

The parish is part of the Isle Valley benefice within the Diocese of Bath and Wells.

== Architecture ==
The stone building has hamstone dressings and a slate roof. It consists of a three-bay nave, two-bay chancel, three-bay north aisle, with chapel and a south transept. The two-stage tower is supported by corner buttresses. Above the tower is an arched doorway and next to the window a sundial. Within the tower are a peal of six bells which were rehung in 1963.

Inside the church are a piscina, 17th century pulpit and memorials dating back to the 15th century. These include memorials to the Wadham family, such as the chrysom brass effigy of Nicholas Wadham who died as a baby in 1508, son to Margaret Seymour (aunt of Jane Seymour) and her husband Sir Nicholas Wadham (died 1542).

== See also ==
- List of ecclesiastical parishes in the Diocese of Bath and Wells
