= Buckland Priory =

Coordinates: 51.0533°N 3.0092°W

Monastery information
- Order: Augustinian
- Established: c. 1167
- Disestablished: 1539

People
- Founder: William de Erleigh

Site
- Location: Durston, Somerset, England
- Grid reference: ST294286

Buckland Priory shown within Somerset
(grid reference ST294286)

Buckland Priory, also known as Minchin Buckland Preceptory or Buckland Sororum (Latin: "Buckland of the Sisters"), was established around 1167 in Lower Durston, Somerset, England.

== Priory ==
It was founded by William de Erleigh (or Erlegh) for Augustinian Canons. A local spring fed fishponds (or vivarium) and supplied the priory with water and drainage. The ponds were filled in by 1725.

The buildings burned down in 1234. The priory was later suppressed, and the estates given to the Knights Hospitaller. Subsequently, there was a priory of Canonesses of St. Augustine, and, in 1199 a preceptory of Knights Hospitaller, the Hospitallers' only house for women in England, who ceased to appoint preceptors after 1433.

Various endowments were made and by 1358 the estate consisted of 268 acres (1.08 km^{2}) of arable land, and 42 acres (170,000 m^{2}) of meadow.

== Burials ==
- Robert Hill (died 1423) and wife Isabel Fitchet

== Dissolution ==
At the Dissolution of the Monasteries Buckland was dissolved in 1540. The Hospitallers had granted a 50-year lease of their lands in 1539 to William Hawley or Halley. Following Dissolution Hawley received a lease of the property from the crown, and in 1545 together with Alexander Popham he purchased the freehold, then called "the manor and late preceptory of Buckland Priors". Hawley bought out his partner Popham later in 1545. In 1548 he held 300 acres of former Buckland Priory land. The property was later the seat of Sir Gabriel Hawley (d.1604), Sheriff of Somerset in 1584.

== Present day ==
The site of one of the buildings is now occupied by Buckland Farm a Grade II* listed building.
