= John Hill (died 1408) =

Member of the Parliament of England

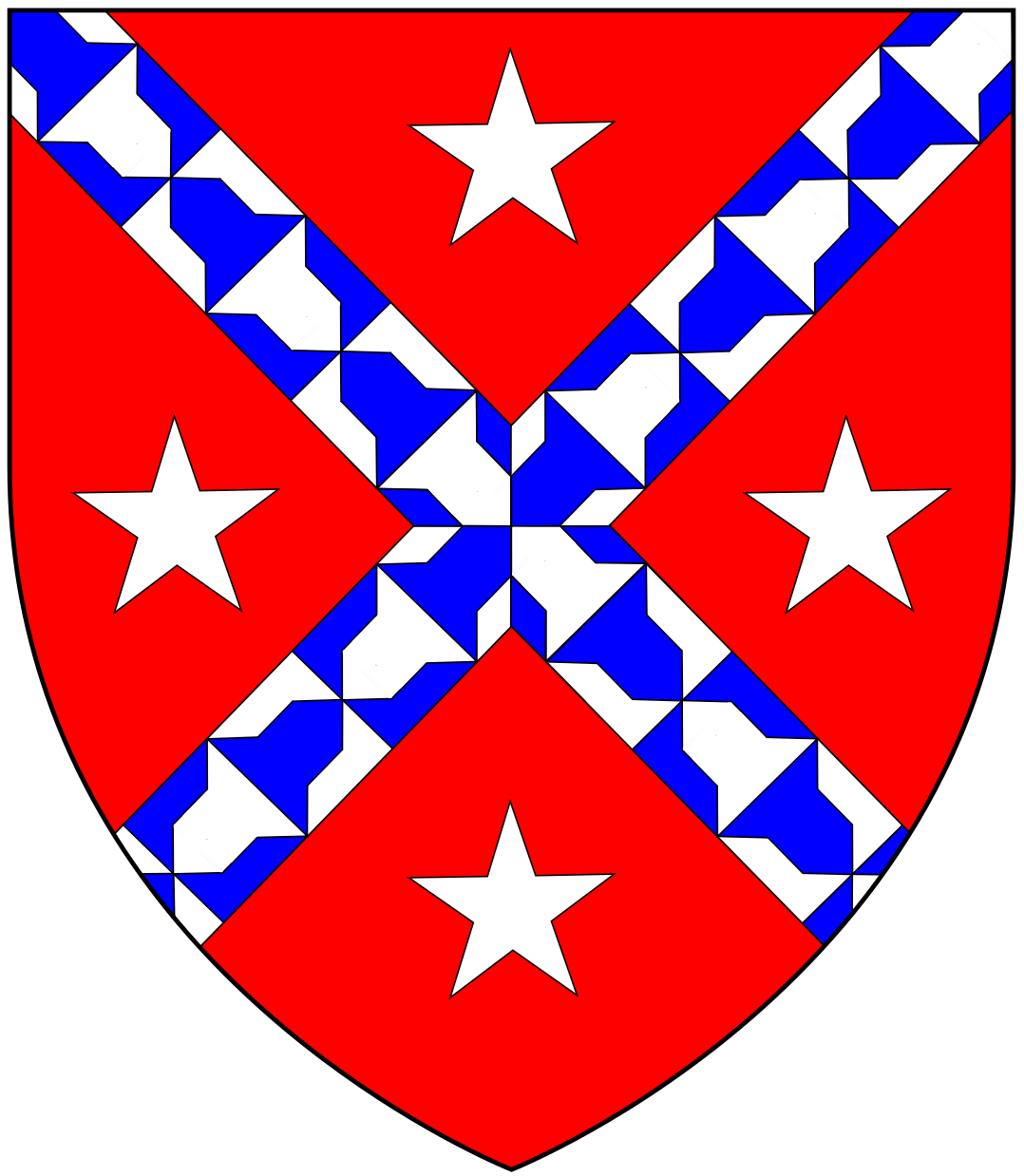
Arms of Hill of Hill's Court, Exeter: Gules, a saltire vair between four mullets argent These are similar to the arms as Hill of Houndstone, Somerset, one of whom was Margaret Hill, first wife of Sir Hugh Luttrell (d.1521) of Dunster Castle

Sir John Hill (died 1408) of Kytton in the parish of Holcombe Rogus, and of Hill's Court in the parish of St Sidwell in the City of Exeter, both in Devon, was a Justice of the King's Bench from 1389 to 1408. He sat in Parliament for a number of Devon boroughs between 1360 and 1380.

== Hill's Court, Exeter ==
Hill's Court was in the parish of St Sidwell in the City of Exeter, in Devon. In 1811, a Thomas Johnson died at "Hill's Court, near Exeter", as reported by the "Monthly Magazine" (Vol. 31). In 1822, Daniel and Samuel Lysons reported there being no surviving remains of the ancient mansion, and the site, on which several houses had been built, was by then the property of a John Newcombe.

== Marriages ==
Sir John Hill married twice:

Firstly to Denise Durburgh, daughter of Sir John Durburgh and widow of Sir Robert Chalons, of Challonsleigh (as his second wife)

By Denise Durbugh or Durborough he had children including:

- Robert Hill (c.1361-1423) of Spaxton in Somerset, four times MP for Somerset, in 1414, 1415, 1416 and 1419. From 1402 to 1404, Robert Hill was steward of the Dunster Castle estates of Joan, Lady Mohun, after whose death he retained close connections with the new lord of Dunster, Sir Hugh Luttrell (d.1428), his co-MP for Somerset in 1414 and 1415, and of whose will he was an executor.
- Joan Hill, who married four times.
    - Firstly to Sir John Malet, eldest son of Sir Baldwin Malet of Enmore, Somerset.
    - Thirdly in about 1408 to John Luttrell (died c.1421) of Carhampton, Somerset, MP for Barnstaple in 1406, Constable of Dunster Castle 1408-1421 for his Luttrell kinsman, feoffee for Hugh de Courtenay, 4th/12th Earl of Devon (1389–1422) and trustee of the Devon and Cornwall estates of his brother-in-law John, Lord Harrington.

Secondly, John married Maud Daubeney, daughter of Giles Daubeny of Barrington, and widow of Sir Henry Percehay of Chalsfield, Baron of Exchequer

By Maud he had issue:

- John Hill.
- Ralph Hill of Houndstone. married Edith Mode (Moody) of Gloster
- Elizabeth Hill, became a nun at Buckland Minchin, Somerset
- Margaret Hill, wife of William Harington, 5th Baron Harington (c.1394–1458), brother of John Harington, 4th Baron Harington(d.1418) husband of Elizabeth Courtenay(d.1471), daughter of Edward de Courtenay, 3rd Earl of Devon(d.1419).

== Death ==
Sir John Hill, Sergeant-in-Law and Justice of King's Bench, died June 24, 1408, and was buried in St John Baptist's Priory, Exeter; his 2 wives were buried there as well.
