= Listed buildings in West Harlsey =

West Harlsey is a civil parish in the county of North Yorkshire, England. It contains two listed buildings that are recorded in the National Heritage List for England. Both of these are listed at Grade II*, the middle of the three grades, which applies to "particularly important buildings of more than special interest". The parish contains the hamlet of West Harlsey and the surrounding countryside. Both of the listed buildings are associated with the ruins of Harlsey Castle.

== Buildings ==
Name and location	Photograph	Date	Notes
Harsley Castle Farmhouse; 54.37661°N 1.36310°W		Early 15th century	The farmhouse was built in the 19th century incorporating part of Harlsey Castle. It is in rendered stone and has a pantile roof with stone coping. There are two storeys and four bays, the right bay lower. The doorway has pilasters, a fanlight, a frieze and a cornice. The windows are sashes, those in the ground floor with flat stuccoed arches. At the rear is a small blocked window with a four-centred arched head.
Stables, Harsley Castle Farm; 54.37634°N 1.36281°W		Early 15th century	Part of the keep of Harsley Castle, later used as stables. It is in stone with one storey and three bays. There are two wagon openings and a smaller doorway, and inside, there are three chambers with barrel-vaulted roofs.
