= West Harlsey =

Hamlet and civil parish in North Yorkshire, England

Coordinates: 54.37683°N 1.36396°W

- Location within North Yorkshire
- OS grid reference: SE414981
- Unitary authority: North Yorkshire
- Ceremonial county: North Yorkshire
- Region: Yorkshire and the Humber
- Country: England
- Sovereign state: United Kingdom
- Post town: NORTHALLERTON
- Postcode district: DL6
- Police: North Yorkshire
- Fire: North Yorkshire
- Ambulance: Yorkshire

West Harlsey is a hamlet and civil parish in the county of North Yorkshire, England. The population as taken at the 2011 Census was estimated to be 40, and then in 2015, it was estimated at 30. Details are included in the civil parish of Winton, Stank and Hallikeld. It is situated near the A19 road, 3 miles (5 km) north-east of Northallerton.

From 1974 to 2023 it was part of the Hambleton District, it is now administered by the unitary North Yorkshire Council.

== See also ==
- Listed buildings in West Harlsey

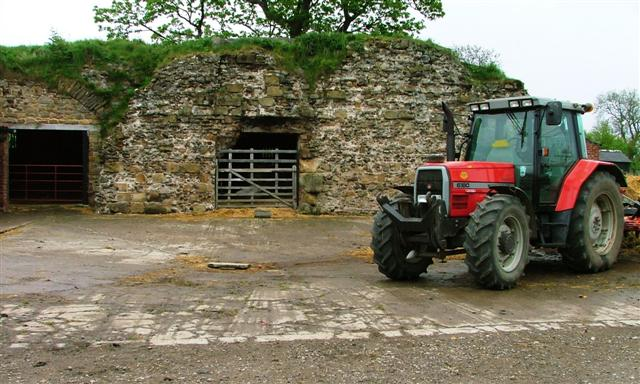
The remains of the 15th century Harlsey Castle, a listed building, have more recently been used as stables
