= Hugh Paulet =

English military commander

Arms of Poulett: Sable, three swords pilewise points in base proper pomels and hilts or

Sir Hugh Paulet (bef. 1510 – 6 December 1573) (or Poulet, his spelling) of Hinton St George in Somerset, was an English military commander and Governor of Jersey. counselor to Queen Elizabeth I 1500-1572

== Origins ==
Born after 1500, he was the eldest son of Sir Amias Paulet of Hinton St George, by his second wife, Lora Keilway/Laura Kellaway. He was the grandson of Sir William Paulet of Hinton St George, by his wife Elizabeth Denebaud, daughter and heiress of John Denebaud of Hinton St George. A younger brother, John Paulet (born c. 1509), became, in 1554, the last Roman Catholic Dean of Jersey.

== Career ==
In 1532, Hugh was in the commission of the peace for Somerset, and he was heir and sole executor to his father in 1538, receiving a grant of the manor of Sampford-Peverel, Devon. He was supervisor of the rents of the surrendered Glastonbury Abbey in 1539, had a grant of Upcroft and Combe near Crewkerne, Somerset, in 1541, and was Sheriff of Somerset and Sheriff of Dorset in 1536, 1542, and 1547, and was Knight of the Shire for Somerset in 1539.

On 18 October 1537, he was knighted by King Henry VIII, and was invited to the baptism of his son Prince Edward (the future King Edward VI) at Hampton Court two days later. In 1544, he was treasurer of the English army at the siege of Boulogne, and distinguished himself at the capture of the Brey on 1 September 1544 in the presence of the king. On the accession of King Edward VI, he was one of those charged by Henry VIII's executors, on 11 February 1547, with the good order of the West Country shires. In 1549, he was knight-marshal of the army raised by John Russell, 1st Baron Russell (later 1st Earl of Bedford) to put down the Prayer Book Rebellion. He led the pursuit against the rebels, and defeated them at King's Weston, near Bristol.

In 1550, he was a commissioner to inquire into the liturgy in the island of Jersey, and to put down obits, dispose of church bells, and to enact other Protestant reforms. He was shortly afterwards appointed Captain of Jersey and Governor of Mont Orgueil Castle, in the place of Edward Seymour, 1st Duke of Somerset. This office he retained for 24 years (according to Philip Falle).

From 25 April 1559, in which year he was made Vice-president of the Welsh Marches under John Williams, 1st Baron Williams de Thame, Hugh performed his functions through a lieutenant, his son Amias Paulet.

In 1562, when French Protestants surrendered Le Havre to Queen Elizabeth I, she commissioned Paulet as adviser to Ambrose Dudley, 3rd Earl of Warwick, who was to take command of the garrison and act as high-marshal. Paulet arrived in the Aide with Count Montgomerie and with £5,000 on 17 December 1562. On 1 April 1563 he conferred unsuccessfully with the Rheingrave, was sent to England in June, and returned on 14 July with eight hundred men from Wiltshire and Gloucestershire.

On 23 July 1563, he met the constable Montmorency, and on 28 July, articles for the surrender of Le Havre were agreed upon. On the 29th, the English evacuated Le Havre, bringing the plague with them to London. In November Paulet was one of the commissioners to settle the debts incurred in the expedition.

Sir Hugh was knight of the shire for Somerset in the parliament which met on 8 May 1572, and probably died in the following December.

== Marriages and children ==
He married twice, with children from the first marriage only:

- Firstly in about 1528 to Philippa Pollard, a daughter of Sir Lewis Pollard (c.1465–1540), Justice of the Common Pleas, of King's Nympton, Devon, by whom he had three sons and two daughters:
  - Sir Amias Paulet (1532–1588) a diplomat, Governor of Jersey, and the gaoler of Mary, Queen of Scots.
  - Nicholas Paulet, of Minty, Gloucestershire
  - George Paulett, Bailiff of Jersey from 1583 to 1611.
  - Anne Paulet
  - Jane Paulet, 2nd wife of Christopher Copleston (1524–1586) of Copleston, Devon, Sheriff of Devon in 1560, whose 1st wife had been Mary Courtenay, daughter of George Courtenay (who predeceased his father Sir William III Courtenay (1477–1535) "The Great" of Powderham).
- Secondly, before December 1560 he married Elizabeth Blount (d.1593), daughter of Walter Blount of Blount's Hall, Staffordshire, the widow of Sir Thomas Pope, founder of Trinity College, Oxford. Sir Hugh visited the college with her in 1560, 1565, and 1567, assisted the fellows in a lawsuit against Lord Rich in 1561, and made a donation to the college. She died without children in 1593, and was buried in Trinity College Chapel.

== Death and burial ==
Sir Hugh Paulet died of natural caused in his home on December 6, 1573. He is buried at St George Churchyard in Hinton St George, South Somerset District, Somerset, England. A monument can be found in the north aisle of the church at Hinton St. George, with the effigies of a man in armour and his lady, with an inscription, probably commemorates Sir Hugh and his first wife.
