= Case of the Swans =

1592 English property law decision

The Case of Swans
- Court: Exchequer of Pleas
- Decided: Trinity Term, 1592
- Citations: [1572] EngR 403; 7 Co Rep 15; 77 ER 435

Keywords
- prescription

The Case of Swans (1592) Trinity Term, 34 Elizabeth I, is a landmark decision in English property law.

== Facts ==
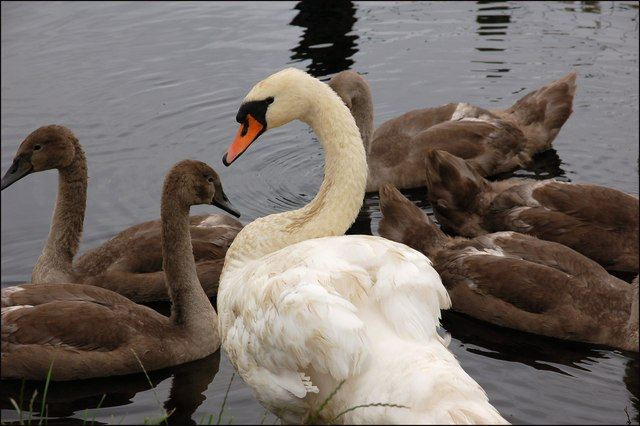
Swan and cygnets near the Newry canal in England.

Dame Joan Young (née Joan Wadham, sister and a co-heiress of her brother Nicholas Wadham) and Thomas Saunger received a writ from the Exchequer, directing the Sheriff of Dorset to round up 400 loose swans from the rivers of the county. Swans were Royal fowl, however, and a wild swan was considered the property of the monarch.

The right to these swans in Dorset had since time immemorial been held by the local abbot, who lost the right along with the abbey to Henry VIII at the dissolution of the Monasteries. Henry then granted the estate to Giles Strangways, Dame Joan's deceased first husband, whose heir gave them a right to the swans for one year. The new queen, Elizabeth I, now sought possession of the swans.

== Judgment ==
The question was whether the swans were Strangways's to grant or remained the queen's. Sir Edward Coke, as solicitor general, represented the queen.

The Court held that the swans that are ferae naturae, or wild animals, cannot be given by transfer or taken by prescription, thus remaining in the queen's possession.

== See also ==
- English property law
- Hunting licence
