= Melbury Sampford =

Village in Dorset, England

Coordinates: 50.852962°N 2.6051227°W

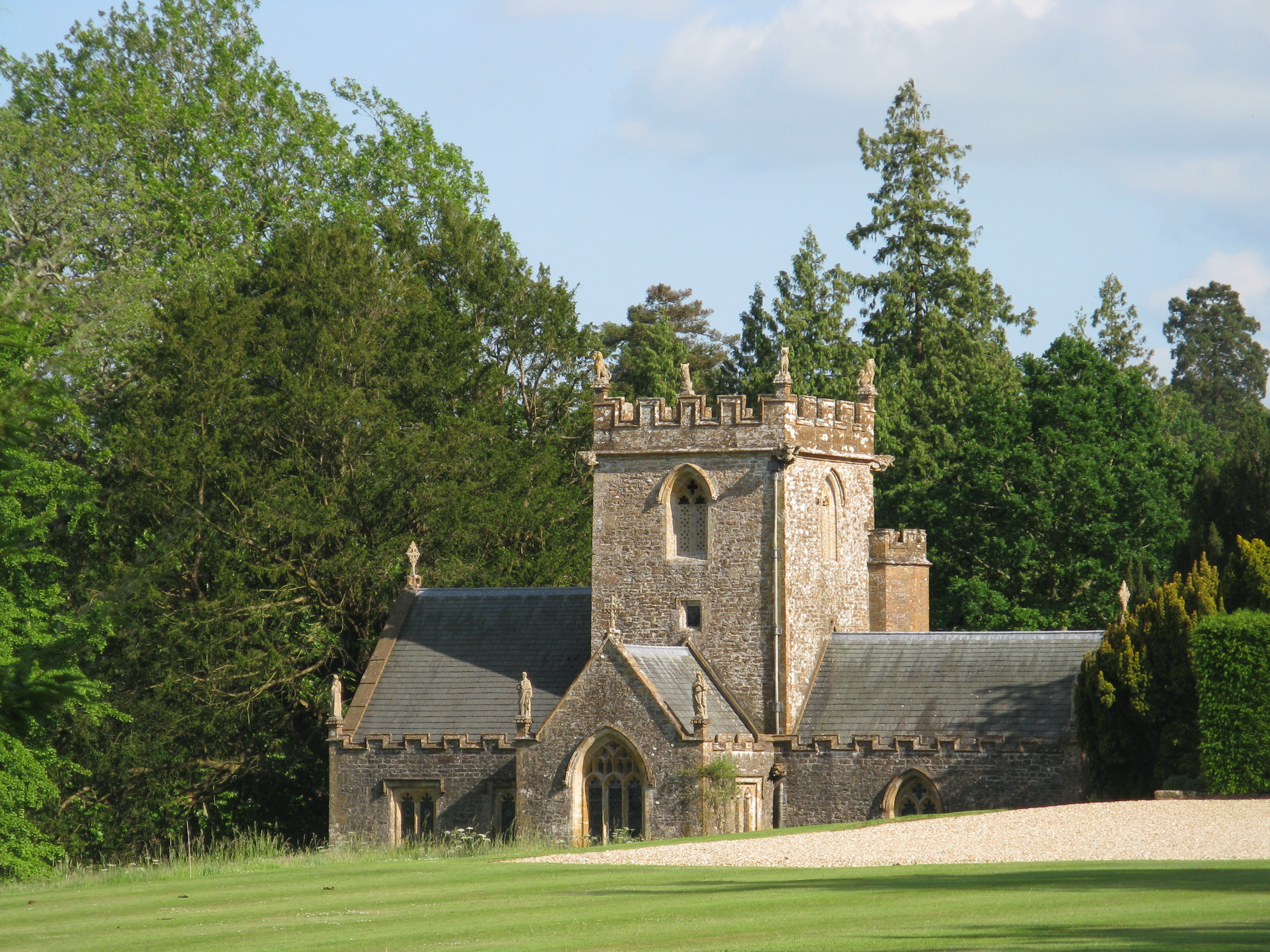

- Location within Dorset
- Area: 4.21 km^{2} (1.63 sq mi)
- Population: 38 (2021 census)
  - Density: 9/km^{2} (23/sq mi)
- Civil parish: Melbury Sampford
- Unitary authority: Dorset
- Ceremonial county: Dorset
- Region: South West
- Country: England
- Sovereign state: United Kingdom
- Police: Dorset
- Fire: Dorset and Wiltshire
- Ambulance: South Western

Melbury Sampford is a village and civil parish 12 miles (19 km) northwest of Dorchester, in the Dorset district, in the ceremonial county of Dorset, England. At the 2021 census, the parish had a population of 38 people in 17 households. The parish touches East Chelborough, Evershot, Melbury Bubb, Melbury Osmond and Stockwood.

== History ==
The name "Melbury" may mean 'multi-coloured fortification', the "Sampford" part is from the Saunford family.

== Landmarks ==
There are 12 listed buildings in Melbury Sampford. There is a church called St Mary next to Melbury House.
