= Giles Strangways (1528–1562) =

English politician

Arms of Strangways: Sable, two lions passant paly of six argent and gules

Sir Giles Strangways (1528 – 11 April 1562), of Melbury Sampford, Dorset, was five times MP for Dorset in 1553, 1554, 1555, 1558 and 1559.

== Origins ==
He was the eldest son of Sir Henry Strangways (died 1544), (who died during the lifetime of his own father, Giles Strangways, at the Siege of Boulogne), and his wife Margaret Manners, a daughter of George Manners, 11th Baron de Ros (c.1470-1513) of Helmsley or Hamlake Castle in Yorkshire, and a sister of Thomas Manners, 1st Earl of Rutland (c.1492-1543). In 1546 Giles therefore succeeded his grandfather in the family estates.

== Career ==
He was educated at Corpus Christi College, Oxford, and was knighted in 1549. He served as member of parliament (MP) for Dorset in 1553, 1554, 1555, 1558 and 1559. In 1557 he saw military service in France under the Earl of Pembroke.

== Marriage and progeny ==
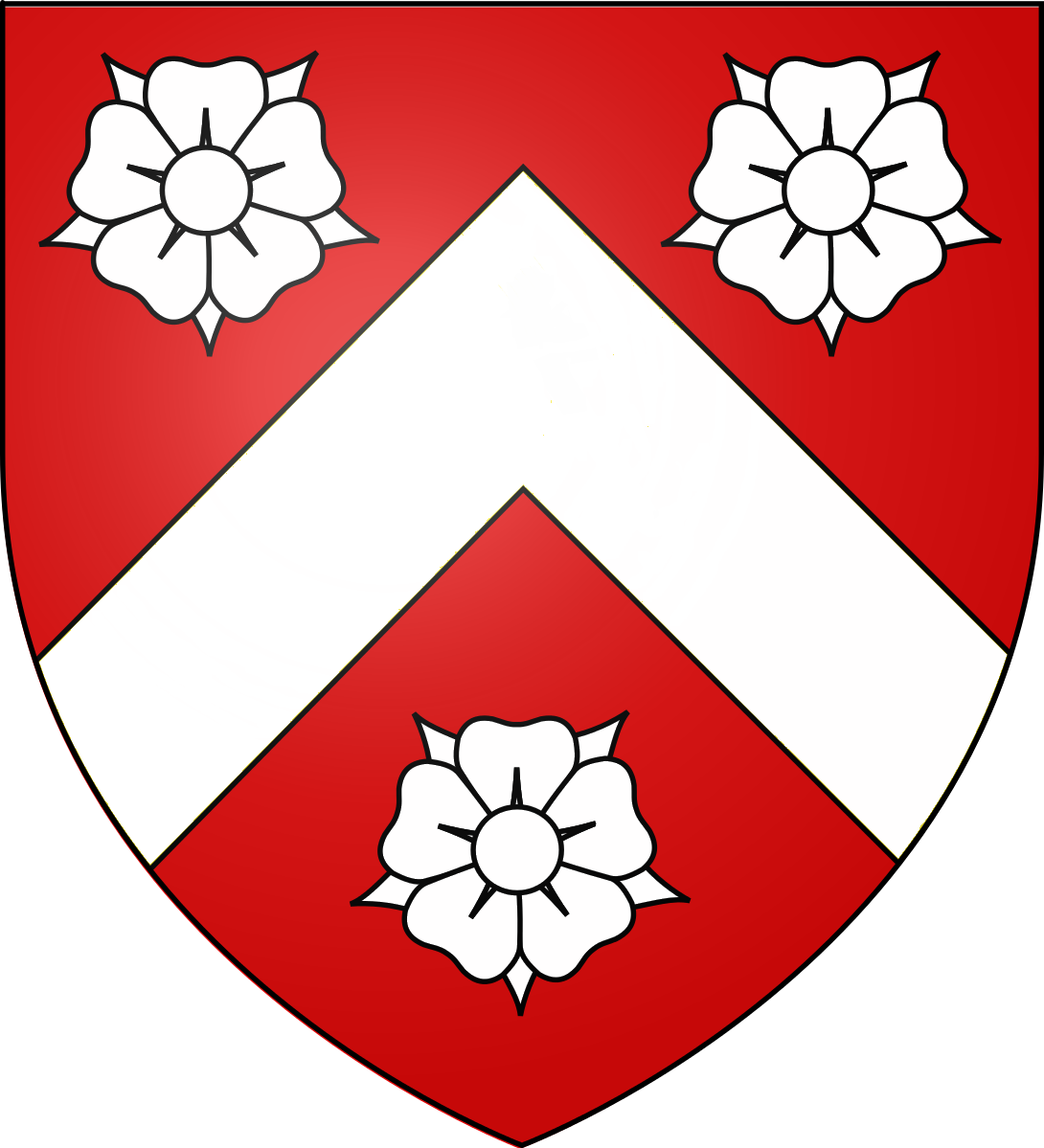
Arms of Wadham: Gules, a chevron between three roses argent

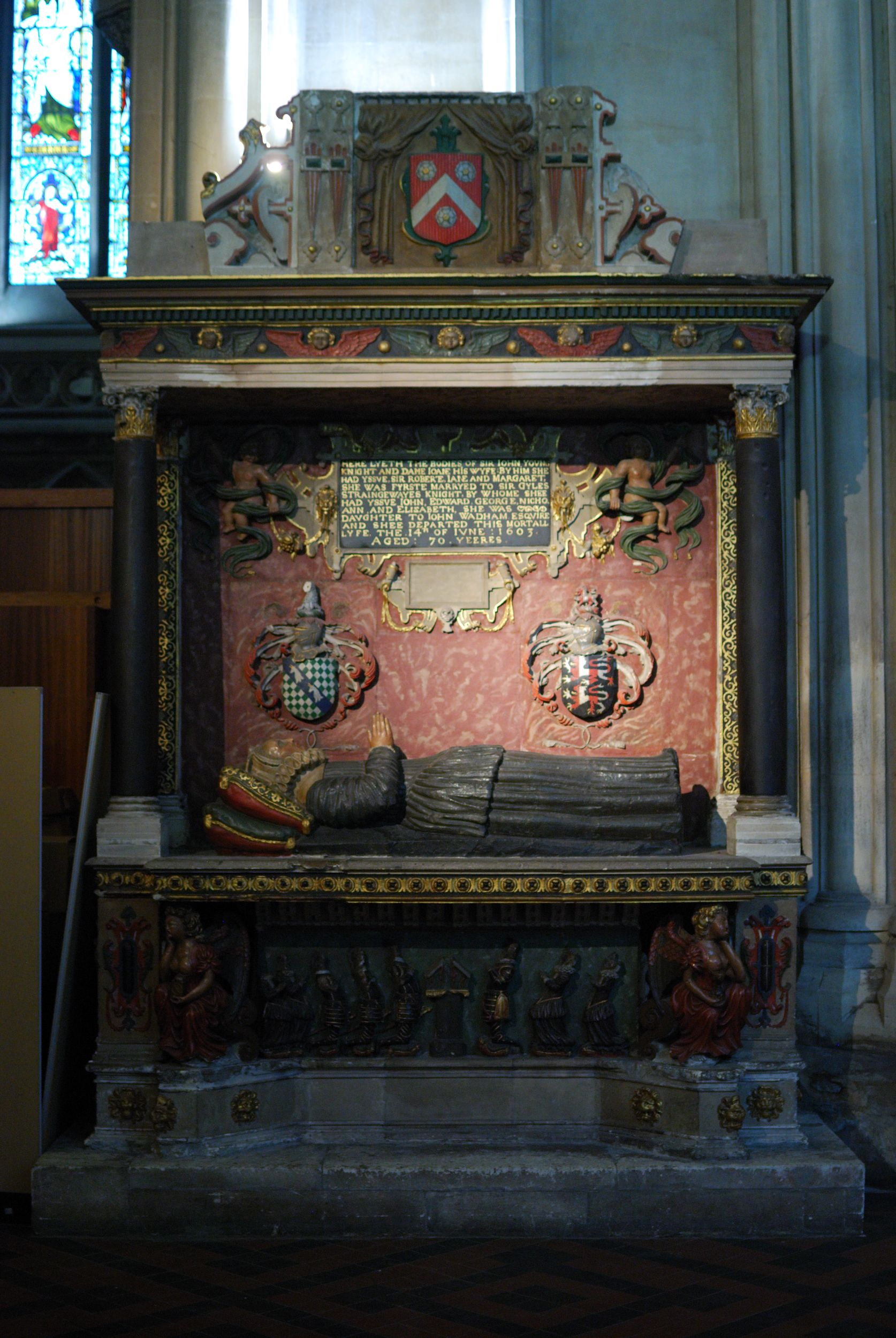
Monument with recumbent effigy of Joan Wadham (1533–1603), wife of Sir Giles Strangways, Bristol Cathedral

He married Joan Wadham (1533–1603), a daughter of John Wadham (died 1578) of Merryfield, Ilton, Somerset and Edge, Branscombe, Devon, and a sister and co-heiress of Nicholas Wadham (1531–1609), also educated at Corpus Christi College, Oxford, and co-founder with his wife Dorothy Wadham of Wadham College, Oxford. Sometime after 1545 he and Joan re-built the tudor period Melbury House. Joan later married Sir John Young MP, of The Great House, Bristol, and her effigy is included in her monument to herself and both husbands in Bristol Cathedral with the following inscription:

"Here lyes the bodies of Sir John Young knight and Dame Joan his wyfe. By him she yssued Robert, Jane and Margaret. She was fyreste marryed to Sir Gyles Straingwayes knight by whome shee had yssue John, Edward, George, Nicholas, Ann and Elizabeth. She was daughter to John Wadham esquire and she departed this mortall lyfe 14 June 1603 aged 70 yeeres".

She was in later life a defendant in the Case of the Swans. By Joan he had four sons and two daughters:

- John Strangways (c.1548-1593), of Melbury, Sheriff of Dorset, father of John Strangways (1585–1666), MP, an ultimate co-heir of Nicholas Wadham in 1609.
- Edward Strangways
- George Strangways
- Nicholas Strangways
- Ann Strangways
- Elizabeth Strangways

== Death and burial ==
He died in 1562 and was buried at Melbury Sampford.
