= Thomas Arthur (MP) =

English politician (died c. 1404)

Thomas Arthur (died c. 1404) was an English politician. He sat as MP in January 1397.

He also served as sheriff of Somerset and Dorset from 3 November 1397 till 22 December 1398 and 3 November 1399 till 24 November 1400.

He was the son and heir of Richard Arthur of Clapton in Gordano by Isabel, the daughter and heiress of Roger Turtle. Before 1381, he married Isabel, the daughter of John Stoke by his third wife Joan and they had three sons and one daughter. He was knighted before July 1373.

He also served as commissioner to determine an appeal from the captain of admiralty in Bristol in December 1385, commissioner of inquiry concerning assaults in Gloucestershire in July 1396, concerning Derley lands in Somerset in May 1399, concerning the concealments of property of Richard II and his adherents in Bristol, Somerset, Devon, and Cornwall in May 1400, and commissioner of array in Somerset in December 1399.
