= Nicholas Wadham (1472–1542) =

English politician (1472–1542)

Member of Parliament for Somerset
- In office 1529 - ?

Sheriff of Wiltshire
- In office 1516

Sheriff of Devon
- In office 1501; 1514

Sheriff of Somerset and Dorset
- In office 1498

Personal details
- Born: Before 1472 England
- Died: 5 March 1542
- Spouse(s): Joan Hill; Margaret Seymour; Isabel Baynham; Joan Lyte
- Children: 9
- Relatives: John Seymour (father-in-law)

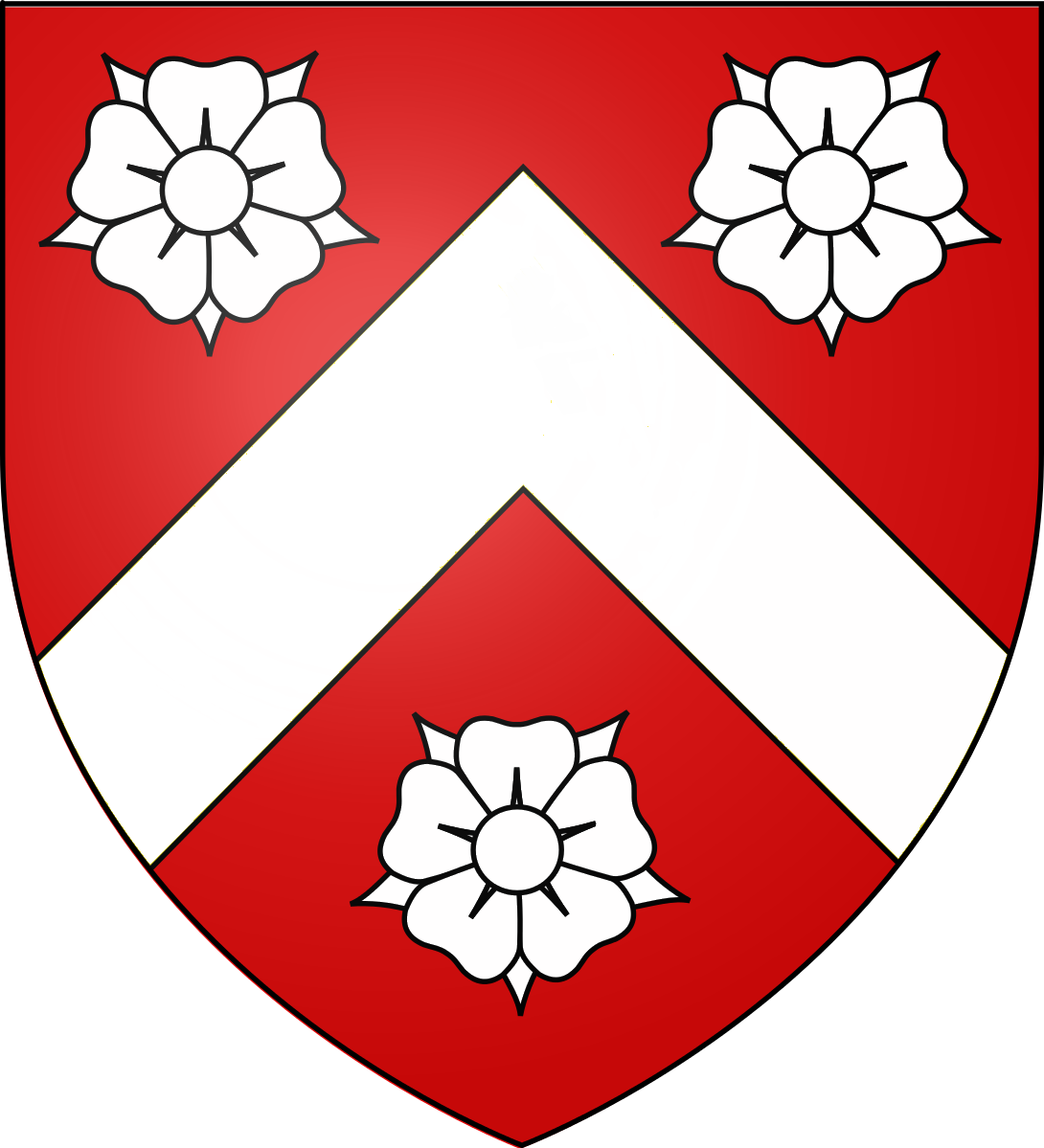
Arms of Wadham: Gules, a chevron between three roses argent

Sir Nicholas Wadham (before 1472 – 5 March 1542) was an English landowner, courtier, politician, and civil and military administrator from Somerset. His inherited landholdings over three counties included Merryfield in Ilton in Somerset, Catherston Leweston in Dorset, and Edge in Branscombe in Devon.

== Origins ==
Born by 1472, he was the first son of Sir John Wadham (died 1481), of Merryfield, and his wife Elizabeth Stucley, daughter of Hugh Stucley (died 1457) and his wife Catherine Affeton (died 1467). His paternal grandparents were Sir John Wadham (died 1440), grandson of the judge Sir John Wadham (died 1412), and his wife Elizabeth Popham (died 1476).

== Career ==
His first public appointment was as Sheriff of Somerset and Dorset in 1498, followed by a term as Sheriff of Devon in 1501. By 1503 he was attached to the royal court as an esquire of the body and, on 18 February 1504, he was knighted.

From 1509 to 1520 he was Captain of the Isle of Wight, responsible for the island's defence, and although he is not known to have fought in the French and Scottish campaigns of 1512 and 1513, as a commissioner of array for Hampshire from 1511 he held musters on the mainland at Southampton in 1512 and Portsmouth in 1514. As well as military preparations, he was involved in financial preparations as a commissioner for subsidy in both Hampshire and Somerset in 1512 and for Somerset alone in 1514, 1515, and 1524.

A second term as Sheriff of Devon followed in 1514, with appointment as a justice of the peace for Hampshire in 1515 and a year as Sheriff of Wiltshire in 1516. In 1520 he accompanied King Henry VIII to his meetings with King Francis I of France at the Field of the Cloth of Gold and with the Emperor Charles V. Made a JP for Dorset in 1521, both Sir Nicholas and his uncle, Sir Edward Wadham, were jurors in Bristol at the indictment for treason in May 1521 of Edward Stafford, 3rd Duke of Buckingham. in 1522 he was appointed Vice-Admiral to the High Admiral and in 1524, not having gained a legal qualification, received an honorary admission to the Middle Temple. In that year he was granted a patent "to make a park at Merifield of 200 acres of pasture and 40 acres of woodland".

After 30 years of public service, being in good standing with the chief minister Thomas Cromwell and, no doubt, with the king as well, he was chosen to stand as MP for Somerset in 1529.

In 1530, he was appointed one of the commissioners for making inquisitions into the estates of Cardinal Wolsey. After serving again as Sheriff of Somerset and Dorset in 1534, in October 1535 he asked Cromwell if he could be continue for another year, in order not to lose the revenues of the post, but his request was turned down. However, he was probably re-elected as MP for Somerset in 1536, when his link with Queen Jane Seymour, who was his niece by marriage, would have been relevant, and in 1540 was named JP for all the western counties.

He died on 5 March 1542. In his will made on 25 November 1539 and proved on 31 January 1543, which mentioned only assets in Somerset, he asked to be buried at Ilminster. He left to his fourth wife the silver, clothing and goods that she had brought to their marriage, together with much of his own jewellery and silver, livestock and grain. Leaving to each of his three younger sons, then living, 100 pounds and a horse; most of the rest of his goods were to be sold to meet debts and legacies. Among his executors were Sir Hugh Paulet and William Portman, while his supervisors were William Stourton and Sir Richard Pollard.

== Family ==
First married to Joan Hill, daughter of the MP Robert Hill, of Bridport, and his wife Alice Stourton, their known children were:

- John Wadham of Edge, who married Joan Tregarthen, daughter of John Tregarthen and his wife Jane Tretherf, and widow of John Kelloway, of Cullompton
- Giles Wadham, who married Agnes Clausey and had two children
- Andrew Wadham, who married Anne Saunders, daughter of Laurence Saunders, but left no children. He was "one of the Gentleman Ushers of the Queen's grace" to Queen Catherine Parr.
- Lawrence Wadham, who married Margaret Hody, daughter of Sir William Hody, and had a son Nicholas
- Mary Wadham, who married Sir Richard Chudleigh, of Ashton
- Elizabeth Wadham, who married first Sir Edward Bampfylde, of Poltimore, and secondly John Warre, of Chipley

His second wife was Margaret Seymour (died by June 1517), daughter of John Seymour (died 1491), of Wolf Hall, and his first wife Elizabeth Darrell. With her, his known children were:

- Nicolas Wadham
- Jane Wadham, whose husband was named Forster and lived at Baddesley, but later became a nun at Romsey Abbey

Others say that she was a nun before she married, hence the rhyme: "Mr. Foster of Baddesley was a good man, Before the marriage of priests began. For he was the first that married a nun, For which he begat a very rude son."

- Catherine Wadham, not mentioned in the Visitations but also a nun at Romsey Abbey

Thirdly, by June 1517, he married Isabel Baynham, the widow of Giles Brydges, of Coberley, and the daughter of Thomas Baynham, of Clearwell, and his wife Alice Walwyn. They had no known children.

His fourth wife was Joan Lyte, widow of William Walton, of Barton St David, and daughter of Richard Lyte, of Lytes Cary, with whom he had no known children.
