= Harlsey Castle =

Castle in West Harlsey, North Yorkshire, England

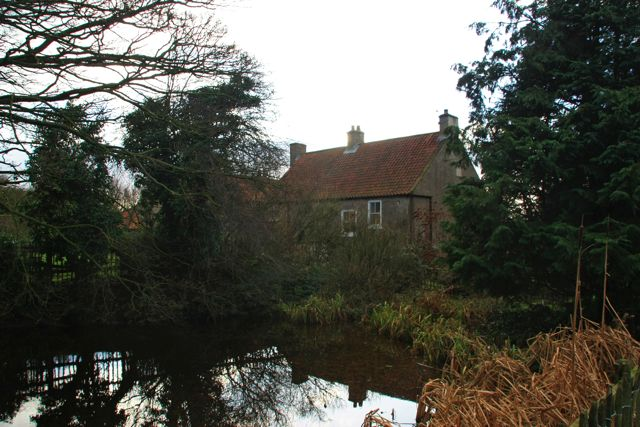
- The farmhouse in 2009, seen across the former moat

- Location within North Yorkshire

General information
- Location: West Harlsey, North Yorkshire, England
- Coordinates: 54.376°N 1.3629°W
- Year built: Early 15th century
- Renovated: 19th century (incorporated into farmhouse and stable)

Listed Building – Grade II*
- Official name: Stables at Harsley Castle Farmhouse
- Designated: 31 March 1970
- Reference no.: 1188946

Listed Building – Grade II*
- Official name: Harsley Castle Farmhouse
- Designated: 18 March 1983
- Reference no.: 1315142

Harlsey Castle was a fortified property in West Harlsey, a village in North Yorkshire, England.

In 1423, James Strangeways purchased the manor of West Harlsey, and according to John Leland, he then had the castle built. In 1570, his descendants forfeited it to the crown, and it appears to have soon fallen into ruin. In the 19th century, part of the former keep was incorporated into a stableblock, and another part of the castle into a farmhouse. Each of these structures is Grade II* listed.

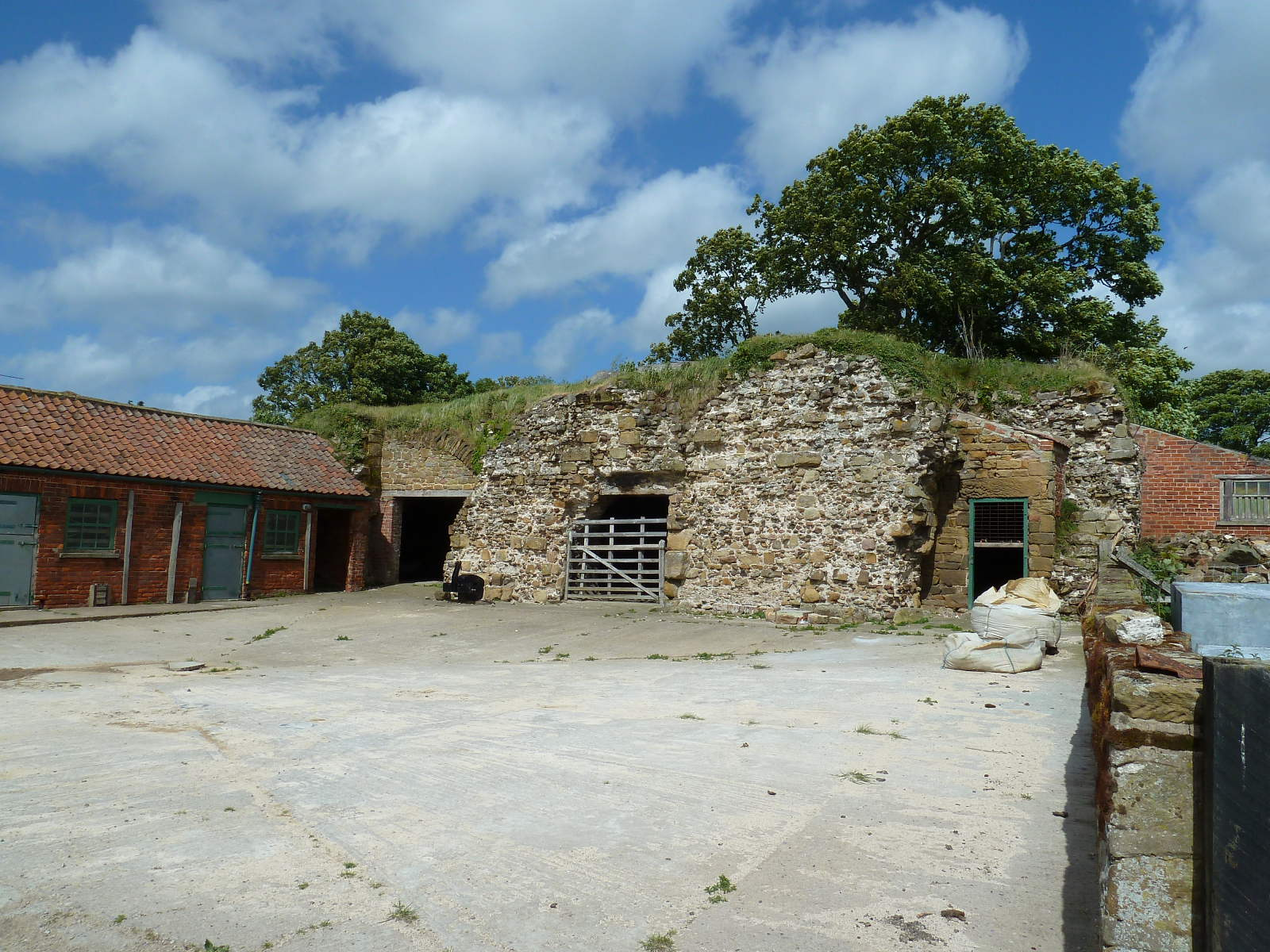
The stables

The farmhouse is built of rendered stone and has a pantile roof with stone coping. It has two storeys and four bays, the right bay lower. The doorway has pilasters, a fanlight, a frieze and a cornice. The windows are sashes, those in the ground floor with flat stuccoed arches. At the rear is a small blocked window with a four-centred arched head.

The stableblock is built of stone, and has one storey and three bays. There are two wagon openings and a smaller doorway, and inside, there are three chambers with barrel-vaulted roofs. The left-hand chamber has the remains of a large chimney.

== See also ==
- Grade II* listed buildings in North Yorkshire (district)
- Listed buildings in West Harlsey
