= John Rodney (MP) =

English politician

Sir John Rodney
- Born: date unknown
- Died: 19 December 1400
- Occupation: politician
- Years active: 1387–1388, 1391, 1396–1397
- Known for: Member of Parliament (MP); High Sheriff of Somerset and Dorset
- Spouses: Katherine; Alice
- Children: 4 sons, 1 daughter

Sir John Rodney (died 19 December 1400) was an English politician.

He was born the son of Sir Thomas Rodney of Backwell, Somerset and knighted by March 1373.

He was elected a Member (MP) of the Parliament of England for Somerset in 1391 and appointed High Sheriff of Somerset and Dorset for 1387–1388 and 1396–1397.

He married twice: firstly Katherine, probably the daughter of Robert Cheddar of Bristol, with whom he had four sons and a daughter and secondly Alice, the widow of John Fitzroger, Sir Edmund Clevedon and Sir Ralph Carminowe.
