= Ilton =

Village and civil parish in Somerset, England

Coordinates: 50.953305°N 2.919634°W

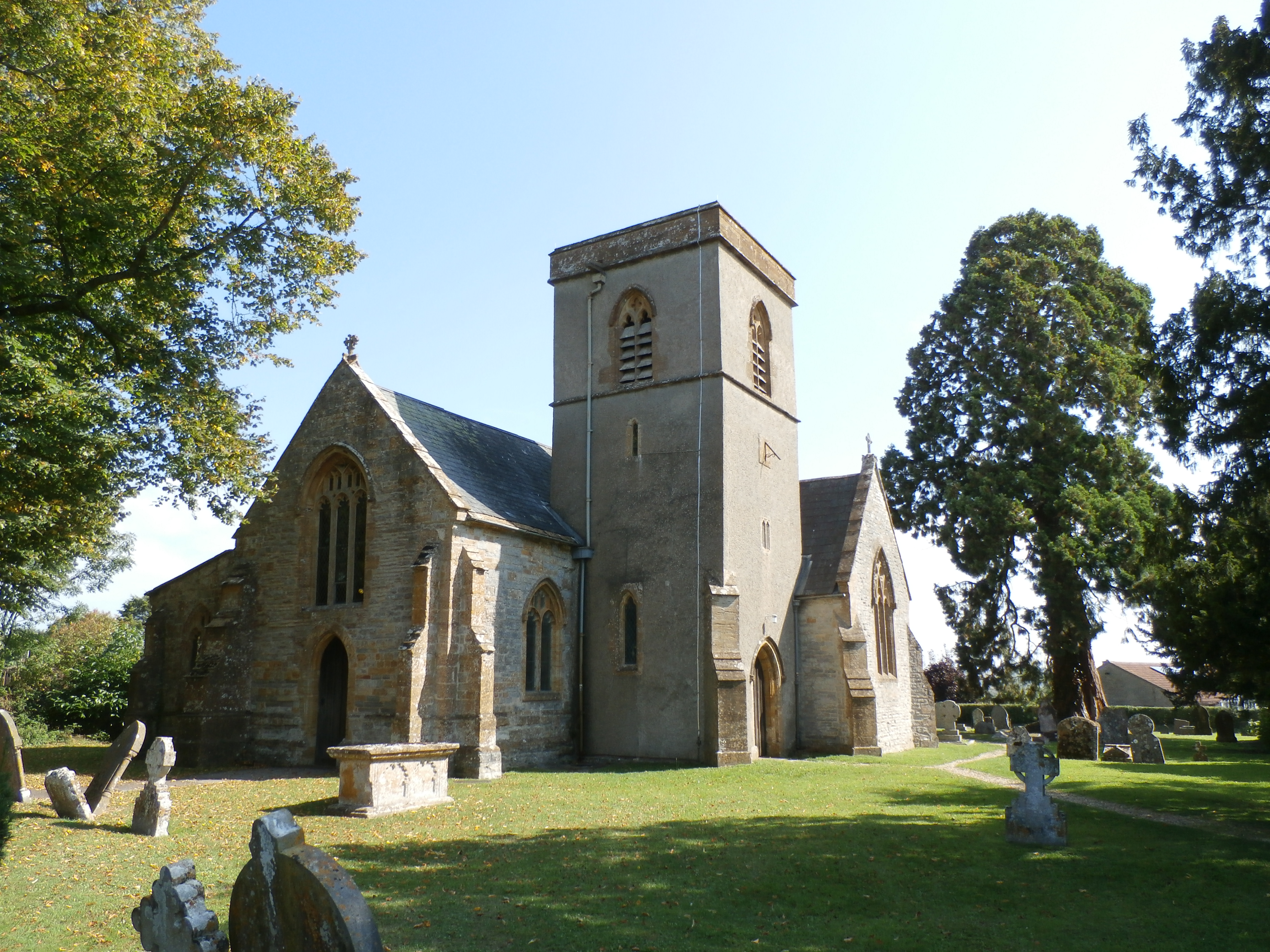
- St Peter's Church, Ilton

- Location within Somerset
- Population: 854 (2011)
- OS grid reference: ST355175
- Unitary authority: Somerset Council
- Ceremonial county: Somerset
- Region: South West
- Country: England
- Sovereign state: United Kingdom
- Post town: ILMINSTER
- Postcode district: TA19
- Dialling code: 01460
- Police: Avon and Somerset
- Fire: Devon and Somerset
- Ambulance: South Western
- UK Parliament: Glastonbury and Somerton

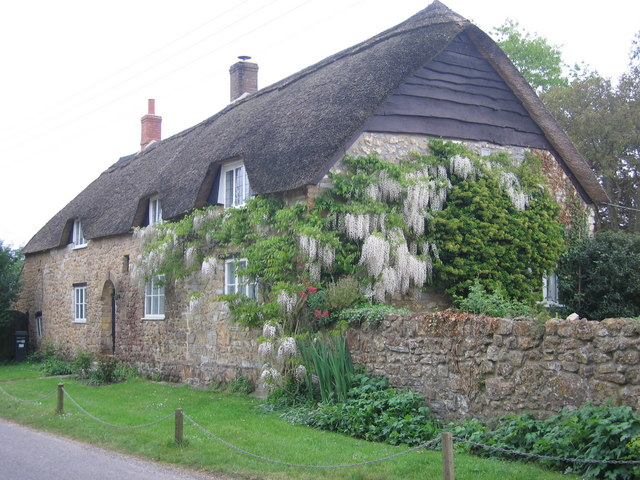
A thatched house in Ilton with wisteria

Ilton is a village and civil parish in Somerset, England, situated 8 miles (12.9 km) south-east of Taunton, and 2 miles (3.2 km) north of Ilminster. The village has a population of 854. The parish includes the hamlets of Ilford and Cad Green with its 16th-century almshouses.

== History ==
"The settlement on the River Isle" was one of the possessions of Athelney Abbey until the dissolution of the monasteries.

The current hamstone Ilford Bridge probably dates from the early 18th century when it was on the Curry Rivel to Chard turnpike road. The current A303 is just south of the village.

=== Historic estates ===
==== Cad Green ====
Cad Green takes its name from the nearby stream, currently called Cad Brook.

==== Merryfield ====
About 1 mile west-north-west of the parish church, situated between the disused railway line and the disused Chard Canal, is a moated site which is all that remains of the medieval fortified manor house of Merryfield (or Muryfield), which was the seat of the ancient Wadham family. The last of the family in the direct male line was Nicholas Wadham who, with his wife Dorothy Petre, founded Wadham College, Oxford in 1610.

Monuments to the Wadham family survive in the Church of St Peter, Ilton and also in the nearby Church of St Mary, Ilminster. The three sisters of Nicholas Wadham were (in their issue) his heirs, one of whom was Florence Wadham (died 1596), wife of Sir John Wyndham of Orchard Wyndham in Somerset, and mother of Sir John Wyndham (1558–1645).

The Wyndham family, which later commonly used the first name "Wadham", inherited the estate of Merryfield and the "Wyndham Estate" is still today the largest employer in the village of Ilton. It bears no relation to the present large 19th-century grade II listed mansion known as Merryfield House, immediately south of the parish church.

== Chard Canal ==
In the 18th century the Chard Canal was built close to the village. This had been intended as a part of a ship canal, passable by vessels of up to 200 tons, between the Bristol Channel and the English Channel, but was never completed.

== Merryfield Aerodrome ==
North of the village is the Merryfield aerodrome, which served as a bomber base in World War II, reopened as HMS Heron II, RNAS Merryfield and was then used for helicopter training.

== Ilton Halt ==
Ilton Halt was a small railway station on the Chard Branch Line between 1928 and 1962. It included a platform of concrete construction. During wartime (World War II) it also served the nearby Merryfield aerodrome.

== Governance ==
The parish council has responsibility for local issues, including setting an annual precept (local rate) to cover the council's operating costs and producing annual accounts for public scrutiny. The parish council evaluates local planning applications and works with the local police, district council officers, and neighbourhood watch groups on matters of crime, security and traffic. The parish council's role also includes initiating projects for the maintenance and repair of parish facilities, as well as consulting with the district council on the maintenance, repair, and improvement of highways, drainage, footpaths, public transport, and street cleaning. Conservation matters (including trees and listed buildings) and environmental issues are also the responsibility of the council.

For local government purposes, since 1 April 2023, the parish comes under the unitary authority of Somerset Council. Prior to this, it was part of the non-metropolitan district of South Somerset (established under the Local Government Act 1972). It was part of Chard Rural District before 1974.

The village is in 'Islemoor' electoral ward. From Ilton the ward stretches north to Fivehead via Beercrocombe or Hambridge and Westport. The total population for this ward taken at the 2011 census was 2,772.

It is also part of the Glastonbury and Somerton county constituency represented in the House of Commons of the Parliament of the United Kingdom. It elects one member of parliament (MP) by the first past the post system of election.

== Religious sites ==
The church of St Peter dates from the 14th century, and includes memorials to the Wadham family. It has been designated by English Heritage as a Grade II* listed building.

On the outskirts of the village is the well known gypsy camp which, in 2016, made national headlines with three brothers involved in a feud shooting resulting in the death of local resident.
