= Robert Hill (died 1423) =

Member of the Parliament of England

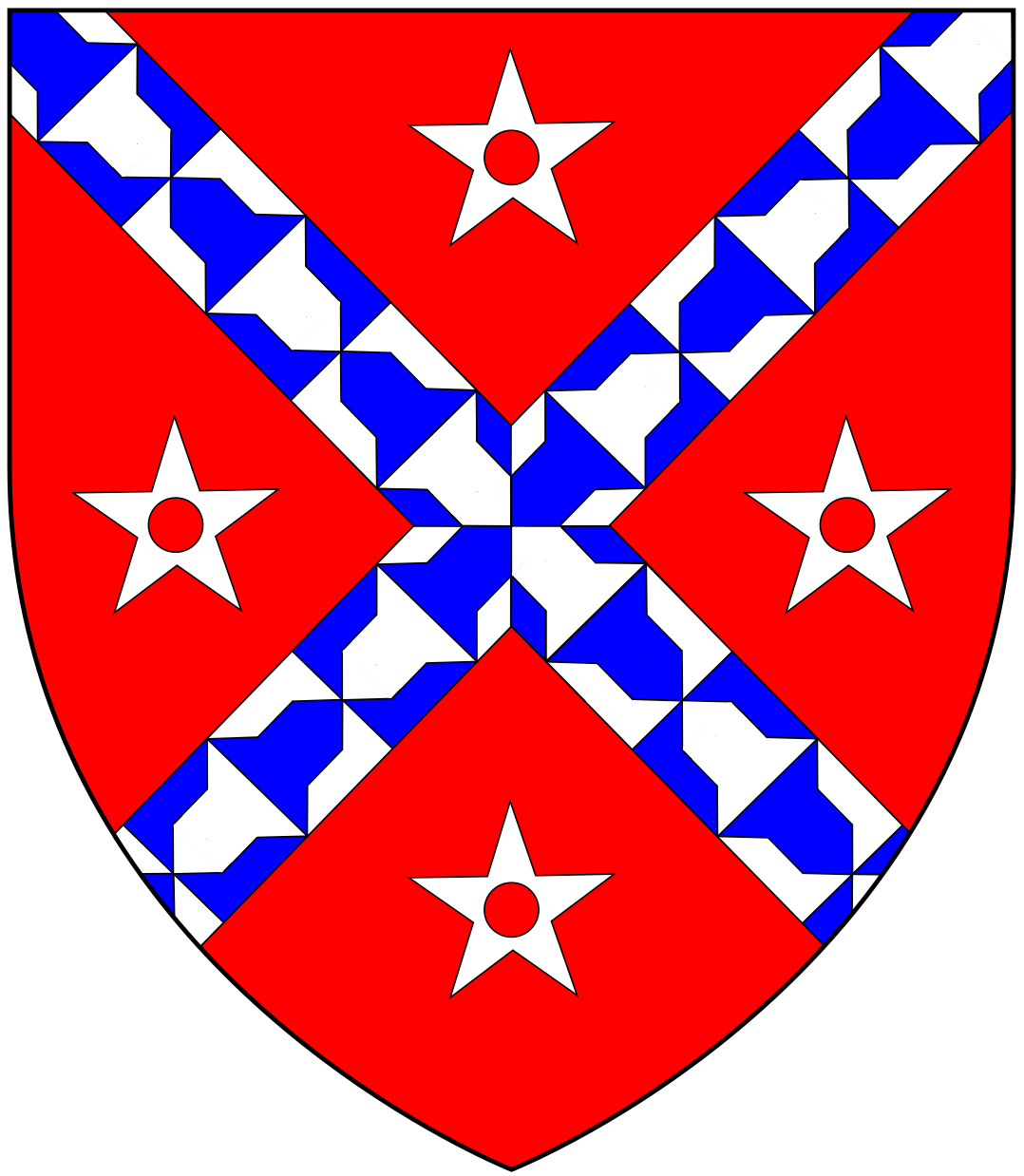
Arms of Hill of Hill's Court, Exeter: Gules, a saltire vair between four mullets pierced argent These are the same arms as Hill of Houndstone, Somerset, one of whom was Margaret Hill, first wife of Sir Hugh Luttrell (d.1521) of Dunster Castle

Robert Hill (c.1361–1423) of Spaxton, Somerset was four times MP for Somerset, in 1414 and 1415 jointly with Sir Hugh Luttrell (c.1364–1428) of Dunster Castle, and then in 1416 and 1419.

He was four times Sheriff of Somerset and Dorset in 1408, 1412, 1419 and 1422.

He was fined for refusing a knighthood.

Robert Hill of Spaxton died 25 April 1423 and was buried in Buckland church, ‘before and under the high altar near the middle' near his wife. He was succeeded by his only son, John Hill.

== Origins ==
He was the son of Sir John Hill (died 1408), Justice of the King's Bench from 1389 to 1407, of Kytton in the parish of Holcombe Rogus, and of Hill's Court, Exeter, both in Devon.

== Marriage ==
He married Isabel Fitchet, daughter and sole heiress of Sir Thomas Fitchet of Spaxton. They had children including:

- John Hill of Spaxton, b.1401 d.1434 MP
- Elizabeth Hill
