= Philip Falle =

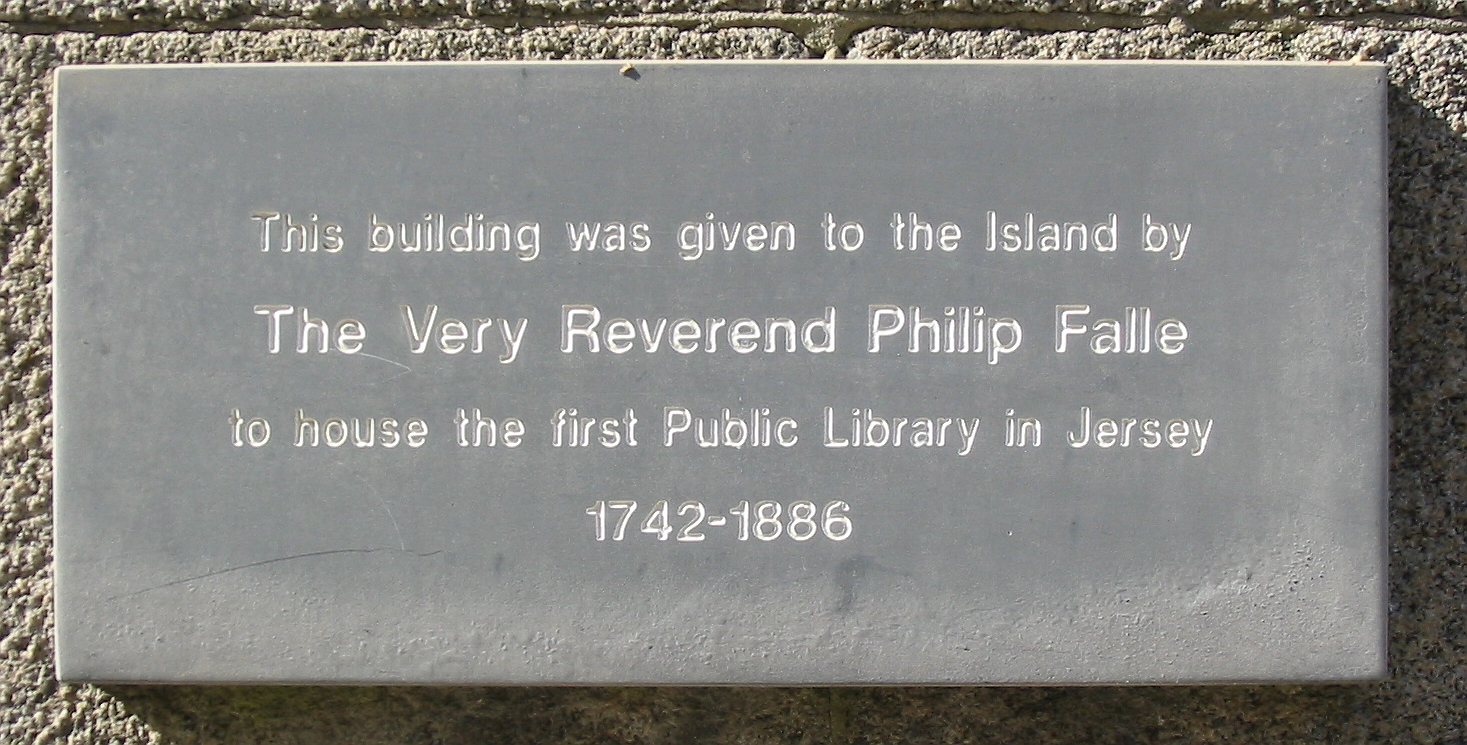
Plaque on the original library building in Saint Helier

Philip Falle (1656–1742) was a clergyman and historian of Jersey.

== Life ==
Falle was born in the parish of St. Saviour in Jersey. He was the eldest of four brothers, two of whom were killed in battle, and one, as a reward for service in the navy, was appointed first lieutenant of Hampton Court. Sent to England at a very early age, he was educated, first at a school kept by a Transylvanian in Great Queen Street, London, and afterwards by one Mr. Dalgarno at Oxford. In the winter of 1669 he was entered at Exeter College, Oxford, where his tutor was Narcissus Marsh; and on Marsh becoming principal of St Alban Hall, Falle migrated, and graduated there M.A. in 1676.

He was ordained deacon by Ralph Brideoake, bishop of Chichester, in the following year, and priest in 1679 by Guy Carleton, who had succeeded to the see. In 1681 he was presented by Sir John Lanier, then governor of Jersey, to the living of Trinity parish in that island. The stipend was £40 per annum; but Falle had inherited a small estate by the death of his father. He also undertook the care of the garrison, which was then without a chaplain.

In 1687 Thomas Jermyn, 2nd Baron Jermyn, who had succeeded Lanier as governor, took Falle back to England as tutor to his only son; and in that occupation he remained through the Glorious Revolution, living for the most part at Rushbrooke, Lord Jermyn's country seat, near Bury St. Edmunds. In 1689 he returned to Jersey, and was translated to the charge of his native parish of St. Saviour. Meantime the battle of La Hogue had been fought, and the French navy became dispersed, but formidable in maritime depredations. The States of Jersey, of which Falle, as Rector of Saint Saviour, was a member, made an appeal to William III for protection. Taking with him Mr. Durell, the advocate-general of the island, Falle went (6 February 1693) to wait upon his majesty at Kensington. Aided by Jermyn, and favourably received by Charles Sackville, 6th Earl of Dorset, the delegates pointed out the French danger.

In January 1700 Falle became a prebendary of Durham Cathedral. In 1709 he resigned his Jersey rectorship, having been collated to the benefice of Shenley, near Barnet. Falle died at Shenley, 7 May 1742, having never married.

== Legacy ==
In 1736 he presented to his fellow-islanders his collection of books. With another donation by Canon Dumaresq (died 1805), this benefaction developed into a large library, for which the States provided a building in Saint Helier.

== Works ==
Falle, as part of his advocacy for the defence of Jersey, wrote the first Account of Jersey (1694); in that year he was appointed royal chaplain, and preached a sermon on Queen Mary's death (20 December 1694). Around the same time Falle edited a history of the campaign of the battle of Landen in the Nine Years' War, by his friend and colleague the Edward D'Auvergne, rector of St. Brelade. His main work is based on materials from his friend Jean Poingdestre; but Falle was a poor historian.

In 1722 he contributed an account of the Channel Islands to Edmund Gibson's translation of Camden's ‘Britannia,’ and in 1734 brought out an expanded edition of his History of Jersey. Falle also published a few sermons.
