= Melbury House =

Country house in Dorset, England

Coordinates: 50.8520°N 2.6027°W

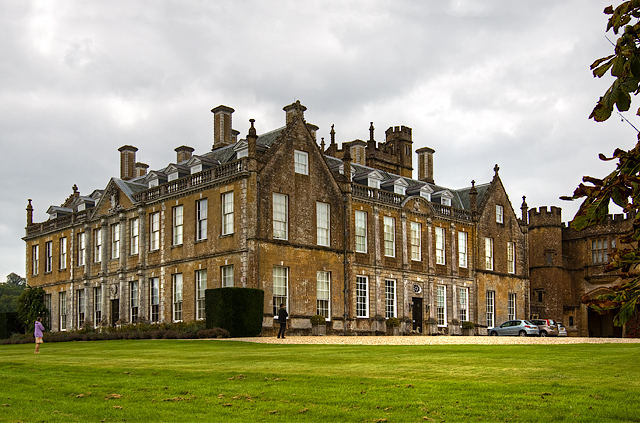
Melbury House in 2014

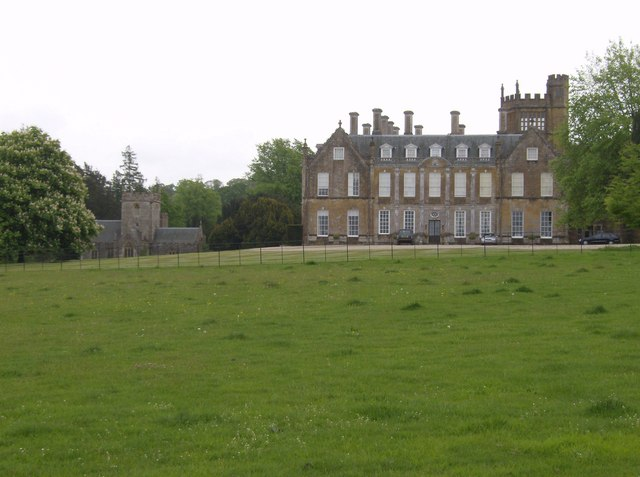
Melbury House and the parish church of Melbury Sampford

Melbury House is an English country house in the parish of Melbury Sampford near Evershot, Dorset. The Grade I listed mansion is the home of the Honourable Charlotte Townshend, a major landowner in east Dorset, through her mother, Theresa Fox-Strangways (Viscountess Galway), daughter and heiress of Harry Fox-Strangways, 7th Earl of Ilchester.

== History ==
Melbury House has been the seat of the Strangways family of Dorset since the estate was acquired in 1500 from William Browning (alias Bruning, etc.) by Sir Henry Strangways (c.1465–1504) who had married his widow. The mediaeval manor house of the Browning family was rebuilt after 1546 by Henry's great-grandson Sir Giles Strangways (1528–1562) using ham stone from a quarry nine miles away. Though Sir Giles lived extravagantly and encumbered his considerable estate with debts at his premature death, at Melbury he built a conservative house, "a courtyard with no frills", as Mark Girouard described it, "apart from the one gesture of its tower". This remarkable feature, a hexagonal tower, rises near the intersection of three ranges of buildings, filled above the level of adjoining roofbeams with banks of tall arched windows of many leaded panes that offer views in every direction over the rolling landscape of the park and the countryside beyond. Its roof has mock battlements.

It was altered and extended in 1692 by Thomas Strangways (1643–1713), under the direction of a certain "Watson", a local mason-builder who is probably to be identified with John Watson of Glashampton, Gloucestershire. It was further modernized in the 19th century.

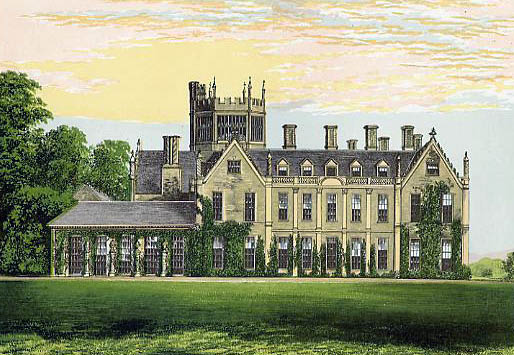
Melbury House, chromolithograph in Morris's Country Seats, 1880

The house passed to the Fox family from the Strangways heiress Elizabeth Horner, daughter and sole heiress of Thomas Horner (1688–1741), MP, of Mells Manor in Somerset, Sheriff of Somerset in 1711/12, by his wife Susanna Strangways, eventual sole heiress of her brother Thomas Strangways (d.1726) and a daughter of Thomas Strangways (1643–1713), MP, of Melbury House. In accordance with the terms of his wife's inheritance from her childless brother in 1726, Thomas Horner adopted for himself and his descendants the surname and arms of Strangways. In 1735, at the age of 13, Elizabeth Horner married 31 year-old Stephen Fox (1704–1776) (later Stephen Fox-Strangways, 1st Earl of Ilchester), eldest surviving son of Sir Stephen Fox (1627–1716), the first Paymaster of the Forces, deemed the "richest commoner in the three kingdoms". In 1758 Stephen Fox also assumed the additional surname and arms of Strangways, in accordance with the terms of his wife's inheritance. In 1741 he was raised to the peerage of Great Britain as Baron Ilchester of Ilchester in the County of Somerset and Baron Strangways of Woodford in the County of Dorset; In 1747 he was created Baron Ilchester and Stavordale of Redlynch, in the County of Somerset, and in 1756 he was even further honoured when he was made Earl of Ilchester.

When Horace Walpole visited Melbury, he admired the paintings and tapestries in "apartments most richly and abundantly furnished". The pioneer of photography Henry Fox Talbot was born in the house. Thomas Hardy made use of Melbury House, as "King's Hintock Court", for passing mentions in "The Duke's Reappearance" in A Changed Man and Other Tales and in A Group of Noble Dames, 1891.

== The buildings ==
The house and its stable yard to the north are Grade I listed buildings.

The landscaped gardens are Grade II* listed in the National Register of Historic Parks and Gardens.

== Notable residents ==
- John Browning (died 1416), MP
