= Wyndham (surname) =

Wyndham is a surname, and may refer to:

== Wyndham family of England ==
- Sir Thomas Wyndham of Felbrigg (c. 1466 – c. 1522), English sea captain and vice-admiral
- Thomas Wyndham (Royal Navy officer) (1508–1554), English soldier and sailor
- Sir John Wyndham (1558–1645) of Orchard Wyndham, Somerset, English defence organiser; son of Florence Wadham, Lady Wyndham (died 1596)
- Sir Hugh Wyndham (judge) (1602–1684), English judge
- Sir Wadham Wyndham (judge) (1609–1668), English judge
- Sir William Wyndham, 1st Baronet, of Orchard Wyndham (c. 1632–1683), English politician, Member of Parliament (MP) for Somerset 1656–1658 and for Taunton 1660–1679
- Thomas Wyndham (c. 1642–1689) of Witham Friary, Somerset, MP for Wells, Somerset
- Sir Edward Wyndham, 2nd Baronet (c. 1667–1695), English politician
- Thomas Wyndham, 1st Baron Wyndham (1681–1745) title in the Peerage of Ireland
- Charles William Wyndham (1760–1828), English Member of Parliament (MP) for Midhurst 1790–95, New Shoreham 1795–1802, and Sussex 1807–1812
- Sir Charles Wyndham (1638–1706), MP for Southampton (1679–1689 and 1689–1698) and St Ives (1698–1701)
- Sir William Wyndham, 3rd Baronet (1687–1740), English politician, Chancellor of the Exchequer 1713–1714
- Charles Wyndham, 2nd Earl of Egremont (1710–1763), British peer
- Percy Wyndham-O'Brien, 1st Earl of Thomond (c. 1713–1774), MP and Irish peer
- Henry Penruddocke Wyndham (1736–1819), British politician and topographer
- Wadham Wyndham (army officer) (1737–1812), English colonel and bon vivant
- William Windham (1750–1810), British Whig statesman
- George Wyndham, 3rd Earl of Egremont (1751–1837), British peer
- Dr Thomas Wyndham (1772–1862), English clergyman
- Wadham Wyndham (parliamentarian) (1773–1843), MP for Salisbury 1818–1833, 1835–1843
- George Wyndham, 1st Baron Leconfield (1787–1869), British peer
- Henry Wyndham (1790–1860), MP for West Cumberland 1857–1860
- Wadham Wyndham (political supporter) (1793–1849), DL, JP, and political supporter
- William Wyndham (1796–1862), MP for South Wiltshire 1852–1859
- Charles Wyndham (1796–1866), MP for West Sussex 1841–1847
- Henry Wyndham, 2nd Baron Leconfield (1830–1901), British peer
- Percy Wyndham (1835–1911), British politician
- Sir Hugh Wyndham (1836–1916), British diplomat
- Lt-Colonel Alfred Wyndham (1836–1914), British and Canadian army officer, pioneering rancher in Ontario and Alberta, Canada
- George Wyndham (1863–1913), British political figure and writer
- Lt.-Col. Guy Wyndham (1865–1941), soldier
- Charles Wyndham, 3rd Baron Leconfield (1872–1952), British peer
- Dr. Sir Harold Wyndham (1903–1988), Australian educator and public servant
- John Wyndham, 6th Baron Leconfield (1920–1972), British peer
- Francis Wyndham (writer) (1924–2017), British author and journalist, son of Lt Col Guy Wyndham
- Max Wyndham, 2nd Baron Egremont (born 1948), British author

== Others with the surname ==
- Anne Wyndham (born 1951), American television actress
- Charles Wyndham (actor) (1837–1919), English actor (who assumed the name) and founded Wyndham's Theatre in the West End
- Dennis Wyndham (1887–1973), South African-born actor in Britain
- Frederick W. Wyndham (1853–1930), British actor and producer, managing director of Howard & Wyndham theatres in Scotland and England
- John Wyndham, pen name of English author John Wyndham Harris (1903–1969)
- Martyn Wyndham-Read, musician
- Robert Henry Wyndham (1814–1894), British actor-manager, father of Frederick W. Wyndham
- Valerie Wyndham, ring name of American professional wrestling valet Paige Mayo (born 1986)
- Victoria Wyndham (born 1945), Mexican-American actress

== See also ==
- Windham (surname)
