= Wadham Wyndham =

Wadham Wyndham may refer to:

- Wadham Wyndham (judge) (1609-1668), British judge
- Wadham Penruddock Wyndham (1773-1843), British Member of Parliament
- Wadham Wyndham (army officer) (1737-1812), British army officer
- Wadham Wyndham (political supporter) (1793-1849), British political supporter
