= John Wyndham (1558–1645) =

English landowner (1558–1645)

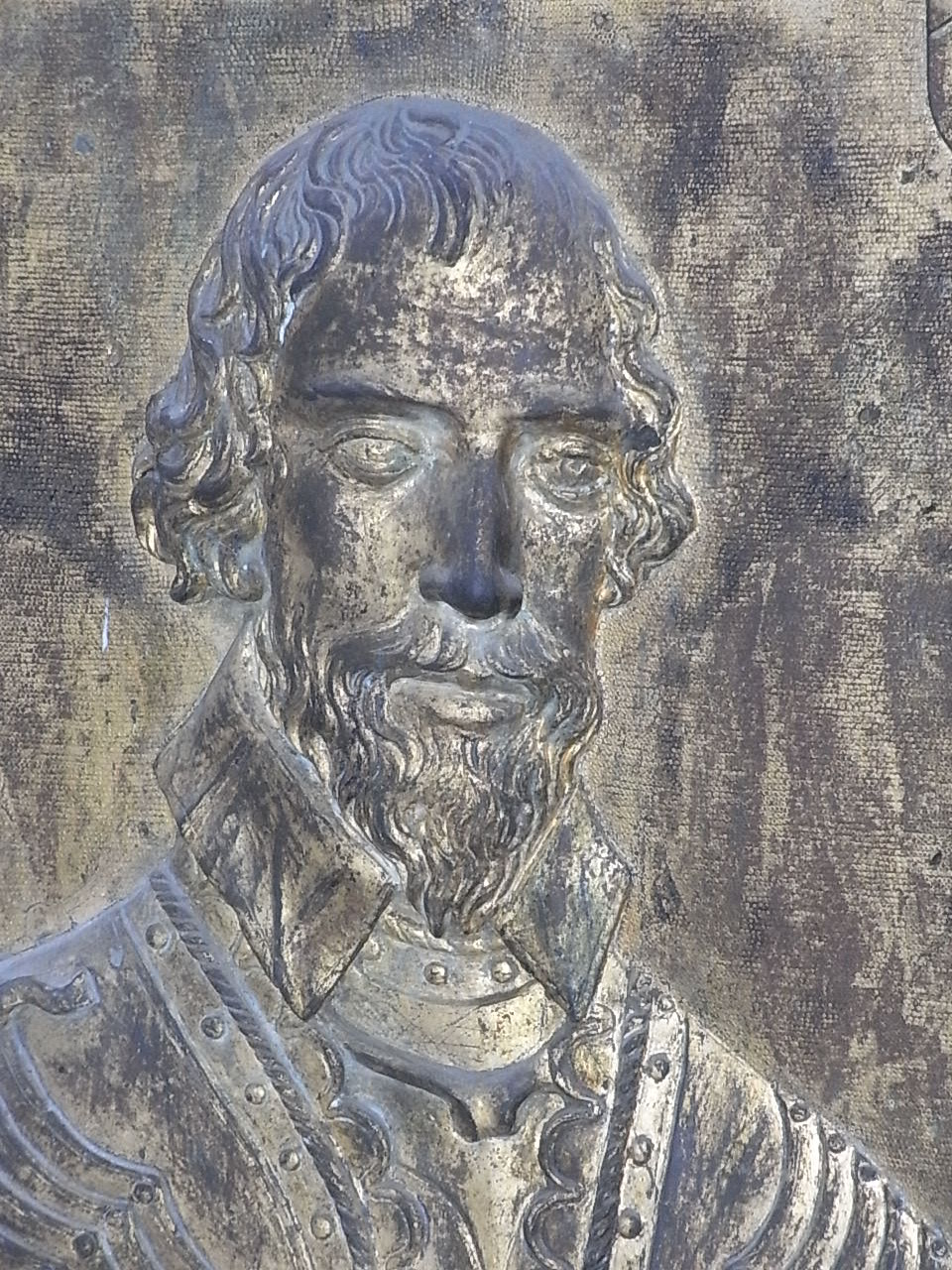
Sir John Wyndham, gilt-bronze cast relief plaque, on his purbeck marble slab, east wall of north aisle, St Decuman's Church, Watchet, Somerset

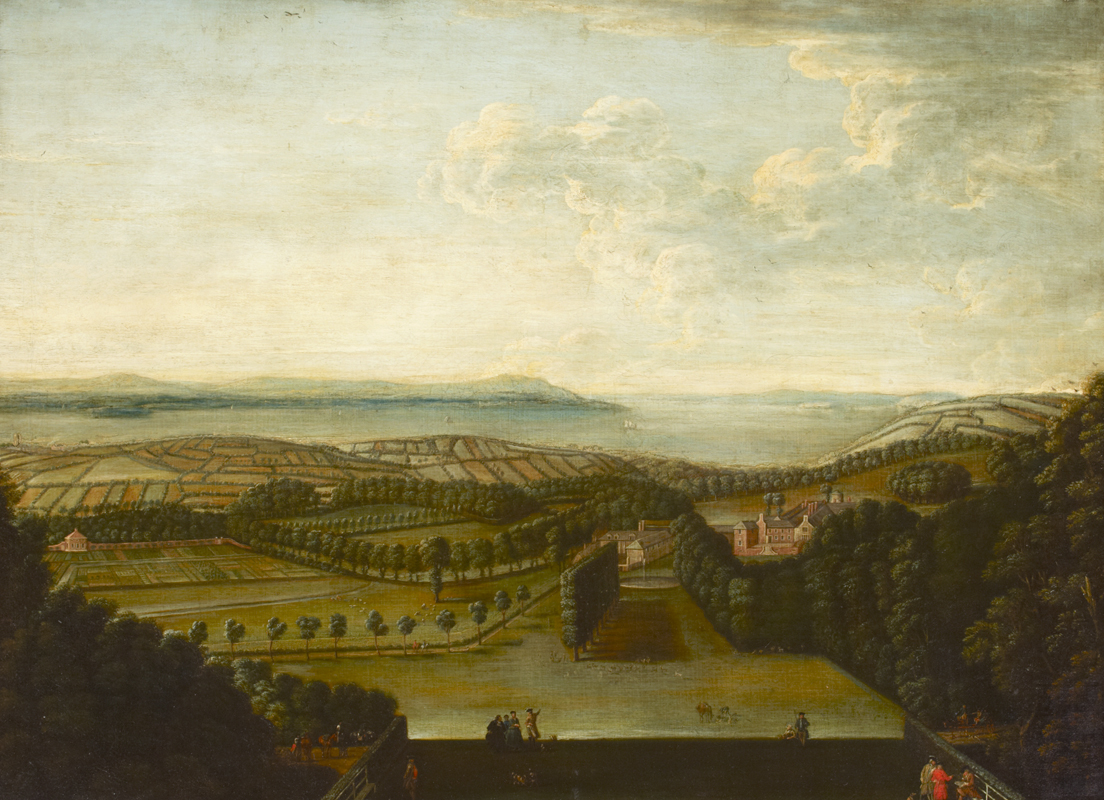
Orchard Wyndham: Sir John Wyndham's birthplace

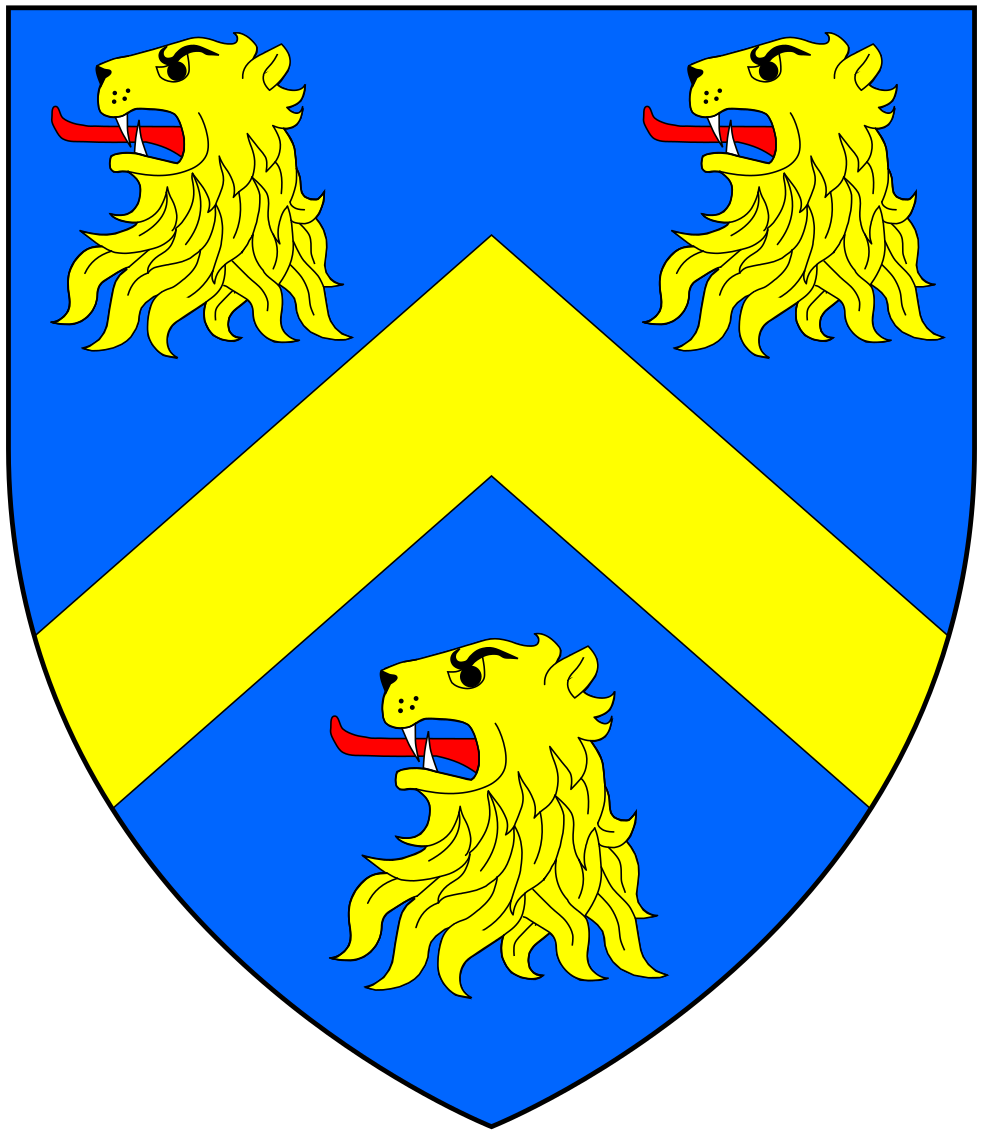
Arms of Wyndham: Azure, a chevron between three lion's heads erased or

Sir John Wyndham JP (1558 – 1 April 1645), of Orchard Wyndham in the parish of Watchet in Somerset, was an English landowner who played an important role in the establishment of defence organisation in the West Country against the threat of Spanish invasion.

== Origins ==
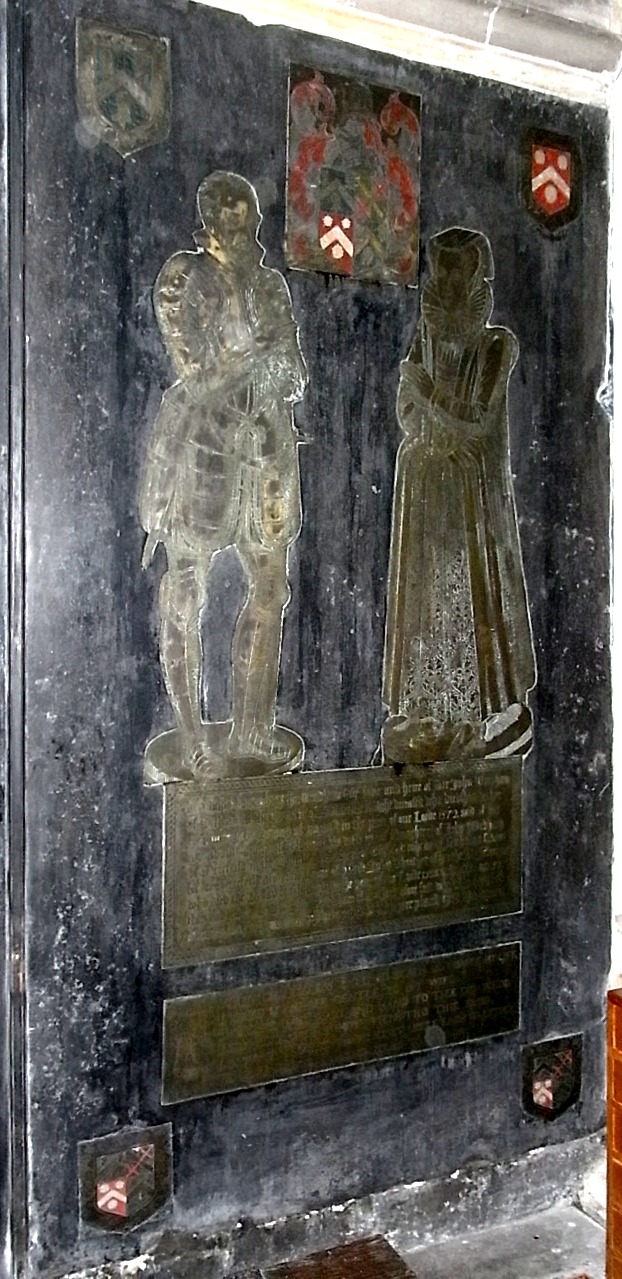
Monumental brasses in St Decuman's Church, Watchet, set into slabs of Portland marble, to Sir John Wyndham (d. 1572), of Orchard Wyndham and his wife Florence Wadham (1538–1597), erected by their son Sir John Wyndham (1558–1645). Displaying the arms of Wyndham and Wadham Gules, a chevron between three roses argent

He was born at Orchard Wyndham, the only child and heir of Sir John Wyndham (d. 1572) of Orchard Wyndham, by his wife Florence Wadham (1538–1597), a co-heiress of her brother Nicholas Wadham (1531/2–1609), of Merryfield, Ilton, in Somerset and of Edge, Branscombe, in Devon, who with his wife Dorothy Petre (1534/5–1618), eldest daughter of Sir William Petre, principal secretary to King Henry VIII, founded Wadham College, Oxford.

In memory of his parents, Sir John erected a pair of almost life-size monumental brasses in St Decuman's Church, Watchet, and also erected an almost identical pair (considered the finest of their style in England), also set into Purbeck marble, in memory of his uncle Nicholas Wadham and his wife on their chest tomb in the Wadham Chapel in the Church of St Mary, Ilminster.

Sir John Wyndham was one of the heirs to the large fortune of his uncle Nicholas Wadham and helped to put into effect his plans for the founding of Wadham College. Sir John Wyndham also erected similar brasses, but much smaller, in St Margaret's Church, Felbrigg, Norfolk, to his cousin Thomas Windham (d. 1599) (in the nave), from whom he inherited Felbrigg Hall, and to Thomas's sister Jane Coningsby (d. 1608) (in the chancel). The inscriptions in accomplished verse on all these monuments are believed to have been written by Wyndham himself.

=== Early origins ===
His grandfather was Sir John Wyndham (died 1573) of Felbrigg (second son of Sir Thomas Wyndham (d. 1521) by his first wife Eleanor Scrope, daughter and heiress of Richard Scrope of Upsall Castle, Yorkshire) who inherited Orchard, Somerset from his wife Elizabeth Sydenham (d. 1 January 1571), daughter and co-heiress of Sir John Sydenham of Orchard, Somerset.

==== Heraldic achievement ====
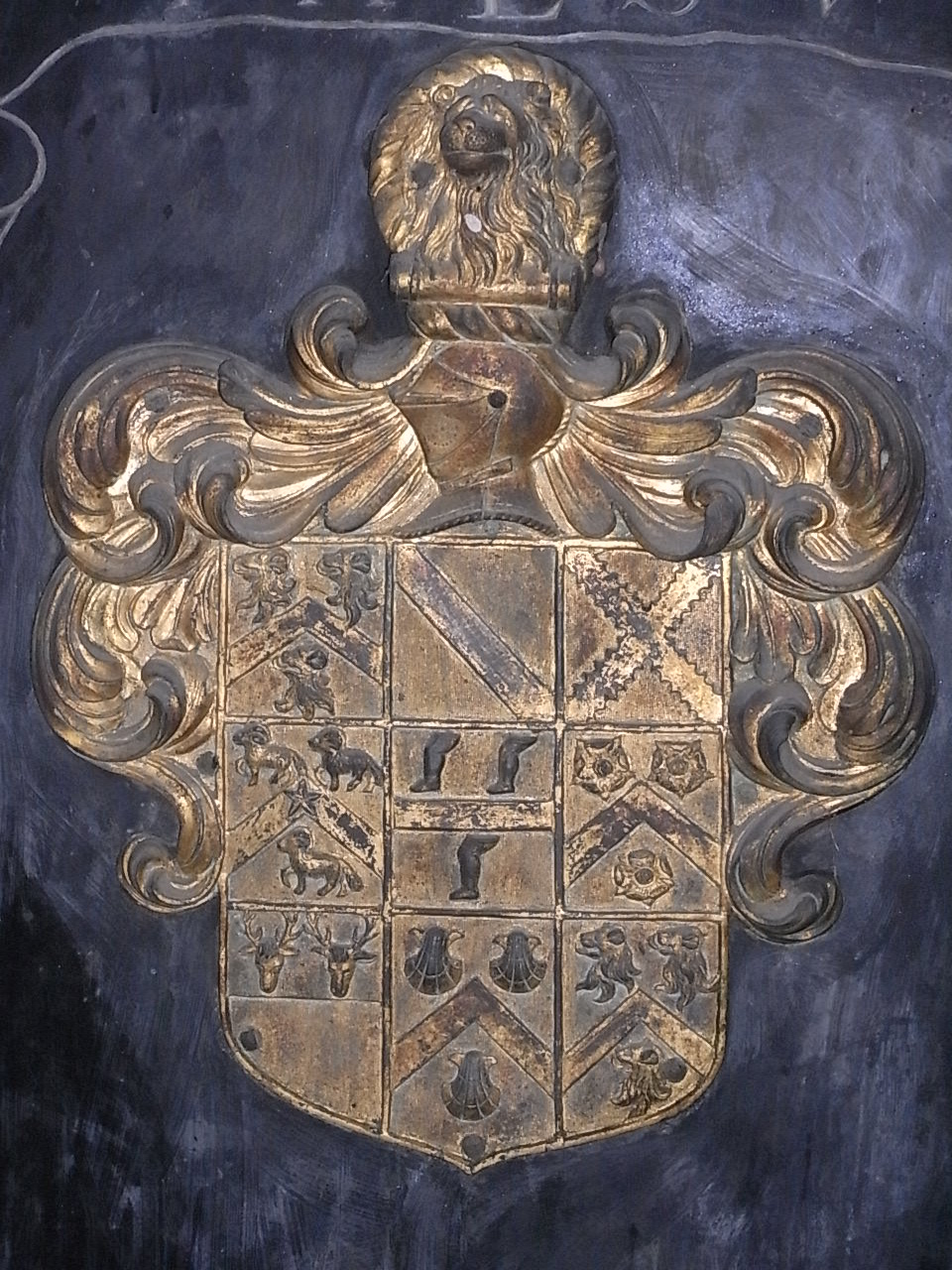
Heraldic achievement of Sir John Wyndham, Watchet Church

The ancestry of Sir John Wyndham is illustrated by the heraldic achievement shown on his monument in Watchet Church. It consists of a crest: A lion's head erased within a fetterlock or, a crest formerly belonging to the Felbrigg family of Felbrigg, Norfolk, Felbrigg Hall having been the second earliest known home of the Wyndham family (alias de Wymondham which originated at the manor of Wymondham in Norfolk), and nine quarters as follows:

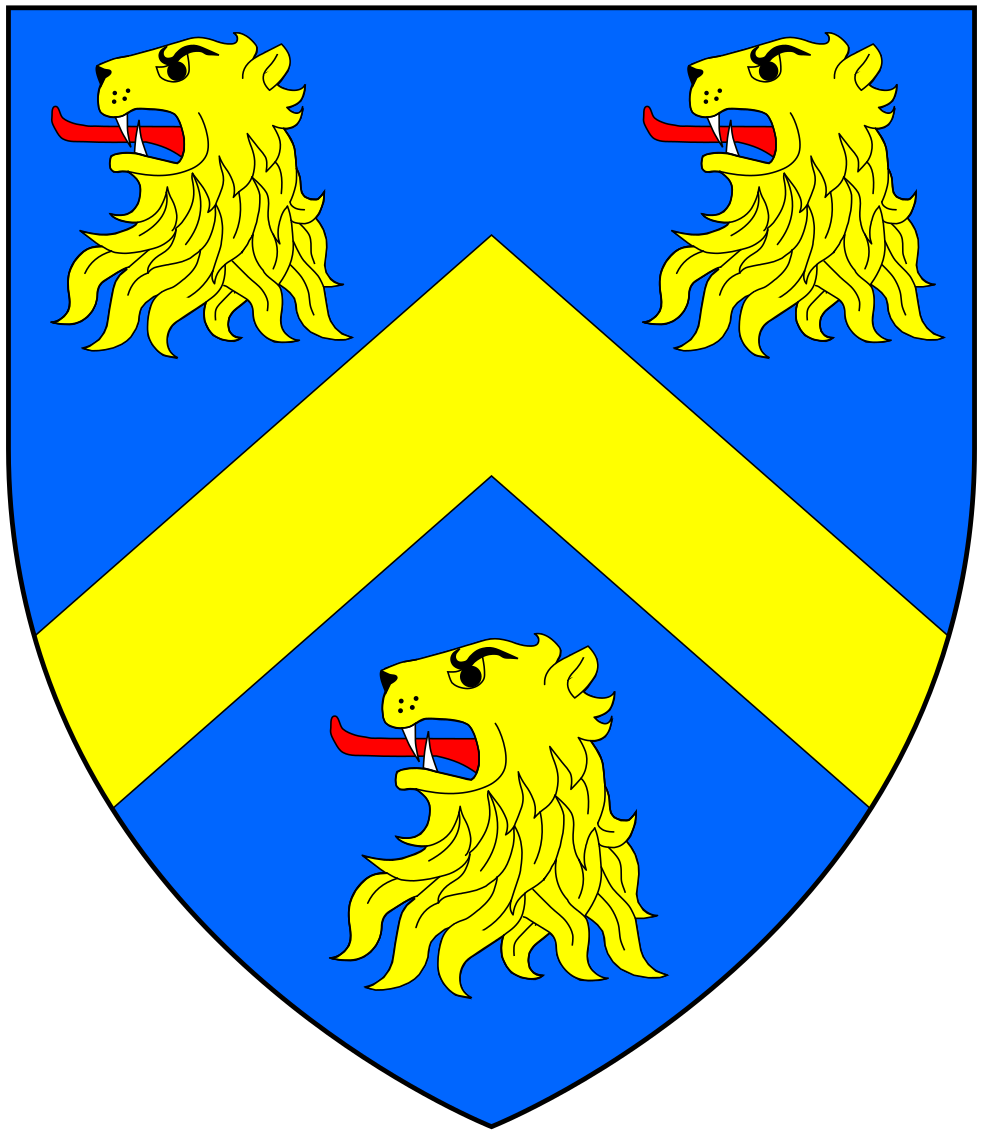
- 1st & 9th: Azure, a chevron between 3 lion's heads erased or (Wyndham);
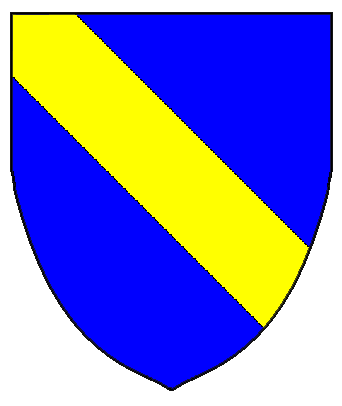
- 2nd: Azure, a bend or (Scrope), the paternal arms of his great-grandmother Eleanor Scrope (d. circa 1505), daughter of Sir Richard Scrope (1442–1485) of Upsall Castle, Yorks;
- 3rd: Argent, a saltire engrailled gules (Tiptoft), the paternal arms of Margaret Tiptoft (d. 1402 or 1431), wife of Roger Scrope, 2nd Baron Scrope of Bolton (1348–1403) (from whom Eleanor Scrope (d. 1505) was 4th in descent) and co-heiress of her father Robert de Tibetot, 3rd Baron Tibetot (d. 1372) of Nettlestead, Suffolk;
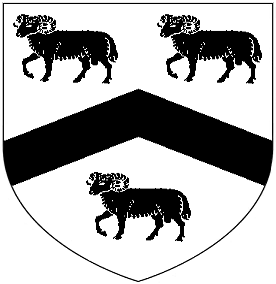
- 4th: Argent, a chevron between 3 rams passant sable a mullet for difference (Sydenham of Orchard Sydenham, later Orchard Wyndham);
- 5th: Argent, a fess between three men's legs couped sable, canting arms of Gambon of Moorstone in the parish of Halberton, Devon. Moorstone was an estate listed in the Domesday Book (1086) and in 1406 the Gambons were licensed by the Bishop of Exeter to have a private chapel in "their mansion of Morston". Substantial remains of the mediaeval manor house survive. Tempore Edward IV (1461–1483) Elizabeth Gambon the heiress of Moorstone, married John Sydenham of Orchard, which eventually brought the estate to the Wyndhams, who still owned it c.1630.
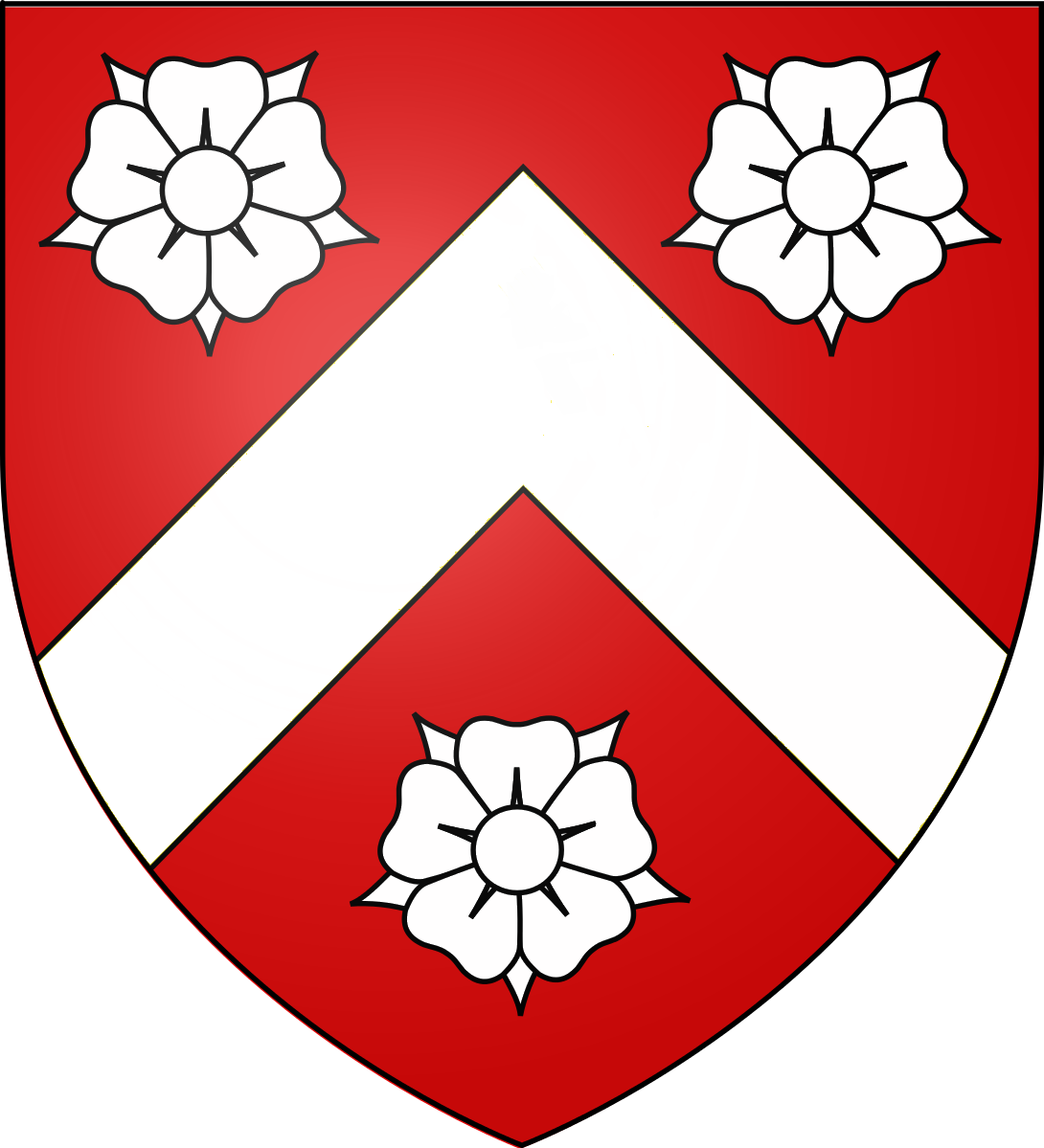
- 6th: Gules, a chevron between 3 roses argent (Wadham);
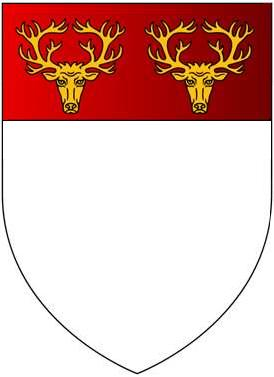
- 7th: Argent, on a chief gules two stag's heads cabosed or (Popham of Huntworth, North Petherton, Somerset, from which family the Wadhams inherited Ilton in Somerset where they built their seat of Merryfield.
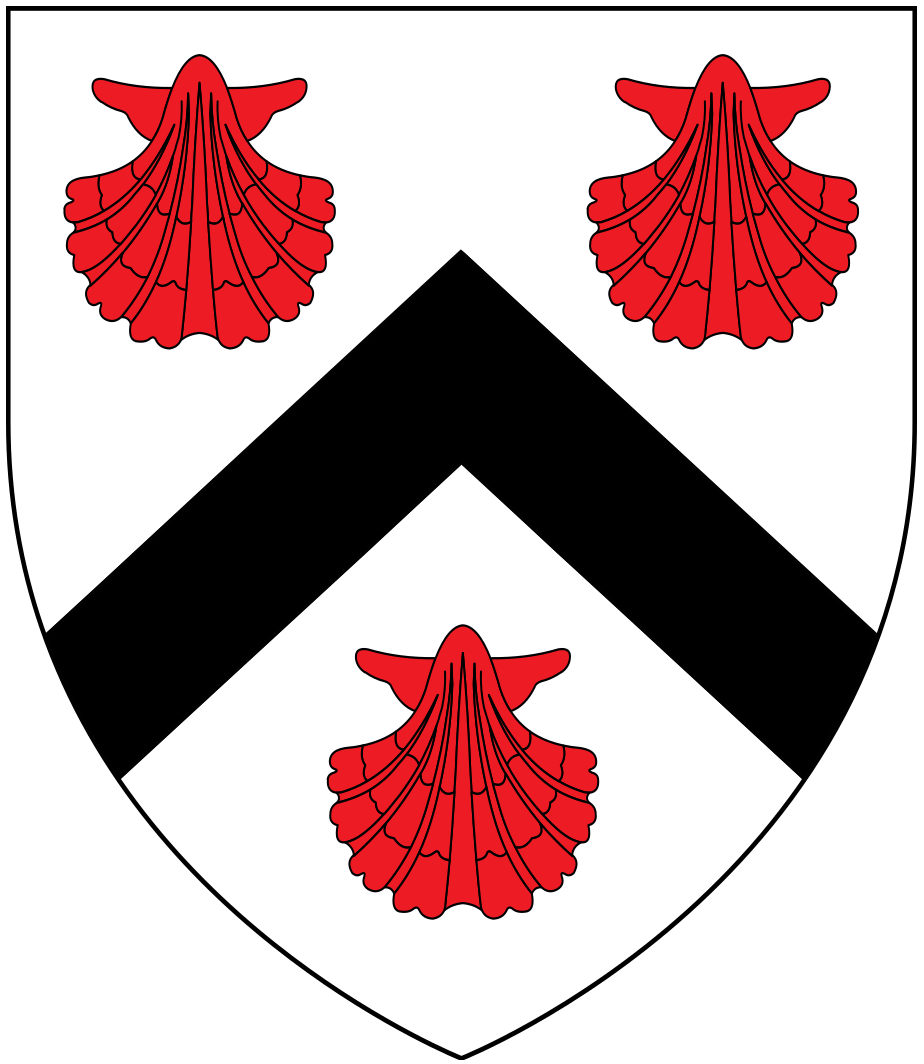
- 8th: Argent, a chevron sable between three escallops gules (Pollard of King's Nympton, Devon.

== Birth and childhood ==
Sir John Wyndham is the ancestor of every living member of the widespread Wyndham family (except perhaps for one branch in the United States) and therefore had he not been born the dynasty would have failed. However, he was born following a near-miraculous rising from the dead by his mother. The famous story is that one year after her marriage and already pregnant, Florence Wyndham became ill, was thought to have died and was left that evening in a coffin in the Wyndham Chapel in St Decuman's Church, about half a mile east of her husband's home at Kentsford Manor House, and two miles north of her father-in-law's home at Orchard Wyndham, awaiting a funeral the following day.

That night a "covetous sexton" crept into the church and in attempting to remove a valuable ring, cut the lady's finger, thereby awakening her from a cataleptic trance. "The sexton fled, leaving his lantern behind him, and with its aid she made her way home to her astounded family" at Kentsford. The story was composed in verse as "Lady Wyndham's Return", by Rev. Lewis H. Court, Vicar of St Decuman's. (See full text on Wikisource s:Lady Wyndham's Return). Soon after she gave birth to Sir John, who would be her only child. He was a minor aged twelve at the death of his father and as a tenant-in-chief his wardship and marriage reverted to the crown, Queen Elizabeth I, to be granted to whom she pleased. His grandfather, however, was able to buy-back his wardship, which prevented a forced marriage.

=== Home defence against Spain ===
He played an important role in the defence organisation of Somerset, the substantial growth of which is shown by the muster in 1580 being 12,000 able footmen, double the total twenty years earlier. The special census of horses taken on 26 August 1583 shows that their number had also increased to forty-seven great horses and 308 light horses. While the defeat of the Spanish Armada saved England from the feared invasion, the significance and value of the defence movement was in keying up the nation and teaching it to realise the heritage it had to defend.

=== Justice of the Peace ===
He served as one of the County Justices and as such shared effective responsibility for local government and administration, acting as the representative and general agent of the central government, as well as sitting in quarter sessions.

=== Civil War ===
At the start of the Civil War his sympathies appear to have been with the Parliament, which is borne out by a foray made by his cousin Sir Francis Wyndham, 1st Baronet (d. 1676), governor of Dunster Castle, in June 1644 against Orchard Wyndham, as the manor is now known, which resulted in £4,000 worth of plunder being seized for the Royalist cause. Three months after this event he gave £4,000 each for safe keeping to his eighth and ninth sons, Sir Hugh Wyndham and Sir Wadham Wyndham.

=== Oversees founding of Wadham College ===
Although Dorothy Wadham was largely responsible for overseeing the foundation and building of Wadham College, Oxford a nephew, possibly Sir John Wyndham, is recorded as attending on his dying uncle Nicholas Wadham (1531/1532 – 1609). A detailed record, preserved in the College archives, was drawn up by Wyndham of a discussion held with his uncle four days before his death in 1609 as follows:

"I was sent for after dinner unto my Uncle Wadham by Mr. Bartlett there beinge present only with him my Aunte, Mr. Bartlett and Mr. Arnold. In the presence of them he told me of the greate care that he had for the erecting of a Colledge in Oxforde, as he had hearetofore often times acquainted me. that for the performance thereof, he had in Mr. Arnold's hands £4,000 with the £500 of Sr. Henry Hawley's, and in Mr. Bartlett's hands which would shortly made up £2,000 which as he thought would be sufficient to procure above £300 p ann; that he had £400 the yeare in Essex, which he left unto my Aunte his wife duringe her life, yet hoped that out of her benevolence consideringe howe well he had dealt with her, that she would imparte a portion of it unto his Colledge during her life. That his desire was to conferre it upon Gloster hall if St Johns Colledge and the Principal might reasonably be compounded withall, otherwise he did appointe it unto Jhesus Colledge. That for the buildinge of a Chappell with buttery sellar and kitchinge he appointed £2,000, whereof (as I understood him) one £1,000 was in his Studye, and the other £1,000 was to be made out of Hewnebeare. That also (as I understood him) he appointed the moitie of the Parsonage of Abbotsbury unto the Colledge. That he must entreat me for the bestowinge of my Travayle and pains for the seinge of all things performed accordinge unto his Intention, as he had often heretofore discoursed with me about it for he did trust me only with it and reposed himself absolutely uppon me, and meant not that it shoulde be any wayes chargeable unto me, for I should have my charges absolutely defrayed in a liberall and a worthie manner to the uttermost"...

== Felbrigg inheritance ==
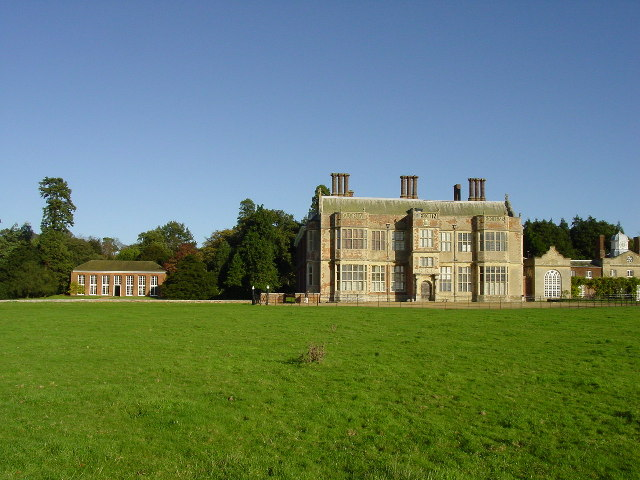
Felbrigg Hall, viewed from the south, as rebuilt circa 1620-24 by Sir John Wyndham for his 3rd son Thomas

In 1599 he succeeded to the Felbrigg estate in Norfolk, including Felbrigg Hall, from his father's first cousin Thomas Wyndham (d. 1599), who like his two brothers Sir Roger and Francis (d. 1592), Judge of Common Pleas (whose monument exists in St Peter Mancroft in Norwich) died without issue. Felbrigg was the seat of the senior line of the Wyndham family. In gratitude he placed a monumental brass inlaid in Purbeck marble, in Felbrigg Church. Sir Edmund Wyndham (d. 1568) was the eldest son of Sir Thomas Wyndham (eldest son of Sir John Wyndham (beheaded 1503 on Tower Hill with James Tyrrell) by his first wife Lady Margaret Howard, 4th daughter of John Howard, 1st Duke of Norfolk (d. 1485)) by his first wife Alianore Scrope, daughter and heiress of Richard Scrope of Upsall, Yorks. Sir John also placed a monumental brass inlaid in Purbeck marble in Felbrigg Church to Thomas Wyndham's sister Jane Wyndham (d. 1608). Both brasses are in the same style, but much smaller, as those Sir John erected in Watchet church to his parents and in Ilminstaer Church to his uncle Nicholas Wadham. The original accounts concerning the shipping and laying down of the Felbrigg brasses survive in the Wyndham papers at Felbrigg Hall, and although the brasses are known to have been purchased in London, the maker's name is not recorded. Sir John gave Felbrigg to his third son Thomas Wyndham (d. 1653), for whom he rebuilt the manor house, completed in 1624, which survives today. The arms of father (impaling Portman) and son (impaling Lytton) survive sculpted in stone side by side above the front door.

== Wadham inheritance ==
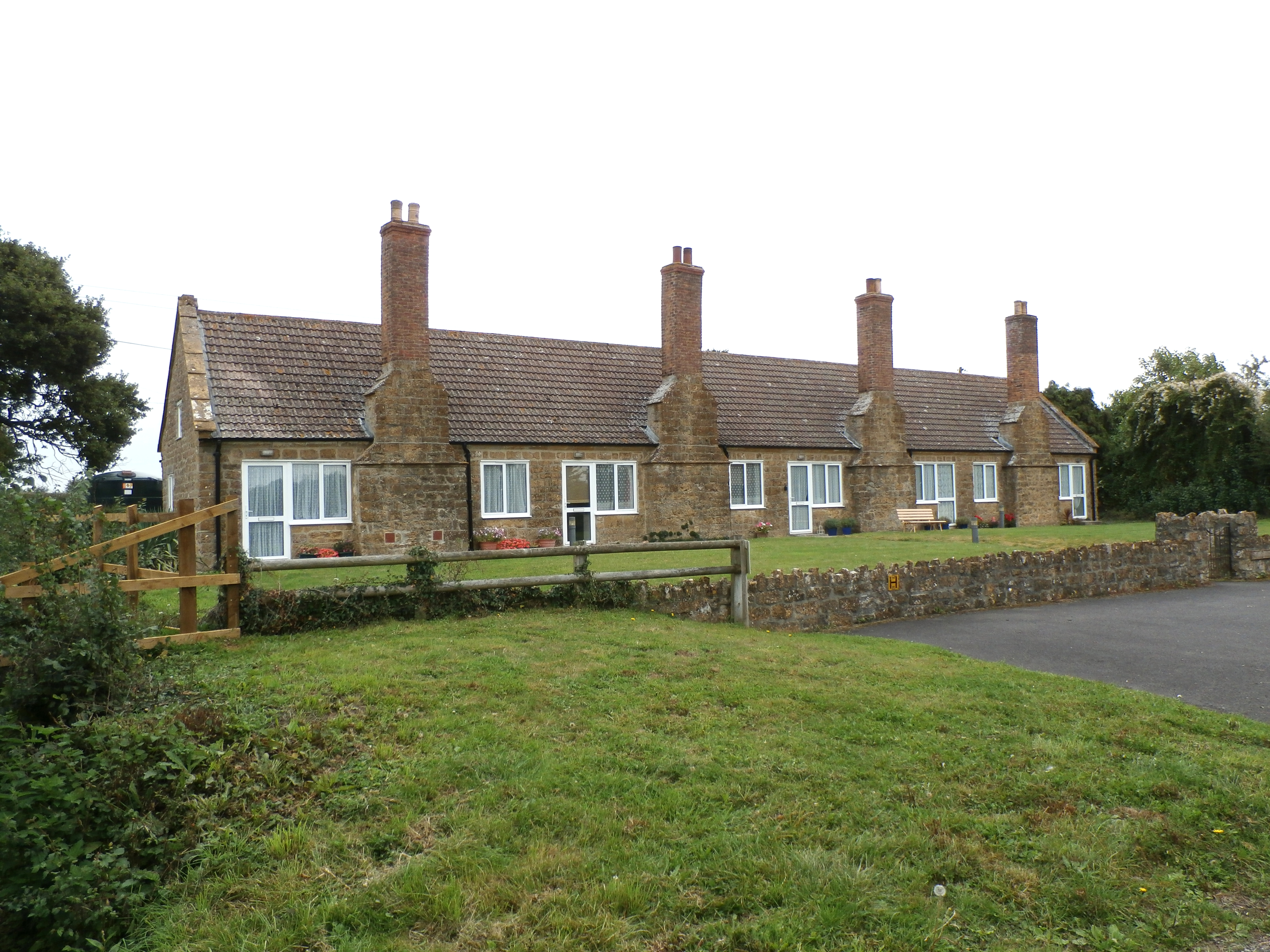
Almshouses on Merryfield Lane, Ilton, built by Sir John Wyndham (1558–1645), believed to have been made from materials from the demolished Merryfield House.

He inherited part of the lands of his uncle Nicholas Wadham, his mother having been one of his sisters and co-heiresses. Amongst the manors which fell to his share were:

- Ilton in Somerset, in which he promptly demolished the former Wadham seat of Merryfield. According to Collinson (1791):

"When John Wyndham came to the estate, disliking the situation of the house, because it was surrounded with wood, he pulled it down, and with the materials built a farm-house at a little distance, now called Woodhouse, and likewise an alms-house in the village of Ilton. There now remains no part of the ancient edifice, except an old wall on the east side. The seat was formerly moted round, and the buildings exhibited many striking indications of remote antiquity".

- Silverton in Devon, where his descendant George Wyndham, 4th Earl of Egremont (1786–1845) built "Silverton Park" (or "Egremont House"), a large neoclassical mansion, demolished in 1901. He built it to compensate himself for having been excluded from the inheritance of Petworth House in Sussex by his uncle the 3rd Earl who bequeathed it instead to his illegitimate son and adopted heir Col. George Wyndham, ancestor of the present Baron Leconfield and Egremont.
- Wadham in the parish of Knowstone in Devon, the earliest seat of the Wadham family.

== Marriage and children ==
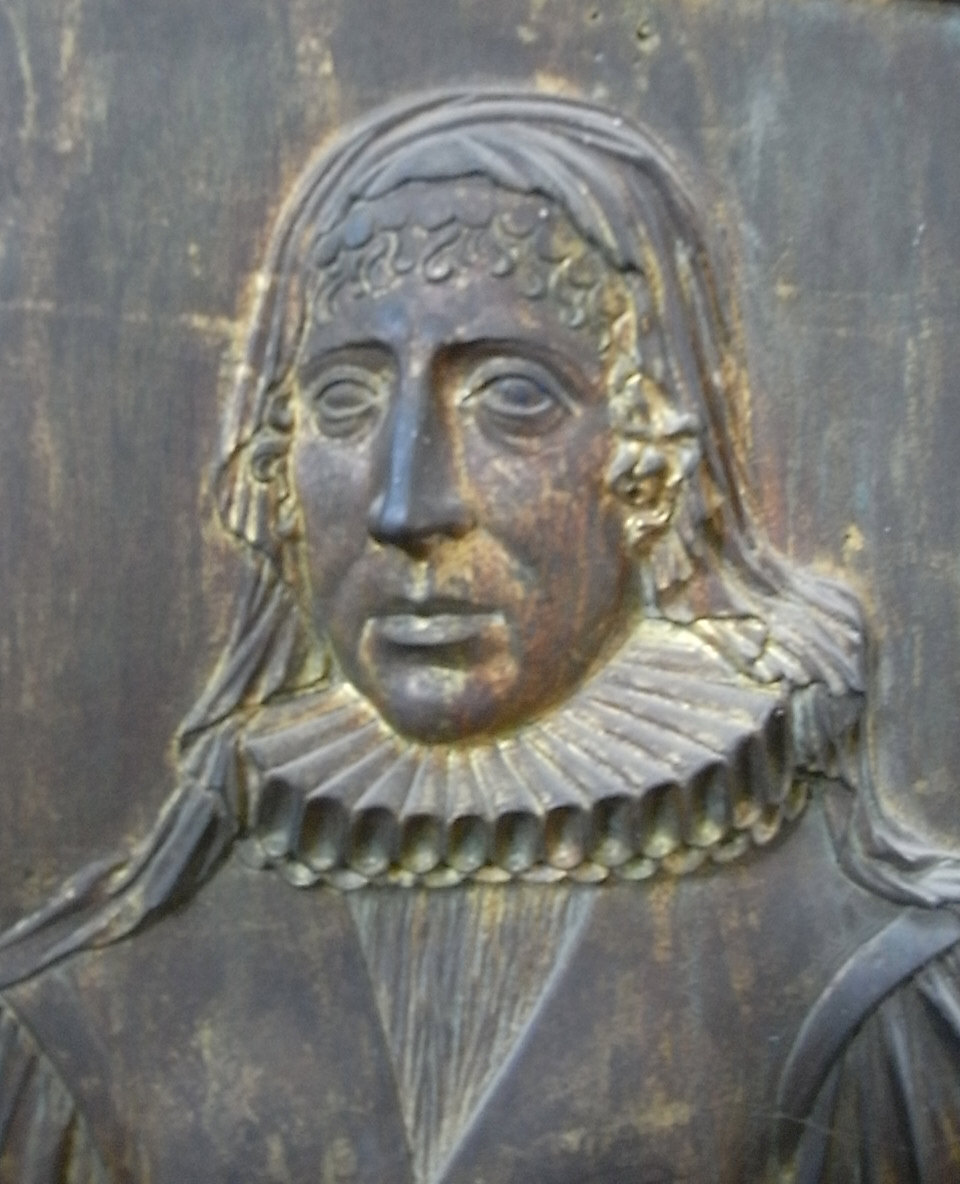
Joanna Portman (d. 13 September 1633), wife of Sir John Wyndham. Gilt-bronze cast relief plaque, on purbeck marble slab, Watchet Church

Sir John Wyndham married Joan Portman, daughter of Sir Henry Portman (d. 1590), of Orchard Portman, Somerset, son of Sir William Portman (d. 1557), Lord Chief Justice of England and Wales, by whom he had nine sons and six daughters:

=== Sons ===
- Henry Wyndham (1583–1613), eldest son, scholar in civil law, predeceased father.
- John Wyndham (d. 1649), 2nd son.
- Thomas Wyndham (d. 1653), 3rd son, to whom his father gave Felbrigg Hall and jointly with him rebuilt the ancient manor house, completed in 1624. The arms of father (impaling Portman) and son (Wyndham with cadency mark of a crescent for difference of a second son, impaling Lytton Ermine, on a chief indented azure three ducal crowns or) survive sculpted in stone side by side above the front door. He married Elizabeth Lytton.
- Humphrey, 6th (?) son.
- George Wyndham (6th son) of Uffords Manor, Cromer, Norfolk.
- George Wyndham ("senior"), (7th. son), (1592–1624), soldier.
- Hugh Wyndham (8th son), Baron of the Exchequer, > the widow of Sir Henry Berkeley, 1st Baronet of Wymondham, Leicestershire; (3) Catherine Fleming, daughter of Sir Thomas Fleming (d. 1624) of North Stoneham, Hampshire.
- Sir Wadham Wyndham (9th son), a judge of the King's Bench.

=== Daughters ===
- Joan Wyndham, married Col. John Giffard (1602–1665).
- Margaret Wyndham, married John Courtenay (d. 1660).
- Florence Wyndham (1596-1631), married John Harris (d. 1657).
- Rachel Wyndham, married Thomas Moore (d. 1695).
- Margery Wyndham, married Thomas Carew of Crowcombe Court.
- Anne Wyndham (d. 1645), married Sir John Strode (c. 1561–1642)

== Death, burial and monument ==
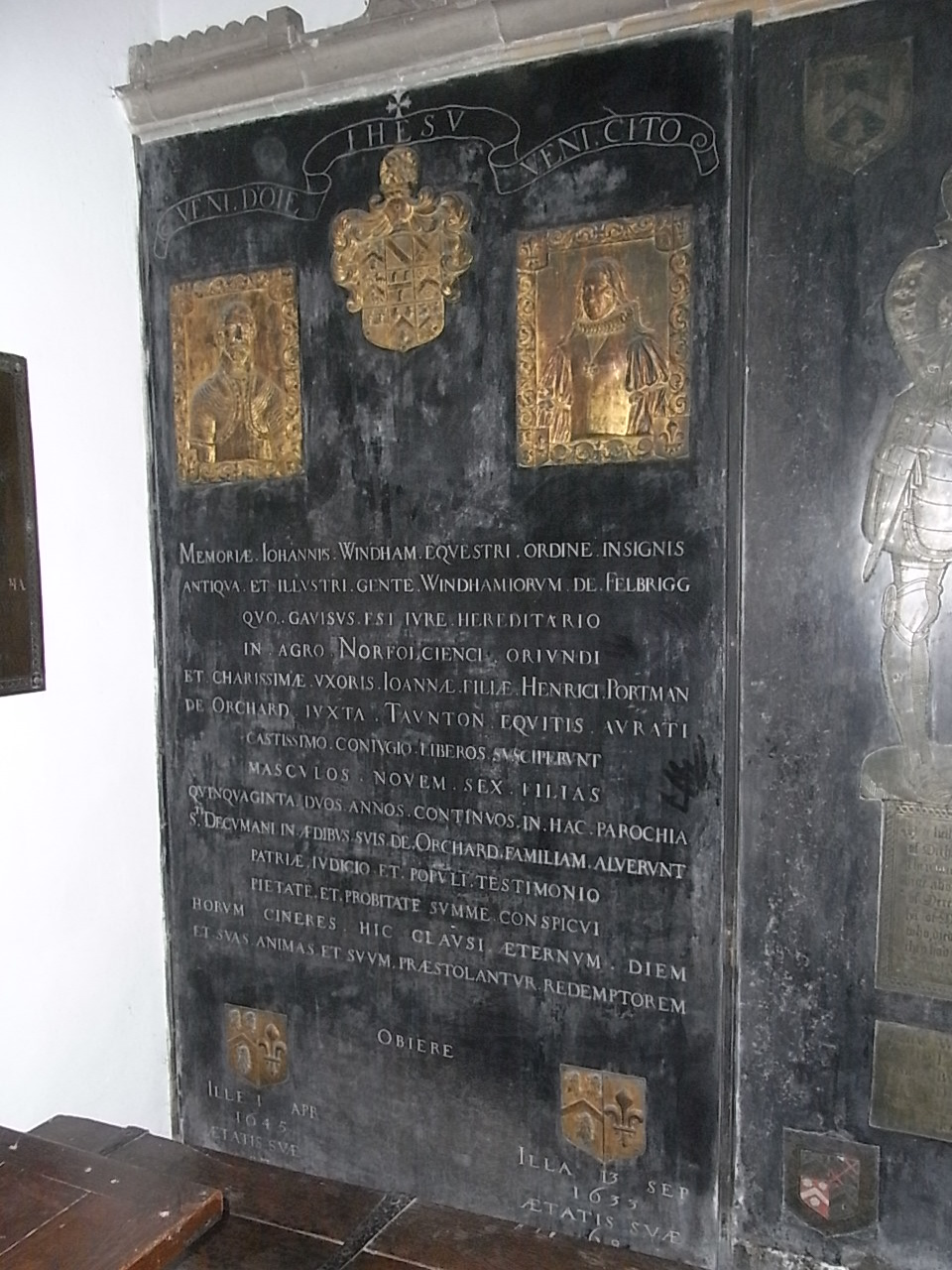
Monument to Sir John Wyndham and his wife Joan Portman, St Decuman's Church, Watchet. Immediately adjacent to the right is the monument to his father and mother

He died on 1 April 1645 and was buried in Watchet Church, Somerset, where exists a memorial to him and his wife consisting of a large slab of purbeck marble erected vertically against the east wall of the north aisle chapel, containing inlaid plaques of gilt-bronze relief-sculpted portraits and armorial shields.

== See also ==
- Wyndham baronets
- Earl of Egremont

== Sources ==
- Wyndham, Hon Hugh Archibald (later 4th Baron Leconfield), A Family History, The Wyndhams of Norfolk and Somerset, 1939.
- Wyndham, the Hon Hugh Archibald, A Family History, The Wyndhams of Somerset, Sussex and Wiltshire, 1950.
- Collinson, John, History of Somerset, Vol.3, pp. 486–496
