= Thomas Darcy, 1st Baron Darcy of Chiche =

English courtier

The Right Honourable The Lord Darcy of Chiche KG
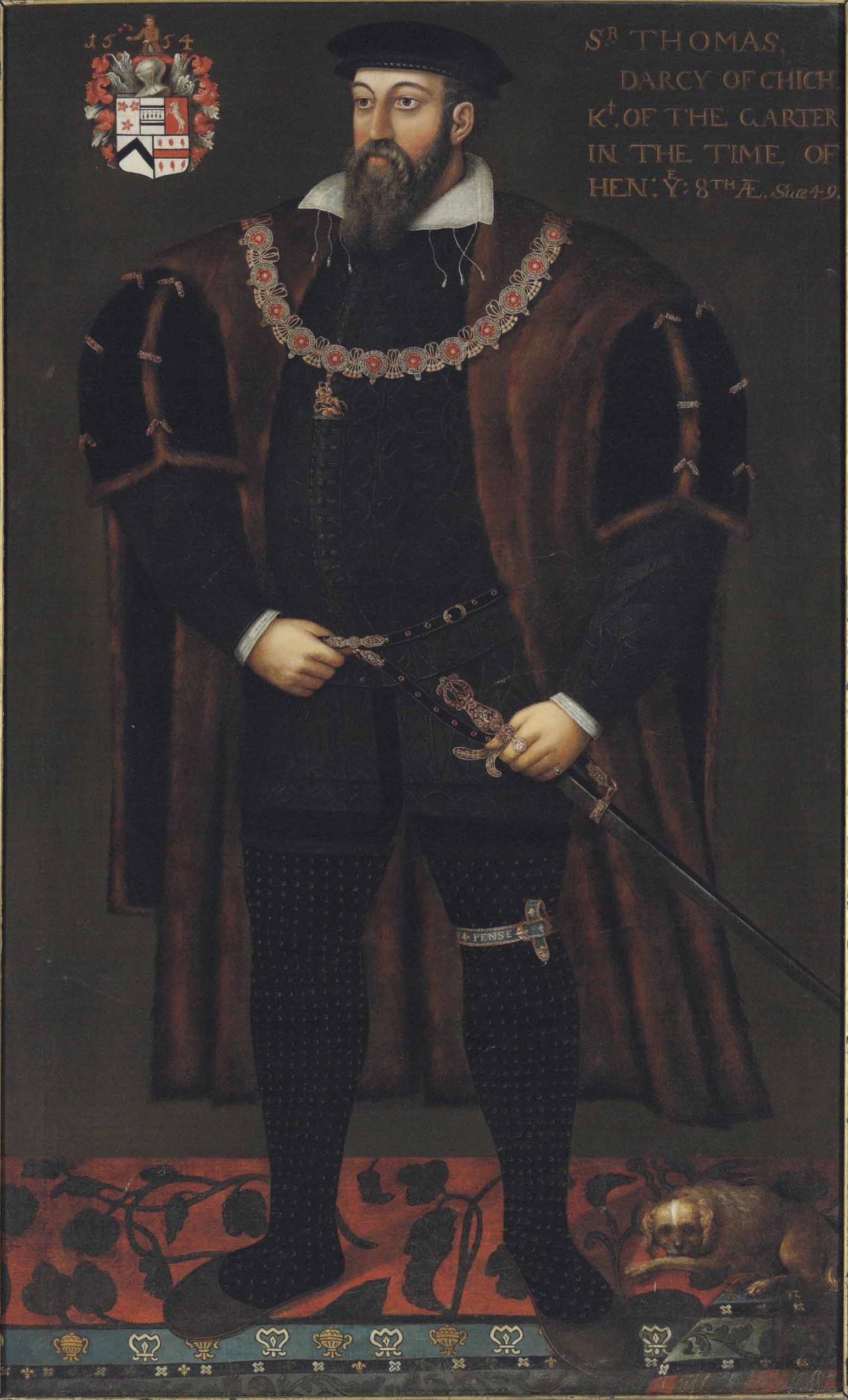
- Thomas Darcy, 1st Baron Darcy of Chiche

Lord Chamberlain
- In office 1551–1553
- Monarch: Edward VI
- Preceded by: The Lord Wentworth
- Succeeded by: Sir John Gage

Personal details
- Born: 4 December 1506
- Died: 28 June 1558 (aged 51) Wivenhoe, Essex, England
- Resting place: St Osyth, Essex, England
- Spouse: Elizabeth de Vere
- Children: John de Vere, 2nd Baron Darcy of Chiche
- Occupation: Courtier

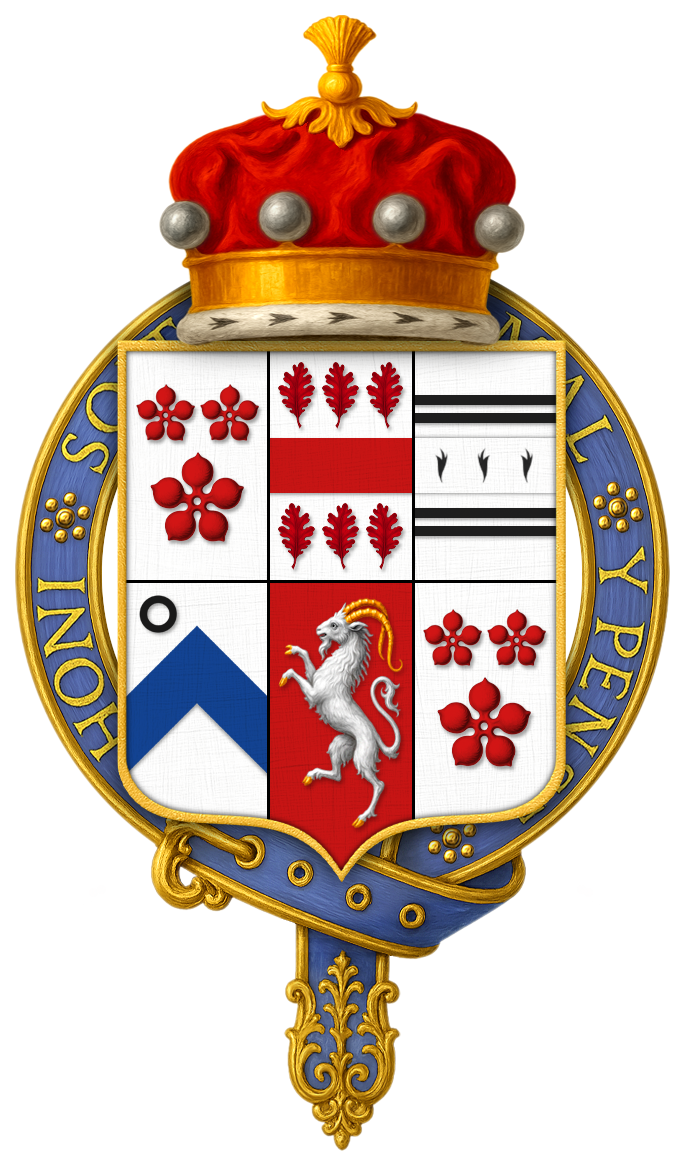
Arms of Sir Thomas Darcy, 1st Baron Darcy of Chiche, KG

Thomas Darcy, 1st Baron Darcy of Chiche (4 December 1506 – 28 June 1558) was an English courtier during the reign of Edward VI. He served as Vice-Chamberlain of the Household and Captain of the Yeomen of the Guard between 1550 and 1551 before his appointment as Lord Chamberlain of the Household. He was placed under house arrest for his support of Lady Jane Grey as Edward's successor.

== Early and family life ==
Thomas Darcy, born in 1506, was the only son and heir of Roger Darcy (d. 30 September 1508) by Elizabeth Wentworth, the daughter of Sir Henry Wentworth, and aunt of Queen Jane Seymour.

After the death of Roger Darcy, Elizabeth (née Wentworth) married secondly, as his second wife, Sir Thomas Wyndham (d. 1522) of Felbrigg, Norfolk, by whom she was the mother of Vice-Admiral Thomas Wyndham. She married thirdly, as his third wife, John Bourchier, 1st Earl of Bath.

Through his mother he was the first cousin not only of Henry VIII's Queen for a short time, and the mother of his heir, and her siblings, but of also Thomas Wentworth, 1st Baron Wentworth.

After his father's death, Thomas Darcy became the ward of Sir John Raynsford. He married Raynsford's daughter Audrey in 1521. She died childless in 1527 and he later married Elizabeth, daughter of John de Vere, 15th Earl of Oxford and Elizabeth Trussell. They had five or eight children, including John, who succeeded as 2nd Baron Darcy of Chiche. He married Frances, daughter of Richard Rich, 1st Baron Rich, and they had issue, including Thomas, 3rd Baron and 1st Earl Rivers.

== Political career ==
He was knighted by Henry VIII at Calais in November 1532. Darcy sat in parliament for Essex in 1539, 1545 and 1547, and possibly in 1536.

Following the death of the Earl of Oxford in 1540, he held offices usually held by the de Veres: Steward of St. Osyth's, Keeper of Colchester Castle and Keeper of Tendring Hundred. His position in court was assisted though his relations with the de Veres and his cousin, Edward Seymour, 1st Duke of Somerset.

Darcy was appointed to attend Anne of Cleves in 1539. He was appointed a Carver of the King's Table in 1540, a Gentleman of the Privy Chamber by 1544, and a Principal Gentleman of the Privy Chamber in 1549. He was sworn of the Privy Council on 24 January 1550, and on 2 February he was appointed Vice-Chamberlain of the Household and Captain of the Yeomen of the Guard.

On 5 April 1551, he was created Baron Darcy of Chiche to serve as Lord Chamberlain of the Household, and in this role, he led a commission to reform the revenue courts. He was elected to the Order of the Garter on 6 October.

Following the attainder and execution for treason of Sir Nicholas Carew in 1539, Darcy was granted the principal Carew estate at Beddington, which he later sold back to Carew's heirs.

He was one of the signatories to the letters patent enabling Lady Jane Grey to succeed Edward VI, and this support led to his house arrest by Mary I. He was pardoned, but lost his offices and council membership.

He died on 28 June 1558 at Wivenhoe in Essex and was buried at St Osyth's Priory. He was succeeded by his eldest son John as 2nd Baron Darcy of Chiche.

== Notes ==
Political offices
Preceded by Sir Anthony Wingfield	Vice-Chamberlain of the Household; 1550–1551	Succeeded by Sir John Gates
Preceded by Sir Anthony Wingfield	Captain of the Yeomen of the Guard; 1550–1551	Succeeded by Sir John Gates
Preceded by The Lord Wentworth	Lord Chamberlain; 1551–1553	Succeeded by Sir John Gage
Peerage of England
New creation	Baron Darcy of Chiche; 1551–1558	Succeeded by John Darcy
