= Thomas Wyndham of Felbrigg =

Sir Thomas Wyndham of Felbrigg (c.1466 – c.1522) was an English sea captain and Vice-Admiral of England.

He was born in Bolton, Yorkshire, the son of Sir John Wyndham and Margaret, daughter of Sir John Howard, 1st Duke of Norfolk.

== Career ==
He became a counsellor to King Henry VIII, who in 1512 appointed him Captain. His cousin Admiral Edward Howard. When war broke out in May 1512 Wyndham took part under Howard in the seaborne raid at Crozon on the Brittany Coast and was afterwards knighted by Howard. He accompanied King Henry as a Knight of the Body at the sieges of Thérouanne and Tournay later in the year.

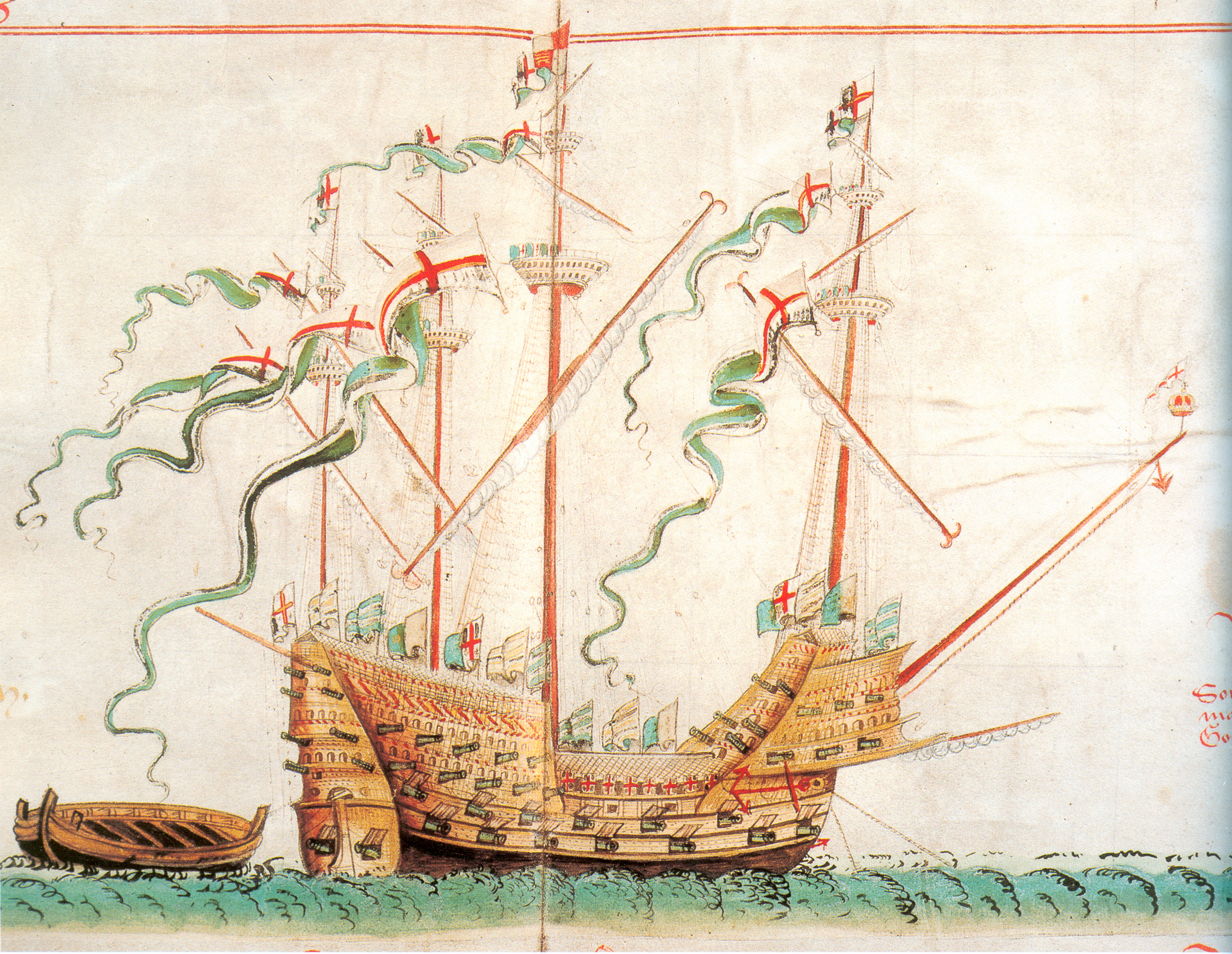
Henry Grace à Dieu

He was next made captain of the John Baptist in 1513 and Fleet Treasurer. He was promoted Vice-Admiral of England the same year and the following year made captain of the Henry Grace à Dieu.

== Private life ==
He married twice. Firstly Eleanor, daughter of Sir Richard Le Scrope. Eleanor Wyndham was appointed to wait on Catherine of Aragon in October 1501. They had several sons and daughters, including Sir John Wyndham of Orchard Wyndham. Secondly, he married Elizabeth Wentworth, the daughter of Sir Henry Wentworth, and aunt of Queen Jane Seymour. Elizabeth was the widow of Roger Darcy (d. 30 September 1508) and the mother of Thomas Darcy, 1st Baron Darcy of Chiche (1506–1558). After his death Elizabeth remarried, as his third wife, John Bourchier, 1st Earl of Bath.

With Elizabeth, Thomas Wyndham had several more children, including Vice-Admiral Sir Thomas Wyndham.

They lived at Felbrigg Hall in Norfolk. He was laid to rest in the Lady Chapel at Norwich Cathedral, but later moved to the Jesus Chapel.
