= Wyndham baronets =

Extinct baronetcy in the Baronetage of England

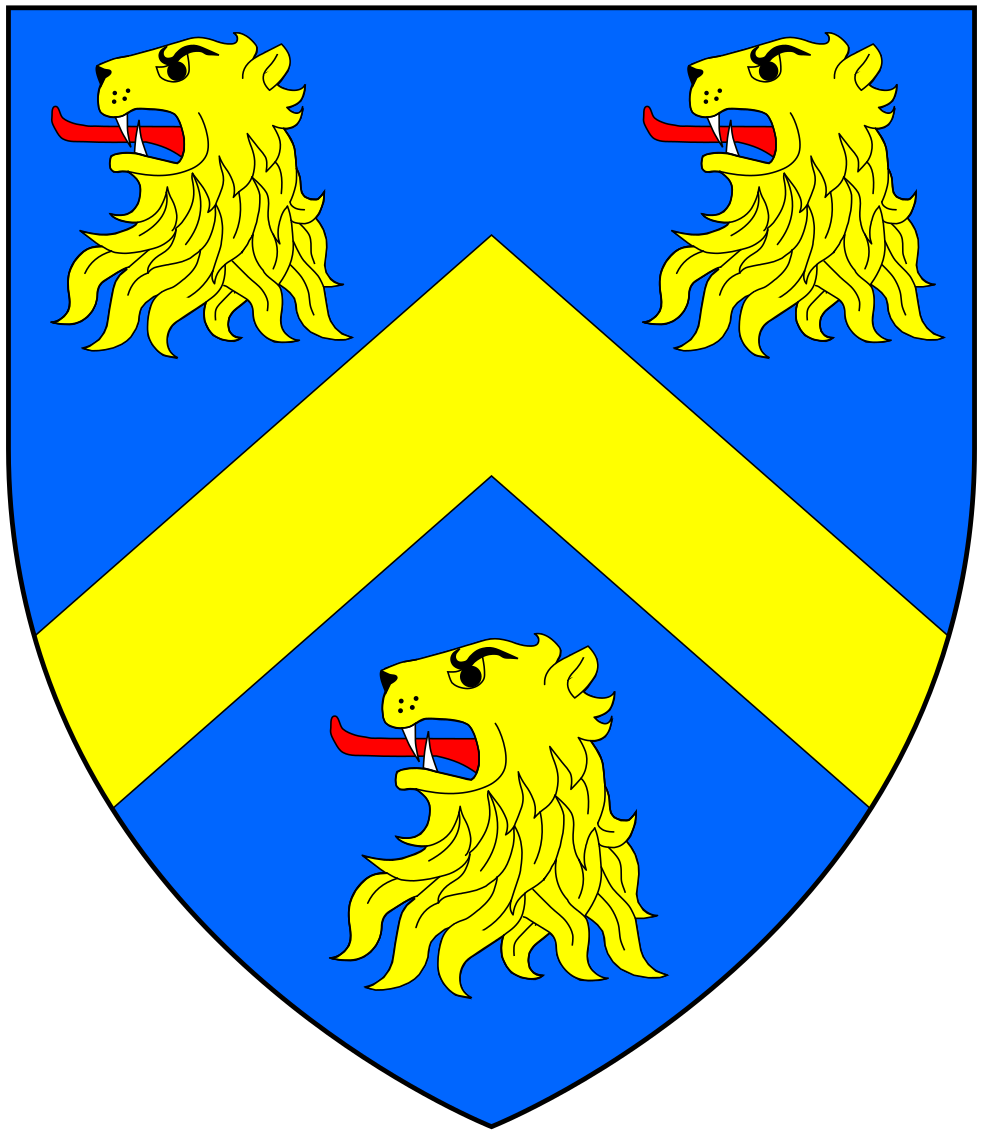
Arms of Wyndham: Azure, a chevron between three lion's heads erased or

There have been three Wyndham Baronetcies, all created in the Baronetage of England. All were created for descendants of Sir John Wyndham (d.1573) of Orchard Wyndham in the parish of Watchet, Somerset, by his wife Elizabeth Sydenham, daughter and co-heiress of Sir John Sydenham of Orchard Sydenham (later renamed Orchard Wyndham). He was a grandson of Sir John Wyndham (executed Tower Hill 1502/3) of Felbrigg, Norfolk, by his first wife Lady Margaret Howard, the fourth daughter of John Howard, 1st Duke of Norfolk.

== Wyndham baronets, of Pilsden Court, Dorset (1641) ==
- Sir Hugh Wyndham, 1st Baronet (died 1663). Second son of Edmund Wyndham (died 1616), of Kentsford in the parish of Watchet, Somerset (whose monumental brass survives in St Decuman's Church, Watchet), 2nd son of Sir John Wyndham (d.1573) of Orchard Wyndham in the parish of Watchet, by his wife Elizabeth Sydenham, daughter and co-heiress of Sir John Sydenham of Orchard Sydenham (later renamed Orchard Wyndham).

== Wyndham baronets, of Orchard Wyndham (1661) ==
see Earl of Egremont

== Wyndham baronets, of Trent, Somerset (1673) ==
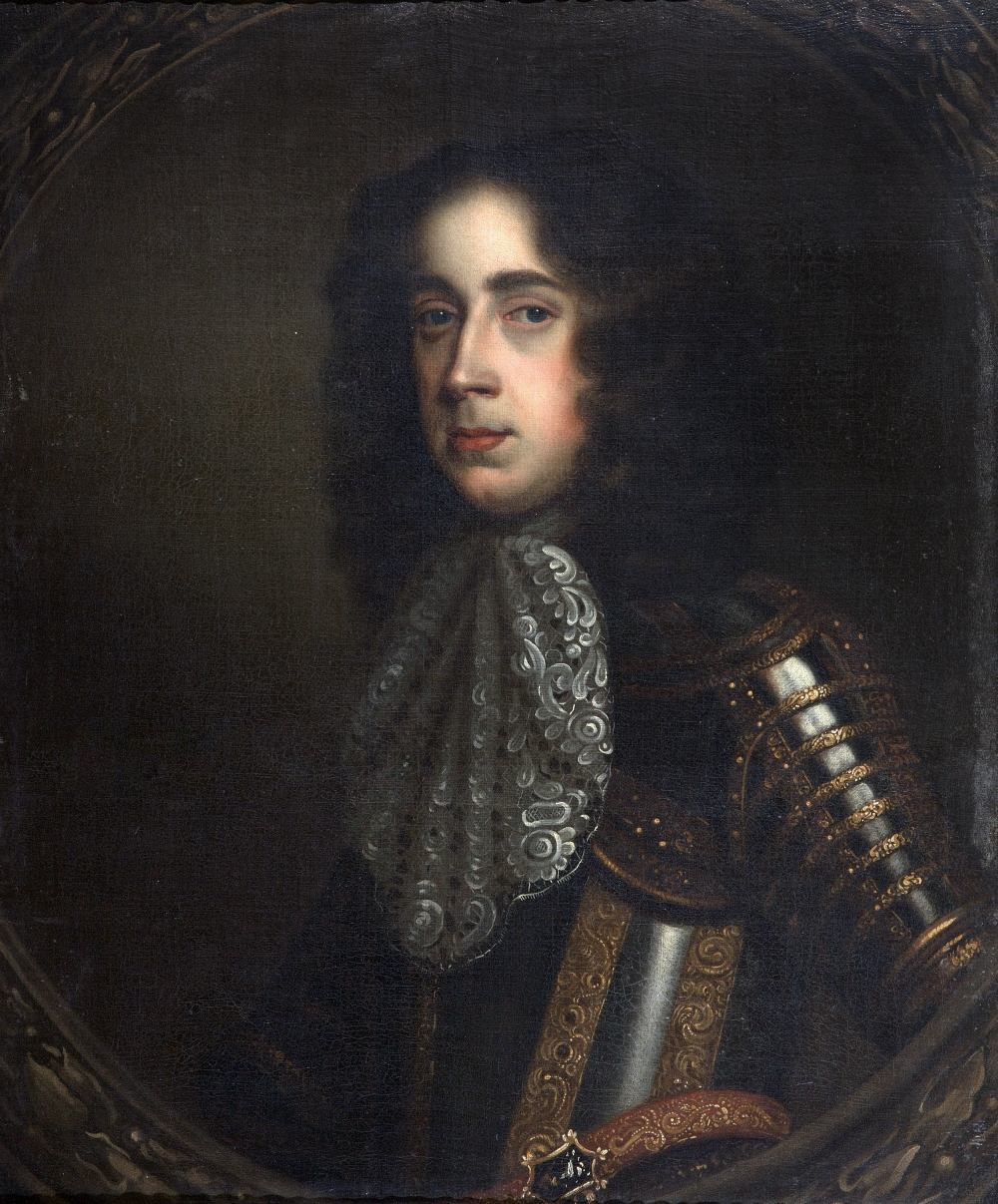
Sir Francis Wyndham, 3rd Baronet (c.1654-1716) of Trent. Portrait c.1690 by unknown artist, Somerset County Museums

The manor of Trent was formerly in Somerset, now in Dorset.

- Sir Francis Wyndham, 1st Baronet (c. 1612 – 15 July 1676). 5th son of Sir Thomas Wyndham of Kentsford, Watchet, Somerset (elder brother of Sir Hugh Wyndham, 1st Baronet (died 1663) of Pilsden) by his wife Elizabeth Coningsby, daughter of Richard Coningsby, MP for Minehead, Somerset (1640) and twice for Milborne Port, Somerset (1660, 1661–76). He married Anne Gerard, a daughter and co-heiress of Thomas Gerard of Trent in Somerset (now Dorset). He sheltered King Charles II at Trent for several weeks following the Royalist defeat at the Battle of Worcester in 1651.
- Sir Thomas Wyndham, 2nd Baronet (c. 1648 – 1693), 2nd son, MP for Ilchester.
- Sir Francis Wyndham, 3rd Baronet (c. 1654 – 22 March 1716)
- Sir Francis Wyndham, 4th Baronet (c. 1707 – 16 April 1719)
