= Thomas Wyndham (Royal Navy officer) =

English naval officer and navigator (1508–1554)

Vice-Admiral Thomas Wyndham
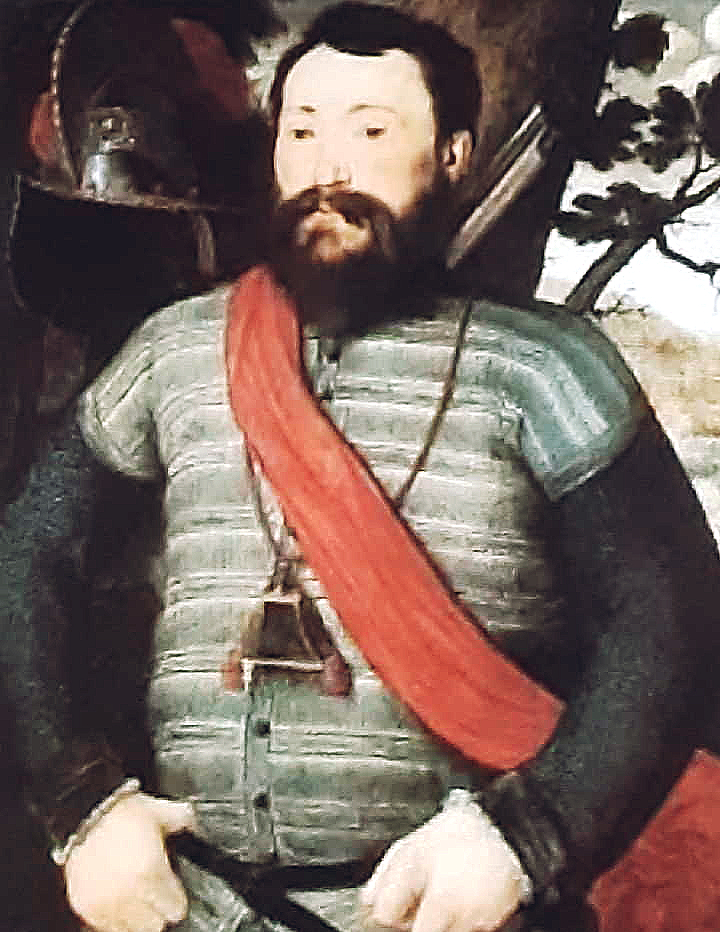
- Portrait of Thomas Wyndham by Hans Eworth, 1550
- Born: c. 1510; Felbrigg, Norfolk, Kingdom of England
- Died: 1554 (aged 43–44) at sea, off of the Kingdom of Benin, Africa
- Burial place: At sea off the coast of Benin
- Military career
- Allegiance: England
- Branch: Royal Navy
- Service years: 1532–1554
- Rank: Vice-Admiral
- Commands: Master of Naval Ordnance

Vice-Admiral Thomas Wyndham (or Windham; 1508–1554) was an English naval officer, naval administrator, explorer, and navigator. He was appointed a member of the Council of the Marine as one of the Chief Officers of the Admiralty in 1552 and given the title of Master of Naval Ordnance and was simultaneously a member of the Board of Ordnance until 1553.

== Family and early life ==
He was born around 1510, the son of Sir Thomas Wyndham of Felbrigg and his wife Elizabeth, the daughter of Sir Henry Wentworth and the aunt of Queen Jane Seymour. From his mother Elizabeth Wentworth's first marriage to Roger Darcy (d. 30 September 1508), Thomas Wyndham was the half-brother of Thomas Darcy, 1st Baron Darcy of Chiche. Through her he was also a first cousin of Thomas Wentworth, 1st Baron Wentworth. By his father's first marriage to Alianore Scrope, he was the half-brother of Sir John Wyndham of Orchard Wyndham. Both of his father's marriages produced numerous children. His mother married, thirdly, as his third wife, John Bourchier, 1st Earl of Bath.

His grandfather, Sir John Wyndham, was implicated in the conspiracy of Edmund de la Pole, earl of Suffolk, and executed for treason in 1502. When his father died in 1522, Wyndham was left in the general care of his father's executors, Thomas Howard, earl of Surrey, Thomas Howard, duke of Norfolk, and "my moost singuler good Lord" Cardinal Wolsey. Arrangements were made for his education at the University of Louvain and possibly in Italy. His father also left his son substantial properties "to bye a marriage for him of Inheritaunce". Wyndham later married and had one son, Henry, and two daughters.

== Career ==
From 1536 to 1540, he was employed in Ireland as a servant of Thomas Cromwell. In 1539, he was appointed captain of one hundred soldiers and experienced heavy fighting in Ireland under the leadership of James Butler, earl of Ormond. In 1540, ill health forced his return to England where he was awarded the former monastery of Chicksand, Bedfordshire.

The first known instance of his service at sea occurred in 1542 when he commanded a vessel fighting against Scotland in the North Sea. In 1545 Wyndham and William Hawkins seized the Spanish ship Santa Maria de Guadeloupe. Judged an act of piracy, they were ordered by the privy council to pay compensation. Additional allegations of piracy were made against Wyndham over the next several years.

During the Anglo-Scottish war of the Rough Wooing, Wyndham commanded a ship at the landing at Edinburgh in 1544. In December 1547 he sailed two ships to Dundee to support the English garrison at Broughty Castle commanded by Andrew Dudley. He investigated the River Tay towards Perth looking to rob church roofs to make lead bullets. On Christmas Day 1547 he burnt Balmerino Abbey, and on 29 December he burnt Elcho Nunnery. On land, in January he placed a garrison of 20 men with cannon and hand guns on the steeple of St Mary's at Dundee, with the help of Andrew Dudley and the Scottish Lord Gray. He constructed a battery at Haddington called "Wyndham's bulwark". With James Wilford on 3 June 1548, he captured Dalkeith Palace (and with it, James Douglas, the future Regent Morton), and razed the town by fire.

However, near the end of the war, the English commander, the Earl of Rutland, was required to investigate Wyndham's activities capturing foreign merchant vessels in the Firth. These disputed prizes included a coal-ship, seven Norwegian vessels laden with meal, pitch and timber, 4 French ships, a small warship he gave to his nephew, John Luttrell, another ship laden with soap and madder, and others. On 29 March 1550, the day peace was declared in England, Wyndham was sent to Scotland with two post horses and five Scottish hostages to exchange for Luttrell, who had been captured at Broughty.

Around 1550, Hans Eworth painted Wyndham's, Wilford's, and John Luttrell's portraits. Wyndham wears a powder flask at his neck and a gun over his shoulder inscribed, "TW, aetatis XLII.MDL," indicating he was 42 in 1550. In 1590, the picture was called, "Of Mr Thomas Wyndham drowned in the Sea returninge from Ginny."

"Ginny", meaning Guinea, was the name used for the western part of Africa now including Nigeria. The voyage to Guinea was backed by George Barnes of London. The planned voyage was noted by the Imperial ambassador Jean Scheyfve. In May 1553 Scheyfve thought Wyndham might employ a Portuguese pilot called Pinteado and sail in July. Thomas Wyndham's crew for this 1553 expedition included a future noteworthy explorer in his own right, Martin Frobisher. Wyndham and his crew were received in person by the Oba ('king') of Kingdom of Benin, who in turn traded with them. Wyndham died in 1554 at sea off Benin, on the return leg of his voyage. He left John Luttrell £100 in his will.

== Bibliography ==
- Andrews, Kenneth R. (1984). Trade, Plunder and Settlement Maritime Enterprise and the Genesis of the British Empire, 1480-1630. Cambridge University Press. pp. 106-7. ISBN 978-0-521-27698-6.
- Howgego, Raymond John, ed. (2003). "Wyndham, Thomas". Encyclopedia of Exploration to 1800. Hordern House. p. 1113. ISBN 1-875567-36-4.
- McDermott, James (2001). Martin Frobisher: Elizabethan Privateer. Yale University Press. pp. 34–39. ISBN 978-0-300-08380-4.
- Towns, Lydia (2019). The Opening of the Atlantic World: Enland's Transatlantic Interests During the Reign of Henry VIII (PDF) (PhD). University of Texas at Arlington.
- Rodger, N. A. M. (1998). The safeguard of the sea : a naval history of Britain, 660-1649. Internet Archive. New York : W.W. Norton. ISBN 978-0-393-31960-6.
- "Wyndham, Thomas". Oxford Dictionary of National Biography (Revised ed.). 2004.
- Historical Manuscripts Commission, 12th report, Appendix, part 4, The Manuscripts of the Duke of Rutland at Belvoir Castle, vol. 1, (1888)
