= Windham (surname) =

Windham is a surname, and may refer to:

- From de Wymondham (Windham), lords of Wymondham, later of Felbrigg Hall
  - Ailward de Wymondham (fl. 12th century), a person of some consideration in the time of Henry the First
  - William Windham (of Earsham, senior) (died 1730), Member of Parliament 1722–1730
  - William Windham (of Earsham, junior) (c. 1706–1789), his son, Member of Parliament 1766–1768
  - William Windham, Sr. (1717–1761), of Felbrigg, traveler and militia advocate
  - William Windham (1750–1810), of Felbrigg, Whig statesman
  - William Lukin Windham (1768–1833), Royal Navy officer
  - William Windham (Liberal politician) (William Howe Windham, died 1854), son of the above, Member of Parliament 1832–1835
- Barry Windham (born 1961), American professional wrestlers
- Charles Ash Windham (1810-1870), British Army officer and Conservative Party politician
- Craig Windham (1949–2016), journalist for National Public Radio
- David Windham (born 1961), American football player
- Donald Windham (1920-2010), American writer
- Kathryn Tucker Windham (1918-2011), American writer
- Kendall Windham (born 1966), American professional wrestlers
- Kevin Windham (born 1978), American motocross racer
- Kevin Windham Jr. (Born 1993), American Politician
- Ryder Windham, science fiction author
- Wendy Windham (born 1967), American actress
- Will Windham (born 1985), American football coach
- William Windham (rower) (1926–2021), British Olympic rower

== See also ==
- Wyndham (surname)
