= Hugh Wyndham (judge) =

English judge (1602–1684)

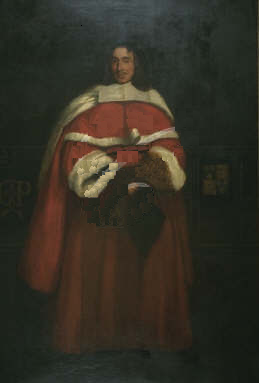
"Sir Hugh Wyndham, Kt., Judge of the Common Pleas" (1602/3-1684), painted by John Michael Wright (c.1617–1694), Guildhall Art Gallery, City of London

Sir Hugh Wyndham SL (1602 – 24 December 1684), of Silton, near Gillingham, Dorset, was an English Judge of the Common Pleas and a Baron of the Exchequer.

== Origins ==
He was born in 1602, at Orchard Wyndham, Somerset, the eighth son of Sir John Wyndham (1558–1645) of Orchard Wyndham, by his wife Joan Portman, daughter of Sir Henry Portman (d.1590) of Orchard Portman, Somerset. His younger brother was the judge Sir Wadham Wyndham (d.1668).

== Education ==
He was educated at Wadham College, Oxford: the college had been founded by his paternal grandmother's brother, Nicholas Wadham (d.1609). He was admitted to Lincoln's Inn on 19 March 1622, and was called to the bar on 16 June 1629, becoming a Bencher in 1648. On 2 January 1643 he was made MA of Oxford University by Royal Warrant.

== Career ==
=== Judicial service under Cromwell ===
In February 1654, he became a serjeant-at-law on the authority of parliament. He was appointed a judge of the court of common pleas on 30 May 1654 by Lord Protector Oliver Cromwell, and was appointed to the commission of oyer and terminer charged with dealing with the Penruddock uprising in 1655. Despite his promotion under Oliver Cromwell, he was looked upon with some suspicion by the Commonwealth, and in 1651 his home at Silton was searched by order of the Council of State, upon information that some design against the peace had lately been planned there. The search produced nothing incriminating.

=== Imprisonment at Restoration ===
He was deprived of his office on the Restoration and was at once called to account for having sat in judgment on the men of John Penruddock and was imprisoned in the Tower of London while his conduct was investigated. He declared that he had done so "only by the soliciting and earnest importunity of divers of His Majesty's party" and to save the accused if he could.

=== Pardoned by King Charles II ===
His reasons were accepted and he was pardoned and allowed to resume practice as a serjeant-at-law in June 1660, this time by royal authority. He did not however return to the bench until 20 June 1670 when he was appointed Baron of the Exchequer, eight days after which he was knighted by King Charles II. On 22 January 1673, he became a judge of the court of common pleas once more.

== Service after Great Fire ==
After the Great Fire of London in 1666, Sir Hugh Wyndham, along with his brother Sir Wadham Wyndham, served as a judge at the Fire Court set up in 1667 to hear cases relating to property destroyed in the fire. The Court sat at Clifford's Inn and focused primarily on deciding who should pay for a property to be rebuilt, and cases were heard and a verdict usually given within a day. The judges worked gratis, three to four days a week. Had it not been for the operation of the Fire Court legal wrangles might have dragged on for months, which would have delayed the rebuilding which was so necessary for London to recover. In recognition of their services the artist John Michael Wright (c. 1617–1694), was commissioned to paint portraits of all 22 judges who had sat in the Fire Court. Wyndham's portrait is held today by the Guildhall Art Gallery, in the City of London.

== Marriage and progeny ==
He married three times:

- Firstly, c.1640 to Jane Wodehouse, daughter of Sir Thomas Wodehouse, 2nd Baronet (died 1658) of Kimberley, Norfolk, and by her had two sons and three daughters. Only two daughters survived to adulthood:
  - Blanche Wyndham, who married Sir Nathaniel Napier, 2nd Baronet
  - Rachel Wyndham, who married John Digby, later third and last Earl of Bristol.
- Secondly he married Elizabeth Mynne, daughter of Sir William Mynne (or Minn) (c.1561–1618) of Woodcote Park, Epsom, Surrey, the nephew of Nicholas Mynne, and widow of Sir Henry Berkeley, 1st Baronet of Wymondham, Leicestershire. There was no issue.
- Thirdly, in 1675 he married Katherine Fleming, daughter of Thomas Fleming (d. 1639; son of Thomas Fleming) of North Stoneham, Hampshire, and widow of Sir Edward Hooper of Boveridge (or Beveridge), Dorset. They also had no issue.

== Death and burial ==
Sir Hugh Wyndham died in his eighty-second year on 27 July 1684 while on circuit at Norwich. He was buried at the church of St Nicholas, Silton, Dorset, and is commemorated by a white marble memorial, "a very fine standing figure", sculpted by Jan van Nost. His will, covering estates in Dorset and Somerset, left his lands to his two daughters.

Wyndham's Oak, an historic tree named after Wyndham, in whose shade he used to sit, stands near Silton.

== Sources ==
- Handley, Stuart. "Wyndham, Sir Hugh". Oxford Dictionary of National Biography (online ed.). Oxford University Press. doi:10.1093/ref:odnb/30143. (Subscription, Wikipedia Library access or UK public library membership required.)
- Wyndham, the Hon H A, "A Family History, The Wyndhams of Somerset, Sussex and Wiltshire", 1950.
