= Wadham Wyndham (judge) =

English judge (1609–1668)

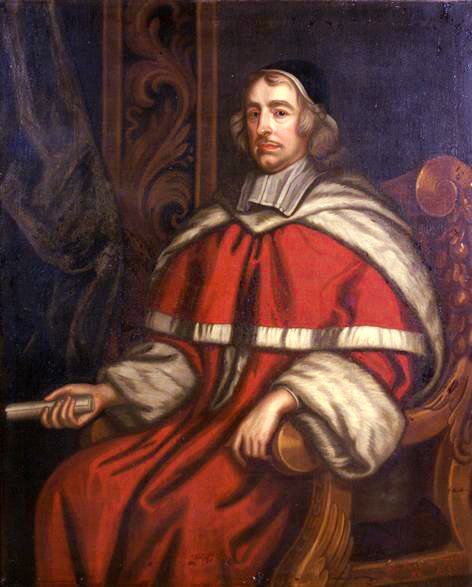
Sir Wadham Wyndham by John Michael Wright c. 1660, private collection at Orchard Wyndham, Somerset

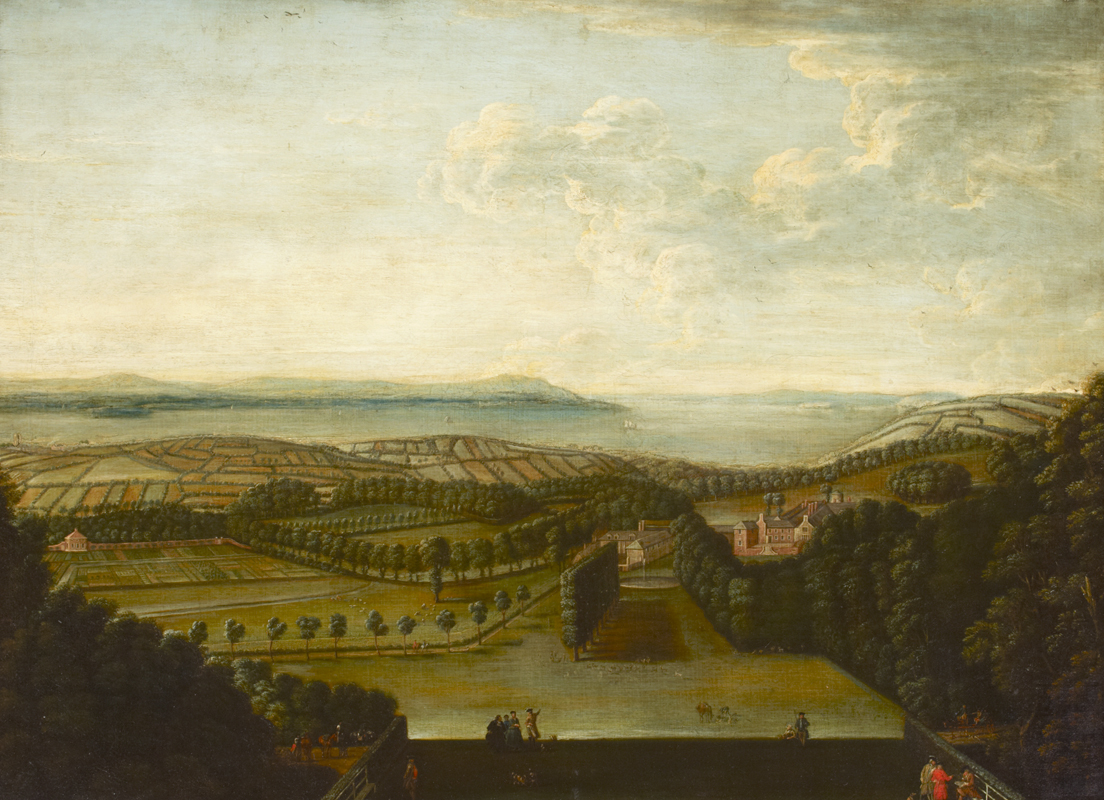
Orchard Wyndham: Sir Wadham Wyndham's birthplace

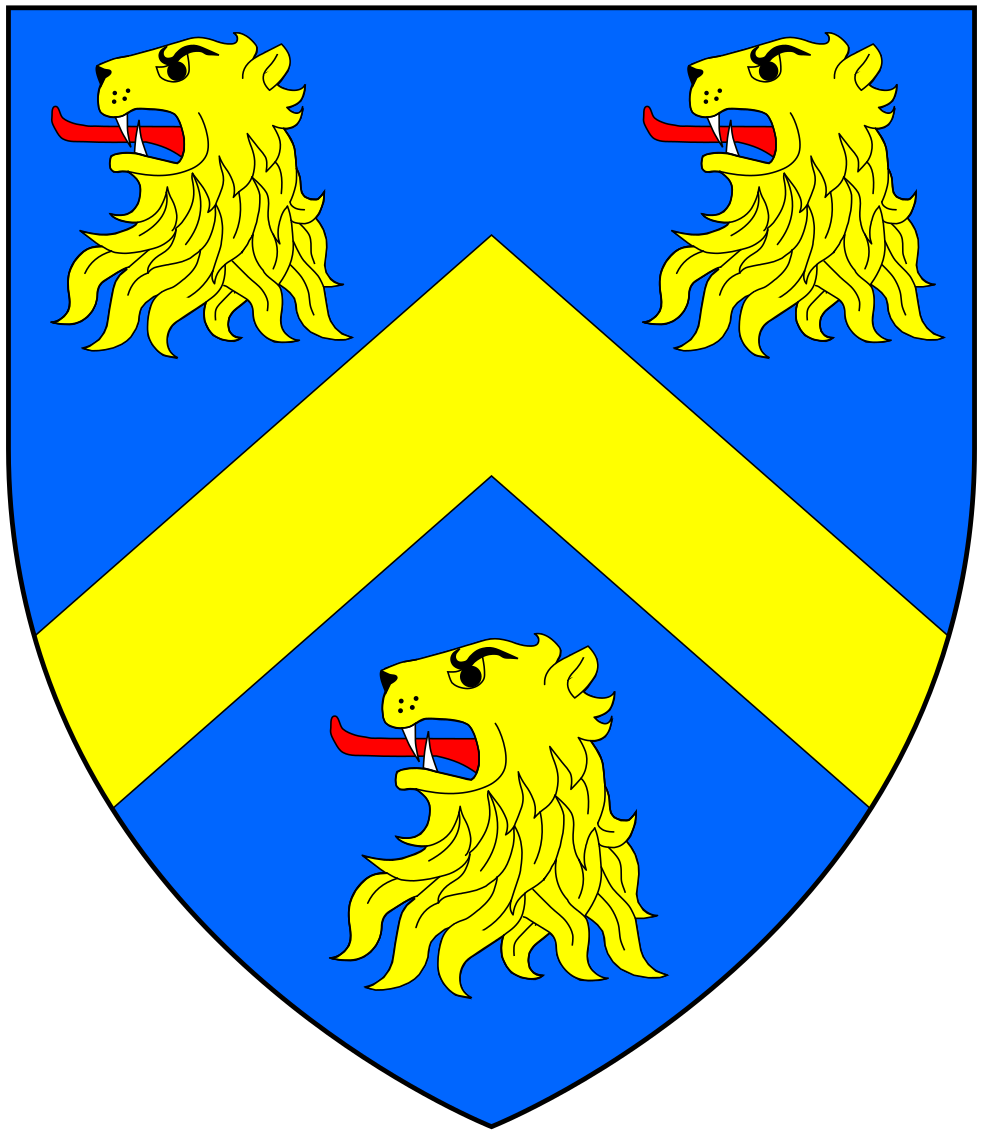
Arms of Wyndham: Azure, a chevron between three lion's heads erased or

Sir Wadham Wyndham (29 October 1609 – 24 December 1668), of Ilton, Somerset and St. Edmund’s College, Salisbury, was a Justice of the King's Bench from 1660 to 1668.

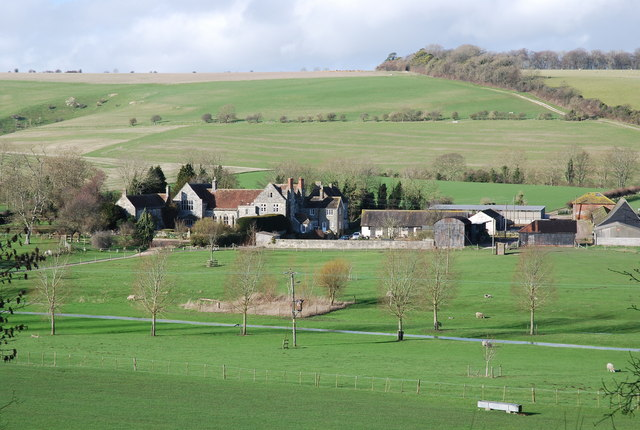
Norrington Manor: Sir Wadham Wyndham's country house which he left to his eldest son, Colonel John Wyndham

== Origins ==
He was born at Orchard Wyndham, Somerset, the ninth son of Sir John Wyndham (1558–1645) of Orchard Wyndham, by his wife, Joan Portman, daughter of Sir Henry Portman of Orchard Portman, Somerset. He was named after the family of his grandmother, Florence Wadham (d.1596), sister and in her issue co-heiress, of Nicholas Wadham (d.1609), of Merryfield, Ilton, founder of Wadham College, Oxford. The estate of Merryfield and lands at Ilton became the inheritance of the Wyndham family, and Wadham Wyndham made his seat at Ilton.

== Legal career ==
Educated at Wadham College, Oxford, he entered Lincoln's Inn on 22 October 1628, being called to the bar on 17 May 1636. He was made a serjeant-at-law by royal authority in October 1660, and took part in the prosecution of the regicides. On 24 November 1660 he was created a Justice of the King's Bench, being knighted by Charles II on 4 December 1660. He remained a judge until 1668.

== The Great Fire ==
After the Great Fire of London in 1666, Sir Wadham Wyndham, along with his brother Sir Hugh Wyndham, was a judge at the Fire Court set up in 1667 to hear cases relating to property destroyed in the fire. The Court sat at Clifford's Inn and focused primarily on deciding who would pay for a property to be rebuilt, and cases were heard and a verdict usually given within a day. The judges worked for free, three to four days a week; without the Fire Court, legal wrangles could have dragged on for months, seriously delaying the rebuilding which was so necessary if London was to recover. As a reward for their efforts, the artist John Michael Wright (c. 1617–1694) was commissioned to paint portraits of all 22 judges that had sat in the Fire Court. While his brother's portrait remains part of the Guildhall Art Gallery collection, Sir Wadham's portrait was destroyed by fire in The Blitz.

== Family life ==
On 12 January 1647 he married Barbara Clarke (1627–1704), daughter of Sir George Clarke (d.1689) of Watford Manor, Watford, Northamptonshire, MP for Northamptonshire in 1661. They had eight sons (two of whom predeceased their father) and four daughters, born between 1648 and 1666.

By the late 1650s, his successful practice at the bar enabled him to purchase the manor of Norrington in Wiltshire, in 1658, and also St Edmund's College in Salisbury, in the same county.

He left Norrington to his eldest son, John Wyndham, and St Edmund's to his 2nd son Wadham Wyndham, whilst his 3rd son William Wyndham purchased in 1689 the Wiltshire manor of Dinton. Sir Wadham thus founded the three Wiltshire branches of the Wyndham family. The Wiltshire MP and topographer Henry Penruddocke Wyndham, and his bon-vivant brother Colonel Wadham Wyndham, were his great-great-grandsons. His grandson Thomas Wyndham, 1st Baron Wyndham, had a career as a judge as distinguished as his grandfather's, ending as Lord Chancellor of Ireland.
