= Henry Penruddocke Wyndham =

British Whig Member of Parliament, topographer and author

Henry Penruddocke Wyndham (1736–1819) was a British Whig Member of Parliament, topographer and author.

== Background ==
Wyndham was born on 4 June 1736, the eldest surviving son of Henry Wyndham of St Edmund's College, Salisbury, and his wife Arundel Penruddocke, daughter of Thomas Penruddocke of Compton Chamberlayne. Colonel Wadham Wyndham was his younger brother and the distinguished judge Sir Wadham Wyndham was his great-great-grandfather.

He was educated at Eton and Wadham College, Oxford, and was elected a fellow of the Society of Antiquaries on 6 February 1777 and a fellow of the Royal Society on 9 January 1783.

== Politics ==
The Wyndhams of the college held great influence in Salisbury, and Wyndham was elected a freeman of the city on 15 March 1761, was Mayor of Salisbury in 1770–1, and High Sheriff of Wiltshire in 1772. In 1794 he commanded a troop of cavalry raised in Salisbury.

In 1795 he was elected Member of Parliament (MP) for Wiltshire. He sat as a Whig in the family tradition until 1812, but rarely attended Parliament. The Whig statesman, William Windham and Prime Minister William Wyndham Grenville, 1st Baron Grenville, were his third cousins.

== Publications ==
By inclination he was more of a topographer than a politician. In 1774 he visited Wales, and in the following year he published anonymously A Gentleman's Tour through Monmouthshire and Wales. He revisited the area in 1777, and in 1781 published his Tour through Monmouthshire and Wales, declaring authorship of the work. He was accompanied on his journey of 1777 by the Swiss watercolourist Samuel Hieronymus Grimm, whose works illustrated the account.

He was keen to produce a county history of Wiltshire and published Wiltshire, Extracted from the Domesday Book with a translation of the Latin into English in 1788 which he hoped might stimulate such a work. His most celebrated publication remains his Diary of the Late George Bubb Dodington in 1784, a rich source of information about politics in the first half of the 18th century.

== Friendship with Turner ==
Like his cousin George Wyndham, 3rd Earl of Egremont, Pen Wyndham was an admirer of the painter Turner who stayed with him at the college on several occasions in the late 18th century. Two paintings of the college landscape made by Turner during his visits of 1798 and c. 1800 are now preserved in the British Museum.

== Family life ==
He married Caroline, daughter and heir of Edmund Hearst, on 18 October 1768 and they had five sons and two daughters. He died on 3 May 1819 and was buried in the Wyndham family vault in St Edmund's Church, Salisbury. He was succeeded by his eldest son, Wadham Wyndham, MP for Salisbury. His sister, Laetitia, married Sir William à Court, 1st Baronet.
