= John Wyndham (died 1573) =

English landowner (??–1573)

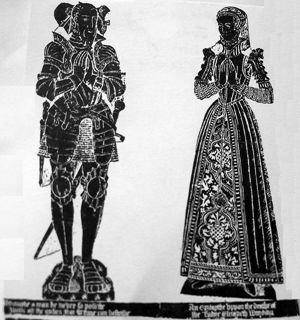
Brass rubbing of monumental brass of Sir John Wyndham (d.1573) and his wife Elizabeth Sydenham (d.1571) on their chest tomb in St Decuman's Church, Watchet

Sir John Wyndham (died 1573) of Orchard Wyndham in the parish of Watchet, Somerset, was born a member of a prominent gentry family in Norfolk and founded his own prominent gentry family in Somerset, which survives today at Orchard Wyndham.

== Origins ==
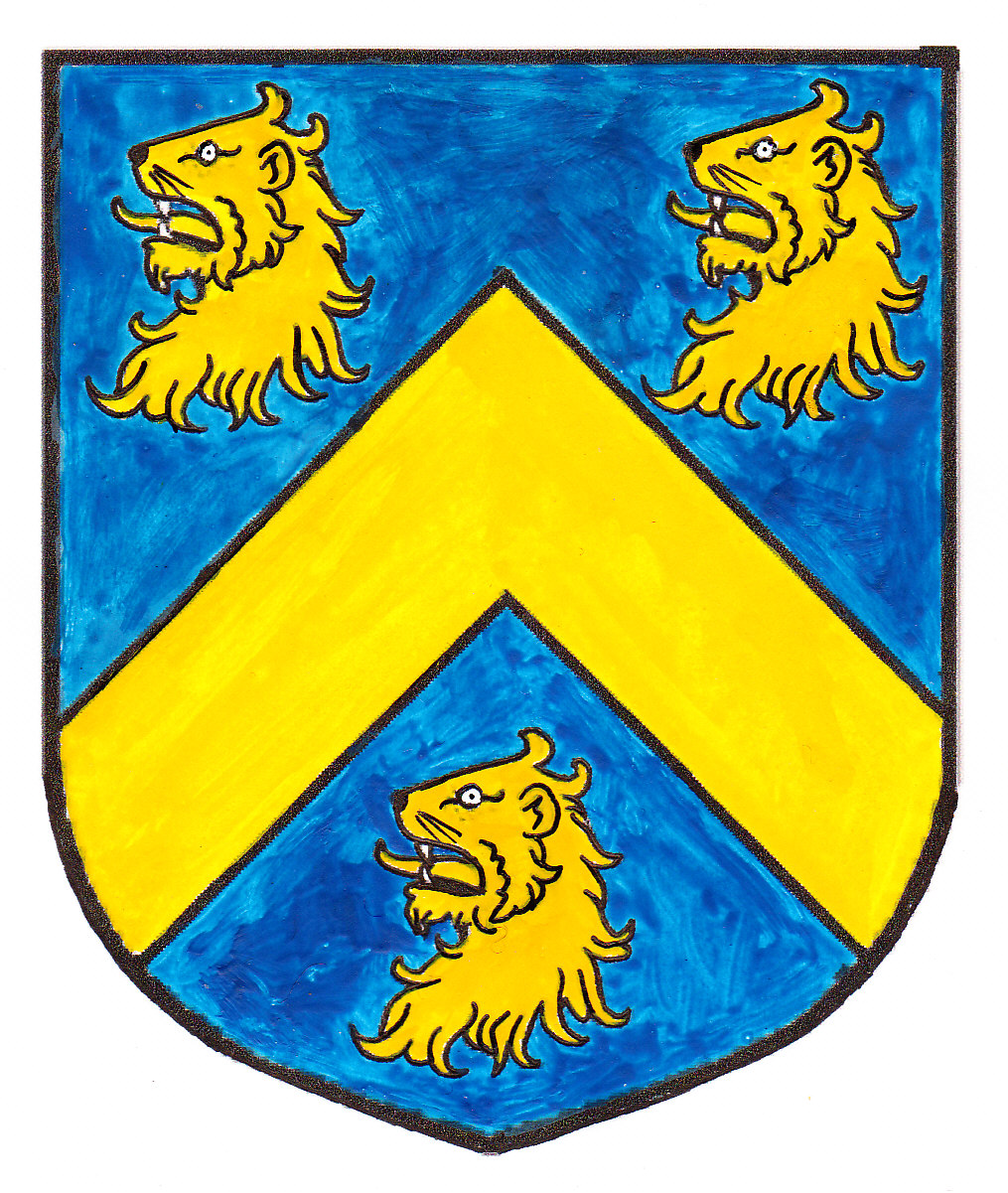
Arms of Wyndham: Azure, a chevron between three lion's heads erased or

John Wyndham was the second son of Sir Thomas Wyndham (d.1521) of Felbrigg Hall, Norfolk, by his first wife Alianore Scrope (c.1470–1505), daughter and heiress of Richard Scrope of Upsall, Yorkshire. Sir Thomas was knighted in 1512 by Sir Edward Howard, Admiral of the Fleet. His will was dated at Felbrigg 22 October 1521 and he was buried in the Chapel of the Blessed Virgin Mary, Norwich Cathedral, from which his body was later moved to the Jesus Chapel. He was the son and heir of Sir John Wyndham (d.1503) by his first wife Lady Margaret Howard, 4th daughter of Sir John Howard, 1st Duke of Norfolk.

Through his father's second marriage Sir John Wyndham was the half-brother of Vice-Admiral Thomas Wyndham.

== Marriage ==
Whilst visiting Dunster Castle in Somerset, the home of his sister Margaret Wyndham, wife of Sir Andrew Luttrell (1484–1538), feudal baron of Dunster, Sir John Wyndham met and later married in 1528 Elizabeth Sydenham, a daughter and co-heiress of Sir John Sydenham and Lady Ursula (née Brydges and sister of John Brydges, 1st Baron Chandos) of Orchard Sydenham in the parish of Watchet, Somerset. Through his wife he inherited the manor of Orchard, which later became known as Orchard Wyndham, which estate is occupied today by his descendants in a direct male line.

== Progeny ==
By his wife Elizabeth Sydenham he had the following progeny:

- John Wyndham (d.1572), of Orchard, who predeceased his father by one year, having married Florence Wadham (1538–1597).
- Edmund Wyndham, Esq. (d.1616), of Kentsford (purchased for him by his father from his brother-in-law Sir Andrew Luttrell (1484–1538) feudal baron of Dunster) in the parish of Watchet, Somerset, who married Margery Chamberlayne.

== Sources ==
- Burke's Genealogical and Heraldic History of the Landed Gentry, 15th Edition, ed. Pirie-Gordon, H., London, 1937, pp. 2510–12, pedigree of Wyndham of Orchard Wyndham
- Collinson's History of Somerset, Vol.3, pp.486-496
- Blomefield, Francis, An Essay Towards a Topographical History of the County of Norfolk, Vol.8, pp107-119, Felbrigg
