= Florence Wadham =

English woman who was buried alive (1538–1596)

Florence Wyndham (1538–1596), wife of Sir John Wyndham (died 1572) of Orchard Wyndham in Somerset, was a daughter of John Wadham (died 1578) of Merryfield, Ilton in Somerset and Edge, Branscombe in Devon, and was a sister and co-heiress of Nicholas Wadham (1531/2 – 1609), co-founder of Wadham College, Oxford.

== Buried alive ==
Her fame rests on an escape from death and her importance to the survival of the Wyndham family.

In 1556, she married Sir John Wyndham of Orchard Wyndham, and a year later was taken ill and thought to have died. She was buried in the Wyndham family vault in St Decuman’s church at Watchet, Somerset. That same night, a covetous sexton opened her coffin in order to remove her rings and cut one of her fingers in the process. She had fallen into some sort of cataleptic trance, and was now awakened by the pain and rose from her coffin. The sexton fled leaving his lantern behind him; and with its aid she made her way home across the fields to her astounded family.

Soon afterwards she gave birth to her only son, Sir John Wyndham (1558–1645), from whom every member of the Wyndham family is descended (apart from a branch of the family in the United States whose progenitor is Vice Admiral Sir Thomas Wyndham, Henry VIII's naval commander).

Her survival and importance as a valuable heiress is celebrated in the family by successive generations naming the eldest son Wadham Wyndham, most especially by the Salisbury branch of St Edmund's College founded by Sir Wadham Wyndham.

=== Source of story ===
The source of the story is unclear, but it appears to have become much embellished over time. Delderfield (1968) calls the sexton a verger, by the name of Attewell. One of the earliest renditions is by the Somerset historian Collinson (d.1793), published in 1791, who was more charitable to the sexton/verger than later narrators and states relatively simply:

"It is said that this lady was the year after her marriage, 1562, (sic, her son was born in 1558) buried, having in a sickness lost all appearance of life; but the sexton hearing some noise in the coffin, as he was closing the vault in the church of St. Decuman's, she was happily taken up, and soon after delivered of Sir John Wyndham".

== Lady Wyndham's Return ==
(See full text on wikisource s:Lady Wyndham's Return A poem about her remarkable escape, called 'Lady Wyndham's Return', was written by Rev. Lewis H. Court, Vicar of St Decuman's church, and includes the following verses:

He seized the slender fingers white
And stiff in their repose
Then sought to file the circlet through;
When to his horror blood he drew,
And the fair sleeper rose

She sat a moment gazed around,
Then great was her surprise,
And sexton startled saw at a glance
This was not death but a deep trance,
And madness leapt to his eyes.

The stagnant life steam in her veins
Again began to flow
She felt the sudden quickening,
For her it was a joyous thing,
For him a fearsome woe.
