= Wadham Wyndham (army officer) =

English officer of the British Army

Colonel Wadham Wyndham (1737–1812) was an English officer of the British Army and accomplished bon vivant.

== Background ==
He was the son of Henry Wyndham and Arundel Penruddocke, and was born in Dinton, Wiltshire, on 29 May 1737 at precisely 55 minutes past five in the morning. He was brought up in St Edmund's College, Salisbury, the house acquired by his great-grandfather Sir Wadham Wyndham, and seat of one of the county's most influential families.

His early appetite for constant and varied amusement is depicted in the double portrait by Joseph Highmore of 1743, which shows his brother Pen studying while the young Wadham tries to entice him into the garden with a tennis racket.

== Military career ==
He was commissioned ensign and lieutenant in the 2nd Regiment of Foot Guards on 13 January 1753. He was promoted to lieutenant and captain on 3 May 1758, and on 2 July 1771, to captain and lieutenant-colonel. He retired from the Army on 13 December 1778. At the time it was required that commissions were purchased and in his will his father records having paid £3,200 in total for the purpose, a not inconsiderable sum.

== Social accomplishments ==
Wyndham's military career did not prevent him from continuing to enjoy most of his regular amusements. One evening in 1765, after one of the monthly dance assemblies at Tucket's establishment in Salisbury, he began playing cards with Edmund Hearst, father of his brother's future wife Caroline, at one in the morning and the game did not end until ten the next morning, by which time Wadham had won 15 shillings.

On 9 July 1766 he and his sister, Laetitia, organised a musical entertainment on the river at Salibsury with eight boats in all, some holding 25 people, one boat comprising the party of musicians. In the summer of 1768 he contrived to absent himself from his battalion duties at the Tower of London in order to enjoy Ascot with his cousins the William Pitts of Kingston, a few days later entertaining his aunt Barbara Wyndham by taking her to Vauxhall and Ranelagh.

However, later in the same year George III's summer review of all regiments in England prevented him from attending the Salisbury races where his cousin William Wyndham of Dinton was a steward. He reached home, however, in time to stay with the Portmans at Bryanston for the Blandford Races and to accompany his father on 12 August to their Exton estate for the shooting season.

== Wealth ==
His ability to enjoy so much that life had to offer was made possible by a charming personality and considerable inherited wealth. As well as a sizeable inheritance from his father and from his cousin Wadham Wyndham of Eversley, in 1777 he also came into a considerable parcel of property of George Bubb Dodington, Baron Melcombe, via his cousin Thomas Wyndham MP of Kentsford and Hammersmith. Bubb Dodington's papers went to Colonel Wadham's brother, Henry Penruddocke Wyndham, resulting in the publishing of the famous diary. Despite a lifetime of continuous expenditure, at his death in 1812 his estate was valued at over £500,000.

== Family life ==
He had purchased a house in Charlotte Street, Bloomsbury, London, in 1771, and with his wife Sarah, née Leander, (they were married at St George's, Hanover Square on 14 December 1812) he had three sons and six daughters. He died on 16 December 1812 at Charlotte Street. His eldest son, Wadham Wyndham (1793-1849), was a captain in the Royal Bucks Militia and his second son, Colonel Charles Wyndham, was a subaltern at Waterloo with the Scots Greys, a regiment he later commanded.

== Bibliography ==
- Wyndham, the Hon H A, "A Family History, The Wyndhams of Somerset, Sussex and Wiltshire", 1950.
- Donald Burrows and Rosemary Dunhill, "Music and Theatre in Handel's World", 2002.
- Henry Wyndham's Family Bible, Hampshire Records, Winchester, 8M49 F11.
