= Wadham Wyndham (political supporter) =

Wadham Wyndham (1793–1849) DL JP was the eldest son of Colonel Wadham Wyndham and an influential figure in Tory politics in the first half of 19th century Britain.

== Background ==
Inheriting a considerable fortune from his father in 1813, including Buckinghamshire property originally owned by George Dodington, 1st Baron Melcombe of Hellfire Club fame, Wadham Wyndham acquired Beech Lodge near Great Marlow to concentrate on supporting the political ambitions and career of his friend and cousin Richard Plantagenet Temple-Nugent-Brydges-Chandos-Grenville, 2nd Duke of Buckingham and Chandos, known from 1822 to 1839 by the courtesy title of Marquess of Chandos. Chandos became MP for Buckinghamshire in 1818 and remained MP until succeeding to the dukedom in 1839.

== Political activities ==
Wadham Wyndham was a steady and constant supporter of the Marquess of Chandos throughout his time as an MP and later Lord Privy Seal until Chandos retired from government in 1842. He is particularly remembered for organising a series of large and successful political dinners, a familiar feature of early 19th century politics, during Chandos's long and not entirely popular opposition to the repeal of the Corn Laws.

Wadham's rewards for unwavering political loyalty were in the customary currency of the time; he was made a Deputy Lieutenant of Buckinghamshire, during the time Chandos was Lord Lieutenant of the county, and a captain in the 2nd Bucks Regiment of Yeomanry when Chandos, when Chandos, as 2nd Duke of Buckingham, became its Colonel in 1839.

== Family and Descendants ==
In 1866 Wadham Wyndham married Anne Stanley daughter of the Rev Edward Stanley (d.1812) of Dublin (only son and heir of Arthur Stanley, Governor of the Bank of Ireland and Elizabeth Handcock, sister to William Handcock, 1st Viscount Castlemaine). Wadham Wyndham had eight sons, six of whom survived into adulthood, and one daughter.

Of his surviving sons, Florance Wyndham (1836–1897), married Emily Wentworth Francklin, eldest daughter of Rev William Francklin and Penelope Atkins-Bowyer; she was the great-granddaughter of both Michael Francklin, Lieutenant Governor of Nova Scotia and the Hon Behning Wentworth, Colonial Secretary for Nova Scotia (himself a nephew of Benning Wentworth, Royal Governor of New Hampshire). Florance was the inventor of Esprit des Oeufs, or Egg Spirit as he typically referred to it, a commercial bottling of a kind of eggnog which achieved great popularity and a global distribution in the second half of the 19th century.

Penruddocke Wyndham married Mary Peto, eldest daughter of Sir Samuel Morton Peto, 1st Baronet. Arthur Wyndham (1819–1906), married Mary Cornelia Ranclaud, daughter of Dr Mark Alexander Ranclaud, and became a Lieut-Colonel in the fifth regiment of Native Infantry of the Honourable East India Company.

Two of Wadham Wyndham's younger sons, William and Alexander, emigrated to Australia in the 1850s. William died in an accident on Christmas Day 1884. Through Alexander (d.1915), Wadham Wyndham's Australian descendants include prominent educator Sir Harold Wyndham, musician Claire Wyndham, as well as notable surgeons, academics and business people.

The two sons who did not survive in Chandos, to whom the 2nd Duke of Buckingham stood Godfather born in 1828, and Wadham, who drowned in 1839 when a boat he was in was rowed too close to a weir on the River Thames at Marlow.

Wadham Wyndham died from bronchitis with asthma in 1849. His descendants in Great Britain continue in the female line through Florance Wyndham's daughter, Alice Wyndham, including the noted UK marketing and advertising pioneer Malcolm Wyndham Ashworth.
