= Orchard Wyndham =

Grade I listed building in West Somerset, United Kingdom

Coordinates: 51°09′04.7″N 3°19′40.7″W

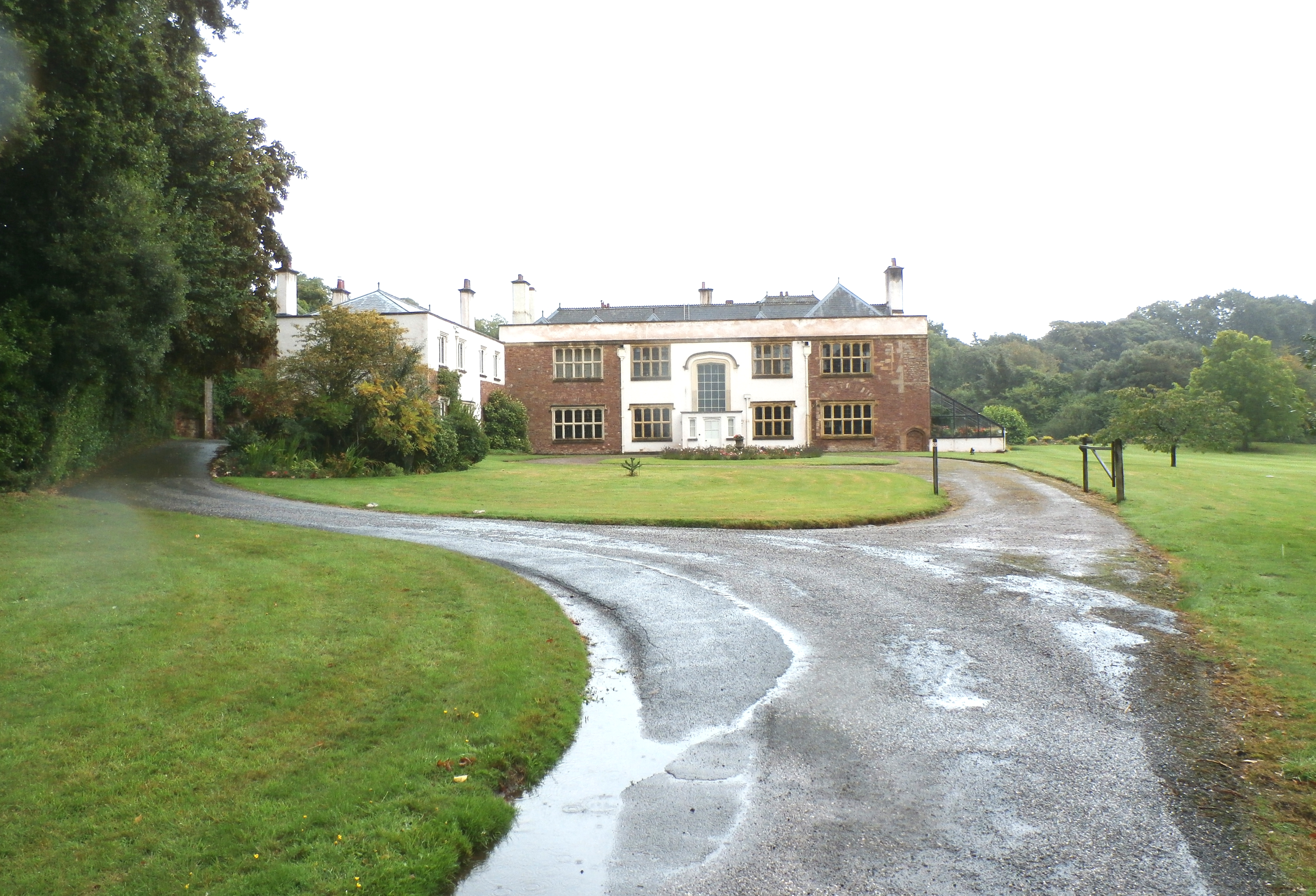
Orchard Wyndham, west front

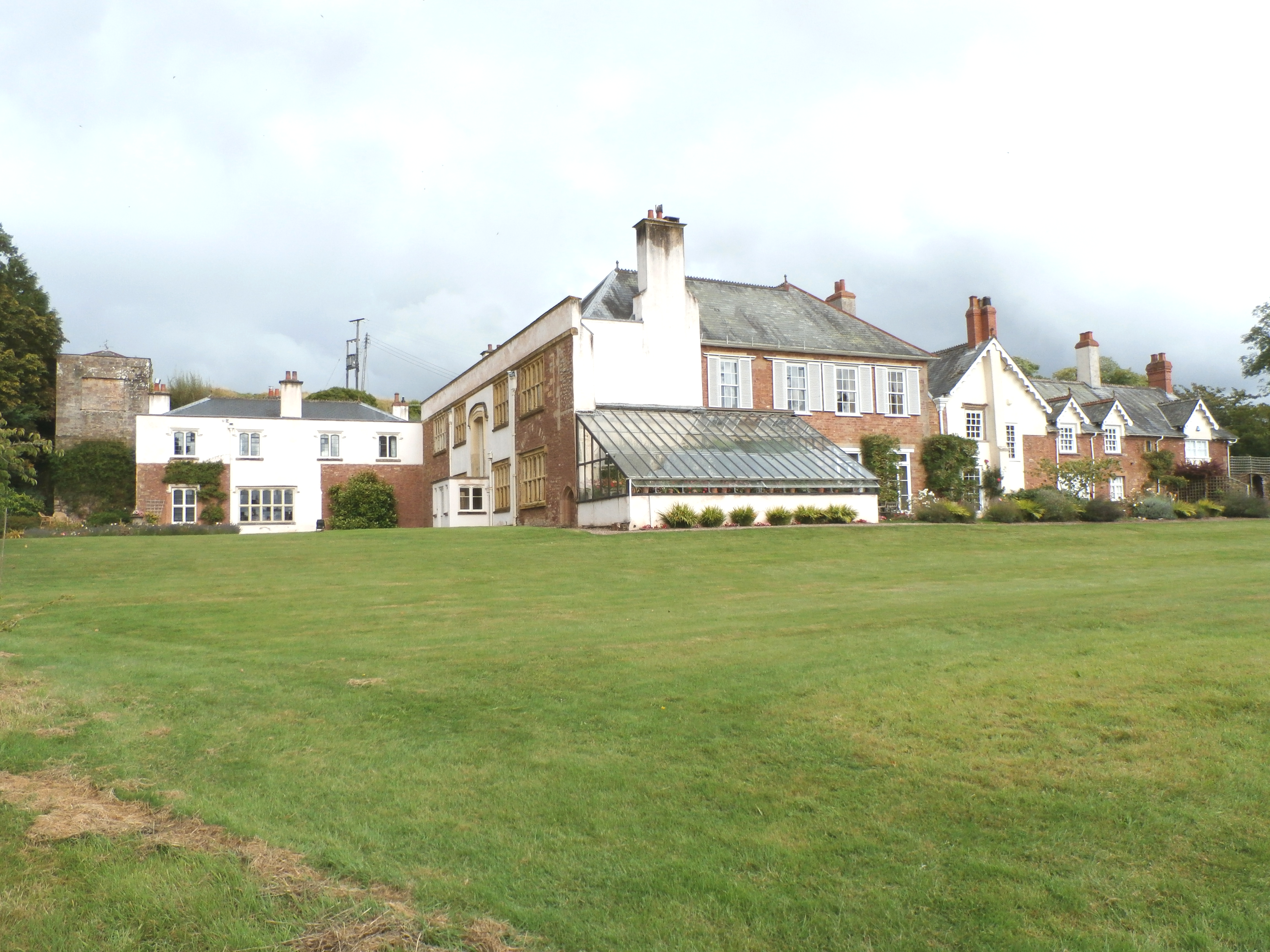
Orchard Wyndham, south front

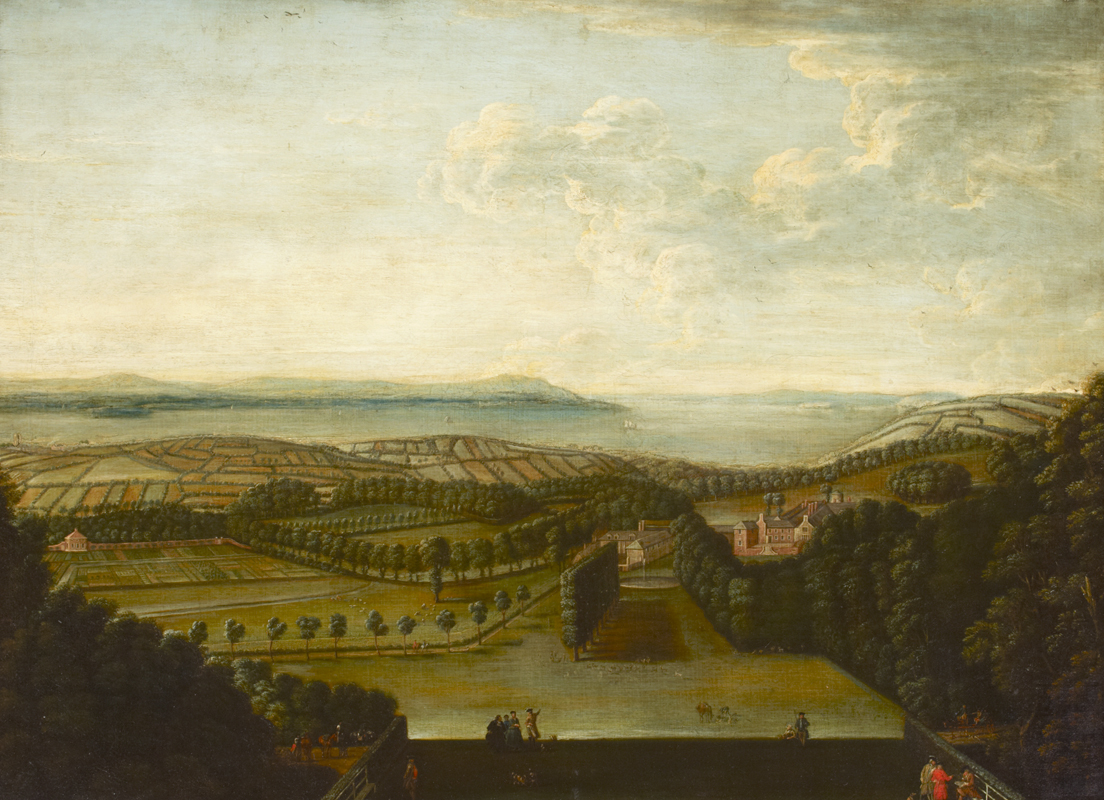
Painting of Orchard Wyndham, 18th century English School, National Trust, collection of Petworth House. Northward beyond the house is the town of Watchet and its harbour (with pier built by Sir William Wyndham, 3rd Baronet (1687–1740)), historically part of the estate, on the Bristol Channel

Orchard Wyndham is a historic manor near Williton in Somerset, centred on the synonymous grade I listed manor house of Orchard Wyndham that was situated historically (Note: The town of Williton has since developed and established its own parish church) in the parish of Watchet and about two miles south of the parish church of St Decuman's, Watchet. (Note: St Decuman's, Watchet contains important monuments to the Wyndham family and plays a central role in the famous story of the quasi-resurrection of Florence Wyndham in the 16th century) Parts of the manor house are medieval. It has been owned for more than 700 years by the prominent Wyndham family, who continue there as of 2015.

== History ==
There is evidence of occupation of the site from Roman and Saxon times. The estate was originally called "Orchard", possibly a corruption of the Saxon family name "De Horcherd". In the 12th century the family of Elfric de Orchard held another nearby manor in Somerset, now called Orchard Portman which was inherited by the Portman family.

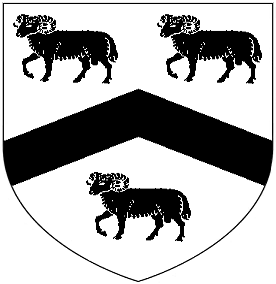
Arms of Sydenham of Orchard Sydenham: Argent, a chevron between three rams passant guardant sable. These are the arms of Sydenham of Sydenham differenced by a chevron sable

In 1448 the estate passed into the hands of the Sydenham family of nearby Combe Sydenham, and was thenceforth known as Orchard Sydenham. The Sydenham family originated at the manor of Sydenham near Bridgwater, Somerset. Elizabeth Sydenham (died 1571) inherited the house and in 1528 married Sir John Wyndham (died 1573), from Norfolk.

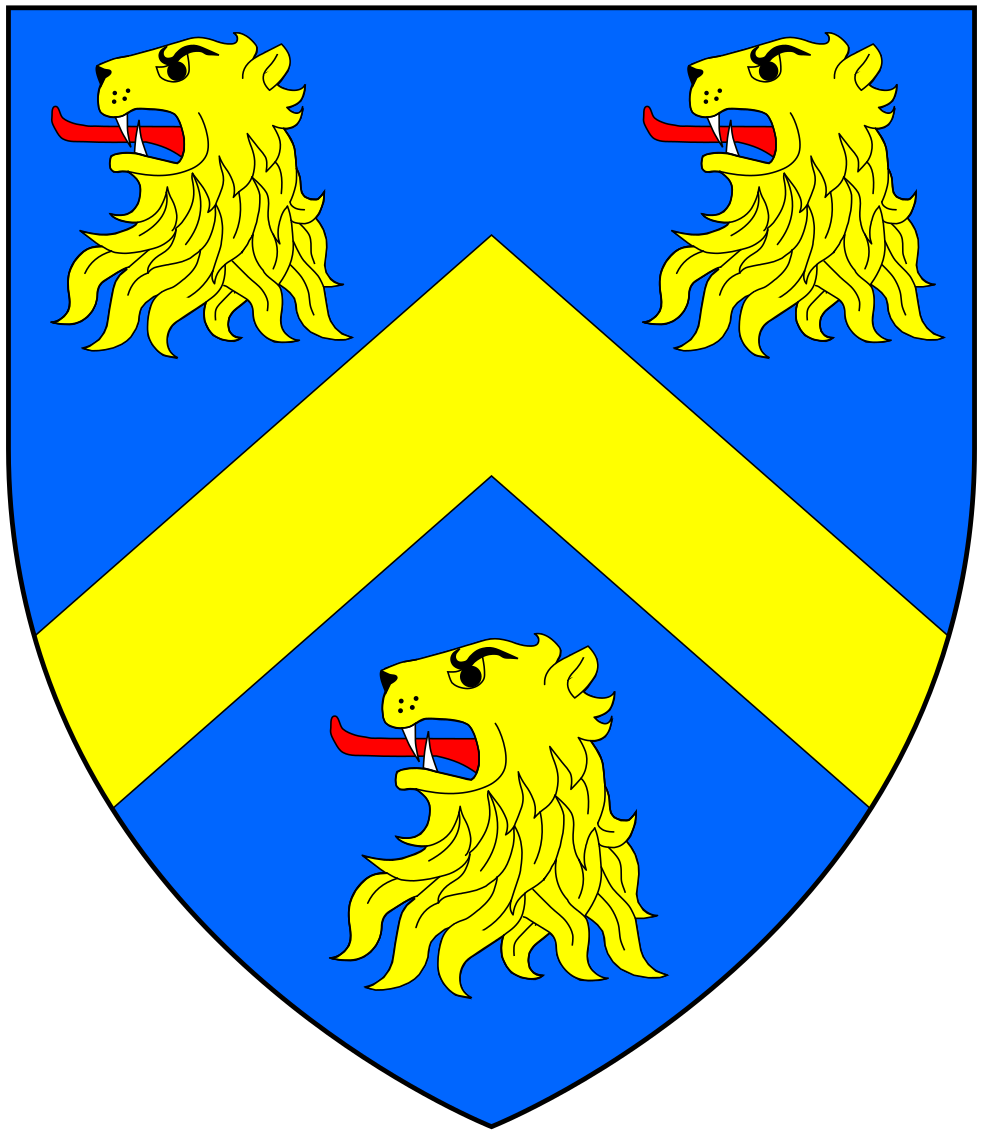
Arms of Wyndham: Azure, a chevron between three lion's heads erased or

The descent of Orchard Wyndham in the Wyndham family is as follows:

- Sir John Wyndham (died 1573): He was the second son of Sir Thomas Wyndham (died 1521) of Felbrigg in Norfolk by his first wife Eleanor Scrope. He inherited Orchard from his wife Elizabeth Sydenham (died 1/1/1571), daughter and co-heiress of Sir John Sydenham of Orchard Sydenham, Somerset.
- Sir John Wyndham (1558–1645): Grandson. He was the only child of Sir John Wyndham (1516–1572) of Kentsford House, Watchet, who predeceased his own father, by his wife Florence Wadham (died 1596), a sister and co-heiress of Nicholas Wadham, founder, with his wife Dorothy Wadham, of Wadham College.
- John Wyndham (died 1649): Second and eldest surviving son, who married Catherine Hopton daughter of Robert Hopton of Witham, Somerset, and sister of Ralph Hopton, 1st Baron Hopton (died 1652).
- Sir William Wyndham, 1st Baronet (c. 1632 – 1683): Eldest son, of Orchard. He was member of parliament for Somerset 1656-1658 and for Taunton 1660–1679, was made a Baronet in 1661, "of Orchard, Somerset". It was during the tenure of the 1st Baronet that Orchard became known as Orchard Wyndham.
- Sir Edward Wyndham, 2nd Baronet (c. 1667 – 1695): Son and heir. He was MP for Ilchester three times.
- Sir William Wyndham, 3rd Baronet (1687–1740): He was a Jacobite leader firmly opposed to the Hanoverian succession and was leader of the Tory opposition in the House of Commons during the reign of King George I (1714–1727) and during the early years of King George II (1727–1760). In 1715 an officer was sent to Orchard Wyndham to arrest him for suspected high treason but he escaped from his bedroom and rode away on a waiting horse. A royal proclamation was subsequently issued for his arrest, with a £1,000 reward offered. He later handed himself in to the authorities and spent time in the Tower of London.
- Charles Wyndham, 2nd Earl of Egremont (1710–1763): He succeeded to the Orchard Wyndham estates and as 4th baronet on his father's death in 1740. He abandoned Orchard Wyndham as his principal seat in favour of Petworth House.
- George Wyndham, 3rd Earl of Egremont (1751–1837): Eldest son, who lived principally at Petworth.
- George Wyndham, 4th Earl of Egremont (1785–1845): Nephew. He died without male children.
- William Wyndham (1834–1914): Of Dinton House (of which estate he was William Wyndham), Wiltshire. He was heir male to his grandfather William Wyndham (1769–1841), of Dinton, under the will of his distant cousin (who shared common descent from Sir John Wyndham (1558–1645) of Orchard Wyndham) George Wyndham, 4th Earl of Egremont, following the death of the 4th Earl's widow in 1876 who had retained a life interest in his estate. He thus inherited the ancient family manor of Orchard Wyndham. He married in 1867 Frances Ann Stafford (died 1934), the second daughter of Charles James Stafford, vicar of Dinton.
- William Wyndham (1868–1951): Eldest son, of Orchard Wyndham. He sold Dinton in 1916 and made Orchard Wyndham his main seat, where he lived with his five unmarried sisters. In 1951 he died unmarried and without children. His next younger brother Alward Wyndham (1877–1937), was already dead, having disappeared without trace to South America, and in 1909-10 was committed to Napa State Hospital, California, U.S.A. for temporary treatment for insanity. Orchard Wyndham was therefore inherited by his next younger brother Capt. John Wyndham.
- Capt. John Wyndham (1879–1966): Welsh Regiment, JP, younger brother, formerly of Court Place, Bathealton, Somerset. In 1915 he married Maud Colville, a daughter of Archibald Colville of Motherwell, Scotland, a director of David Colville & Sons, one of the largest steelworks in Scotland, founded by his father.
- George Colville Wyndham (1916–1982): Son, an officer of the Indian Civil Service before 1947, who in 1939 married Anne Dorothy Hodder Hodder-Williams.
- William Wadham Wyndham (born 1940): Eldest son and heir, the owner of Orchard Wyndham as of 2015. Educated at Eton and Wadham College, Oxford, the founding and building of which in 1609 had been supervised by his ancestor Sir John Wyndham (1558–1645) on behalf of his deceased uncle Nicholas Wadham (died 1609). He does not however reside at Orchard Wyndham, which is the home of his sister Sylvana Margery Glazebrook Chandler (born 1944, née Wyndham), High Sheriff of Somerset in 2012, and her husband Richard T. Chandler. The estate had formerly been managed by his younger sister Dr Katherine Stafford Heathcote Wyndham (1947–2004), an art historian and director of the Somerset Building Preservation Trust, who was responsible for the refurbishment and renovation of the house in 1996–2000. He is the author of "Orchads, Collected Poems", "Peers in Parliament Reformed" and "Olivacea: Poems 2011-2016".

== Description ==
The house was designated by English Heritage in 1969 as a Grade I listed building, while the Bailiff's House, Lodge, remains of the walled garden and gate are also listed.

The Giant's Cave which is also known as the Blue Grotto, within the grounds, is a landscape feature in the form of a ruin, dating from the mid 18th century. It consists of large undressed blocks of red sandstone, irregularly placed in sections of wall about 2.5 metres high.

== Estate ==
Today the estate retains substantial local landholdings and also land at Ilton, Somerset, where the "Wyndham Estate" is the largest employer in the village and where the public house is called the "Wyndham Arms". This land was formerly part of the Merryfield estate which the family inherited from Nicholas Wadham (died 1609) of Edge, Branscombe, Devon and Merryfield, Ilton, Somerset.

=== Return of Owners of Land 1873 ===
The Return of Owners of Land, 1873 (as corrected in 1883) revealed the holdings of Wyndham of Orchard Wyndham and Dinton in total as 23,708 acres worth £37,420 per annum as follows:

- Somerset 11,231 acres (of which 2,866 Wyndham of Dinton)
- Devon 6,740 acres
- Wilts 5,734 acres (all Wyndham of Dinton)
- Surrey 3 acres

=== Principal historic estates ===
The principal historic estates of the family were as follows:

- Somerset: Orchard Wyndham, St Decuman's, Watchet, Williton, Beer Crocombe, Brean Down, Chiselborough, Ilton, Kingsbury Episcopi, Pitcombe.
- Devon: Bondleigh, Silverton.
- Wiltshire: Allington, Dinton, Mere, Norrington, Salisbury, Slaughterford, Trowbridge.
- Dorset: Hawkchurch, Mappowder, Sturminster Marshall.
- Gloucestershire: Hawling.
- Hampshire: Binsted Popham, Christchurch, Hinton Admiral, Milton, Yateley.
- Shropshire: Beckbury.

== See also ==
- Grade I listed buildings in West Somerset

== Sources ==
- Ketton-Cremer, Robert Wyndham, Felbrigg, the Story of a House, London, 1962
- Collinson, John, History and Antiquities of the County of Somerset, Volume 3, London, 1791, pp. 488–491: Orchard
