= Wadhams =

Wadhams is a surname. Notable people with the surname include:

- Dick Wadhams (born 1955), Republican political consultant
- Edgar Philip Prindle Wadhams (1817–1891), the first bishop of the Roman Catholic Diocese of Ogdensburg
- Peter Wadhams (born 1948), professor of Ocean Physics, Head of the Polar Ocean Physics Group in the University of Cambridge
- Tony Wadhams (born 1944), English former athlete

Wadham is also a surname. Notable people with the surname include:

- Amber Wadham (born 1996), Australian internet personality, also known as Paladin Amber
- Dorothy Wadham (1534/35–1618), wife of Nicholas, co-founder of Wadham College, Oxford
- Jemma Wadham, British glacial biochemist
- John Wadham
- John Wadham (d. 1578)
- John Wadham (MP)
- Nicholas Wadham (disambiguation)
- William Wadham (Australian politician) (c. 1815–1895), politician in South Australia
- William Wadham (died 1452), High Sheriff of Devon, England
- William Joseph Wadham (1863–1950), English painter in Australia
