= William Wadham (died 1452) =

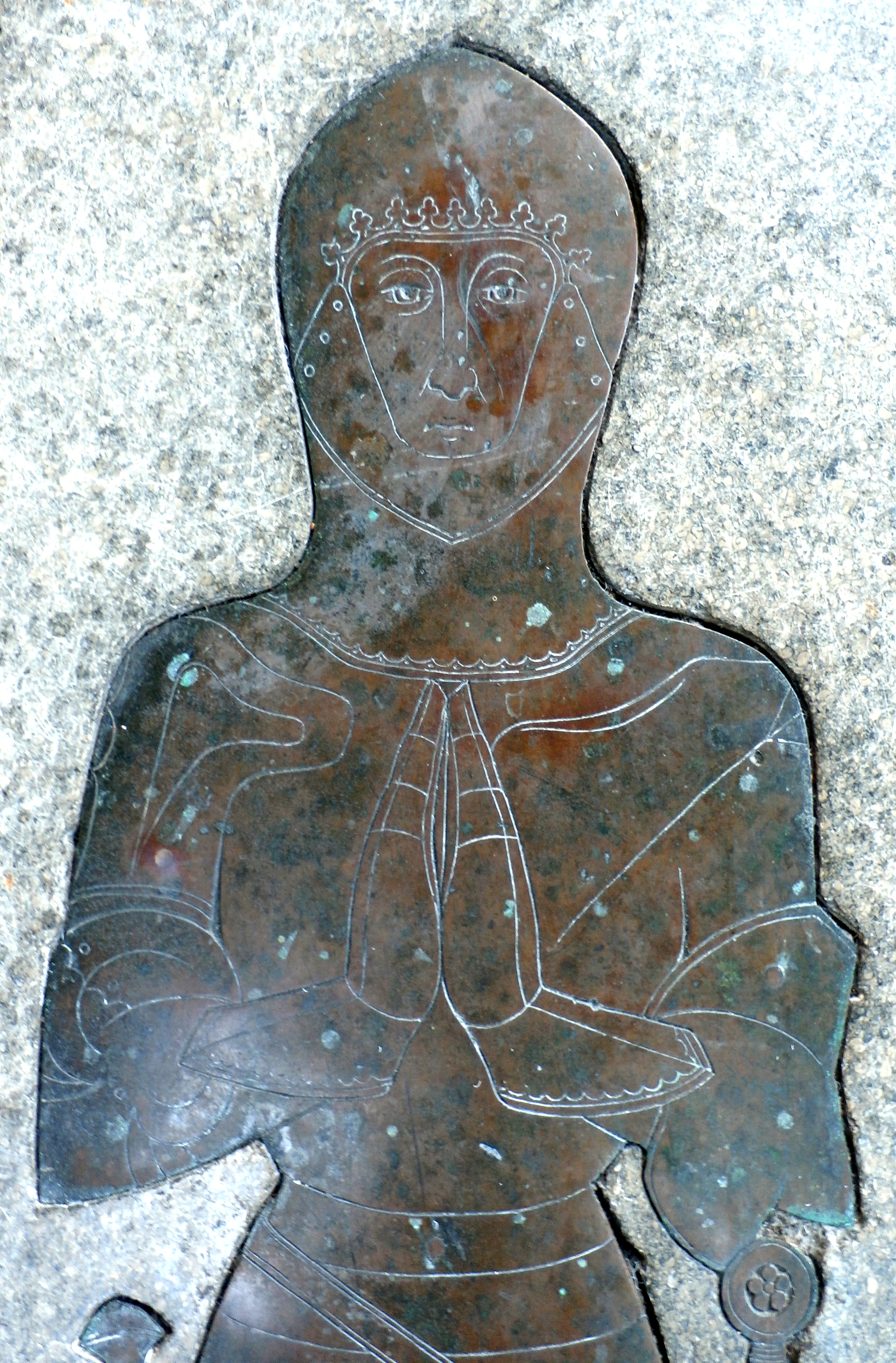
William Wadham (died 1452), detail from his monumental brass in St Mary's Church, Ilminster, Somerset

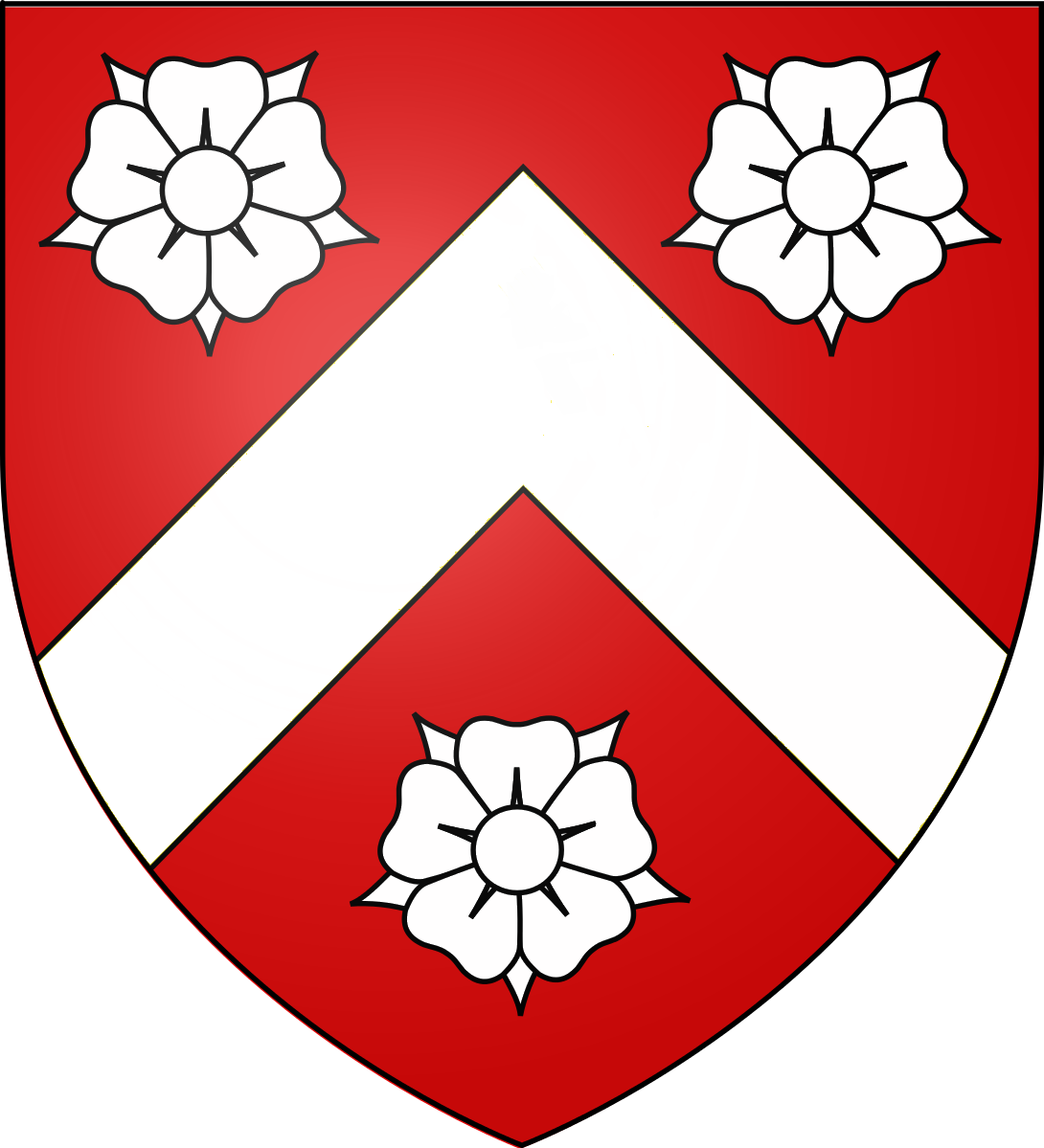
Arms of Wadham: Gules, a chevron between three roses argent

Sir William Wadham (c.1386–1452) of Merryfield in the parish of Ilton, Somerset and Edge in the parish of Branscombe, Devon came from a West Country gentry family with a leaning towards the law, who originally took their name from the manor of Wadham in the parish of Knowstone, between South Molton and Exmoor, north Devon.

His father, Sir John Wadham, was a Justice of the Common Pleas from 1389 to 1398, during the reign of King Richard II; one of many Devonians of the period described by Thomas Fuller in his Worthies of England as seemingly "innated with a genius to study law."

William Wadham was Sheriff of Devon in 1442.

His monumental brass and chest tomb in the Church of St Mary, Ilminster is said by William Henry Hamilton Rogers to depict him with his mother Joan Wrottesley, daughter of Sir William Wrottesley of Blore and Joan Bassett of Drayton Bassett, both in Staffordshire. It is among the best surviving brasses from the fifteenth century, and depicts him in complete plate armour exported to England by Milanese armorers; the finest of the period. His mother is wearing 'widow's weeds'.

William Wadham married Margaret Chiseldon, a daughter and co-heiress of John Chiseldon of the manor of Holcombe Rogus, Devon, Sheriff of Devon in 1406, who brought the Wadhams the manors of Penselwood, Aunk, South Tawton, and Rewe, where his arms impaling his wife's may be seen carved on the pews at the Church of St Mary the Virgin. They had eight children.

On the death of Margaret Chiseldon, he married Katherine Payne, the widow of his brother-in-law's uncle, John Stourton (died 1438), of the manors of Preston Plucknett and Brympton d'Evercy near Yeovil, Somerset. There were no children by this marriage.

Sir William lies buried with his mother in the transept traditionally known as 'the Wadham aisle' in the Church of St Mary, Ilminster, built in spectacular Perpendicular English Gothic style from the local Hamstone, of which there is every reason to believe he was the builder. Sir Nikolaus Pevsner, in South and West Somerset, described the chantry as "... a glass-house. Only the panelled buttresses seem to remain of solid wall. The windows are transomed. Decorated parapet and pinnacles".

== Origins ==
Sir William was the eldest surviving son and heir of the judge, Sir John Wadham of Merryfield and Edge, ancestor to Jane Seymour, King Edward VI and the Seymour Dukes of Somerset, Justice of the Common Pleas from 1389 to 1398: "All I have met with him further" wrote his Devonshire biographer John Prince "is this encomium; that being free of speech, he mingled it well with discretion, so that he never touched any man how mean so ever out of order, either for sport or spight; but with alacrity of spirit and soundness of understanding menaged all his proceedings." Sir John Wadham was MP for Exeter in 1379, and for Devon in 1401 as a Knight of the Shire with Sir Philip Courtenay of Powderham, a son of the Earl of Devon.

William Wadham's mother Joan Wrothesley was a sister of Sir Hugh Wrottesley of Blore, founder member and eighteenth Knight of the Garter in 1348. Married in 1385, Joan was the second wife of John Wadham, who had married first a certain Maud, by whom he had a son.

Sir William's father, 'the judge', had acquired land in Devon, Somerset, Dorset and Gloucestershire, which was valued at £82 per annum in an incomplete survey of 1412, and at about £115 in his inquisition post mortem. His Devon landholdings included the manors of Silverton and half the manor of Harberton, both purchased, in 1386 and 1390, respectively, from Cecily Turberville, sister and heiress of John Beauchamp, 3rd Baron Beauchamp of Somerset), the manor of Lustleigh, purchased in 1403, and land he acquired at Branscombe and elsewhere.

His landholdings in Somerset were even more extensive than those in Devon and mostly consisted of properties forfeited by Sir John Cary (died 1395), Chief Baron of the Exchequer. These lands included Hardington Mandeville, a moiety of Chilton Cantelo, and premises in Trent (now in Dorset) which he purchased in 1389, jointly with his lifelong friend and colleague Sir William Hankford (c.1350–1423) of Annery, Monkleigh in Devon, Chief Justice of the King's Bench from 1413 until 1423, and Sir John Hill, Justice of the King's Bench from 1389 to 1407, later related to the Wadhams by marriage.

These large landholdings in Somerset appear to have moved his principal interest away from Devon and the manor of Edge, and towards the end of his life he made his principal residence at Merryfield, Ilton, near Ilminster, Somerset, which he had purchased from Cecily Turberville. At Merryfield he built, in about 1400, a substantial fortified manor house, still known locally as 'Wadham's Castle' but demolished after 1618, of which only the rectangular moat survives today in the middle of agricultural land south of RNAS Merryfield aerodrome.

William Wadham's sister, Margery Wadham, was the wife of John Stourton, 1st Baron Stourton (1400–1462) of Stourton in Wiltshire; they were great-great-grandparents of Queen Jane Seymour.

Another sister, Elisabeth, sometimes called 'Isabella' Wadham, married Sir Robert Hill of Shilston (died c.1426) who, like his father-in-law, became a Justice of the Common Pleas, from 1408 to 1423, during the reigns of Henry Bolingbroke (later King Henry IV) and King Henry V. They retired to Shilston near Modbury in Devon where their eldest son, Robert Hill of Shilston (c.1392–1444), married Margaret Champernowne of Modbury (1396–1434), and became Sheriff of Devon in 1428.

One of the younger sons of this marriage was Robert Hill of Houndstone, father-in-law to Sir Nicholas Wadham (1472–1542) who, by descent from the Champernowne, Hill and Gilbert families, was a cousin of the Devonshire adventurers Sir Walter Raleigh, Sir Humphrey Gilbert, and Sir Richard Grenville. Sir Nicholas was grandfather to the Nicholas Wadham (1531–1609) who posthumously co-founded Wadham College, Oxford with his wife Dorothy Wadham who, outliving him, and in her advanced old age, saw the project through to completion.

== Marriage and children ==
Sir William Wadham first married and had children with Margaret Chiseldon, a daughter and co-heiress of John Chiseldon of Holcombe Rogus in Devon, and of Penselwood, Aunk, South Tawton and Rewe, who was Sheriff of Devon in 1406. Margaret Wadham's sister, Maude Chiseldon inherited the Manor of Holcombe Rogus and a moiety of the Penselwood estate, and married Sir John Bluett of the nearby Greenham Barton and Cothay Manor, Sheriff of Devon in 1445.

Sir William and Lady Wadham had eight children including:

- Sir John Wadham, born in 1405, the eldest son and heir, who married Elizabeth Popham, a daughter and co-heiress of Sir Stephen Popham of Popham, Hampshire, five times MP for Hampshire, who commanded on the right wing at the Battle of Agincourt in 1415. Another branch of the Popham family was later seated at Huntworth in Somerset, home of Sir John Popham, Speaker of the House of Commons, Attorney General, Lord Chief Justice of England from 1592 to 1607, and financier in 1607 with Ferdinando Gorges of Popham Colony in America.
- Lawrence Wadham married Jane Hody, daughter of Sir William Hody, Attorney General in 1485, Chief Baron of the Exchequer from 1485 to 1513, the son of Sir John Hody, Chief Justice of the King's Bench from 1440 to 1442.
- William Wadham, of Catherston Leweston, Dorset, married Jane, daughter and co-heiress of William Payne of Catherston, Dorset where he founded a cadet branch of the Wadham family which included, John Wadham (c.1520–1584), Recorder of Lyme Regis, MP for Melcombe Regis (1553) and Weymouth (1554), and Captain of Sandsfoot Castle, Weymouth. His inscribed monumental brass survives in Whitchurch Canonicorum Church, Dorset. William Wadham of Catherston inherited the manor of Aunk from his mother, and was Sheriff of Somerset and Dorset in 1520.
- James Wadham, sole patron of the living of Penselwood in 1481. The Penselwood estate stayed in the Wadham family until the death in 1609 of Nicholas Wadham.
- Elizabeth Wadham, wife of Sir Robert Stawell, of Cothelstone Manor, Somerset;
- Margaret Wadham, wife of Gilbert Yarde son of Richard Yarde, Sheriff of Devon in 1442, of Bradley Manor near Newton Abbott in Devon, now maintained by the National Trust (NT);
- Ann Wadham, wife of William Montacute, of Henley Manor, Crewkerne, Somerset;
- Joan Wadham, first of three wives of Thomas Malet (died 1502) of Curry Mallet and of Enmore, Deandon and St Audries, Devon. Their second son, Sir Baldwin Malet of West Quantoxhead, was Solicitor General to King Henry VIII from 1531 to 1533.

== Monument at Ilminster ==
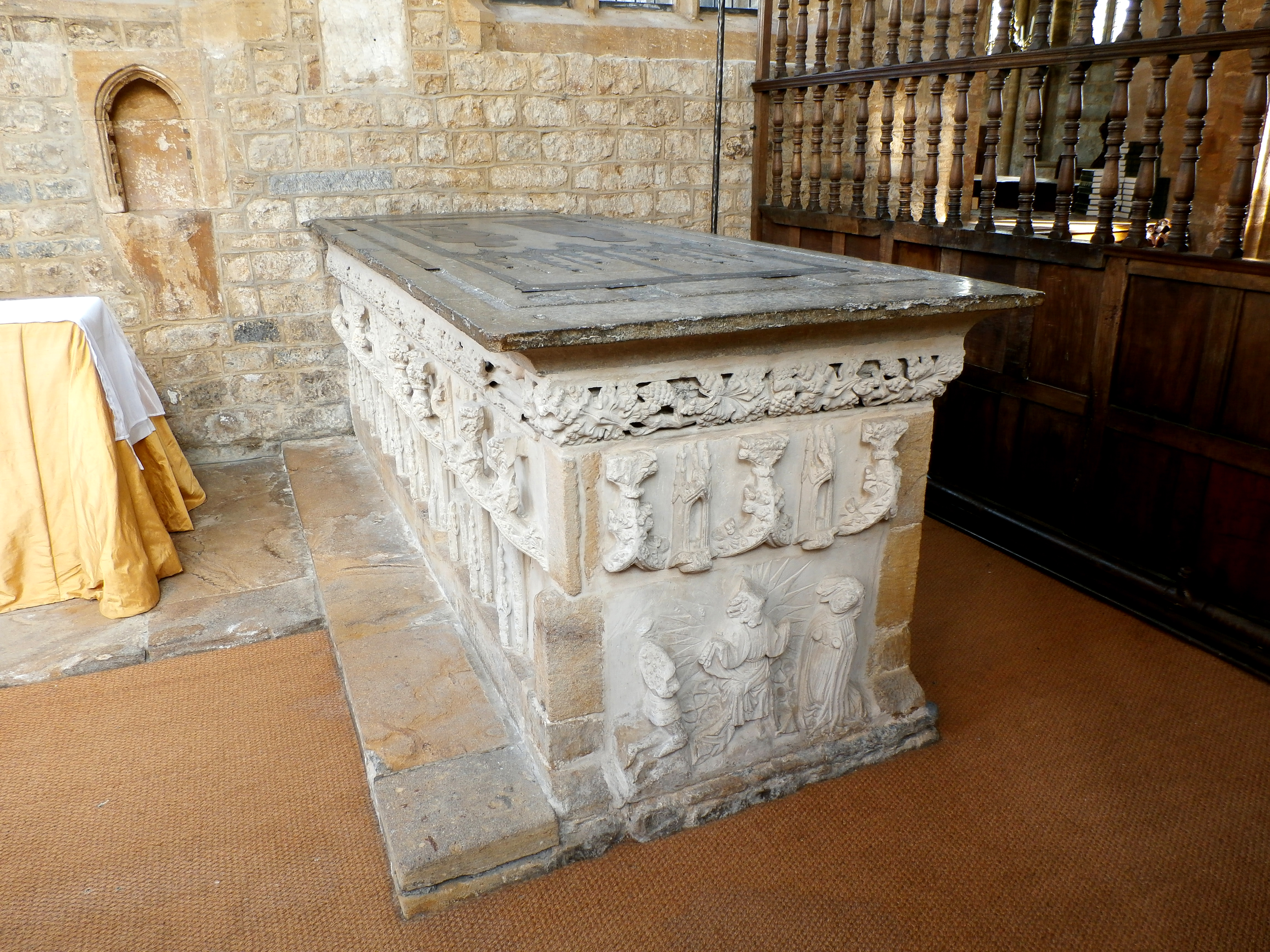
Chest tomb of William Wadham (died 1452), Wadham Chapel (north transept), St Mary's Church, Ilminster, looking eastward

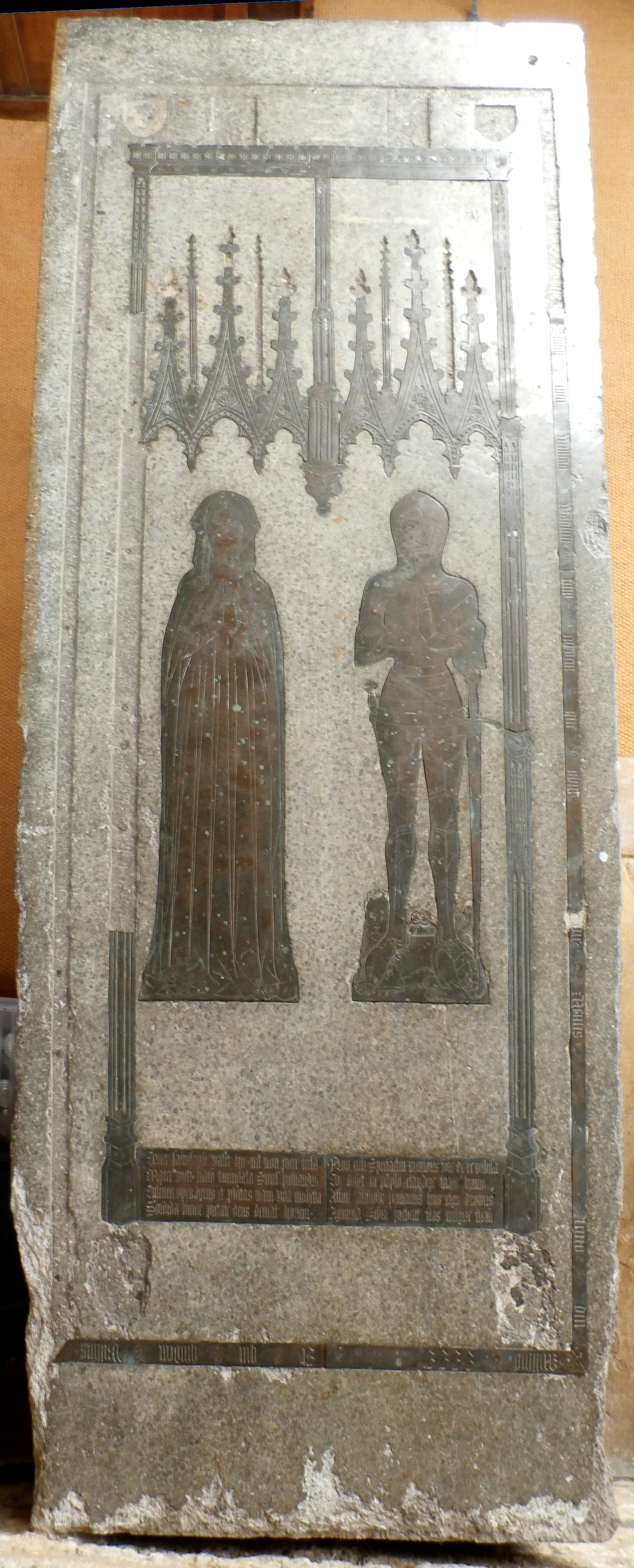
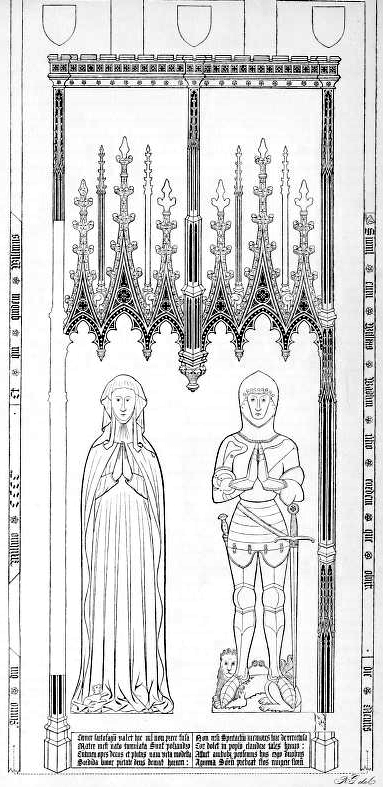
Brasses on ledger stone to William Wadham (died 1452) and his mother Joan Wrothesley, St Mary's Church, Ilminster

William Henry Hamilton Rogers in 1888, wrote as follows regarding the monument to William Wadham (died 1452):

The beautiful north transept of Ilminster church may be assigned, we think, with little doubt, to have been erected by the Wadhams, and in it is their earliest memorial. The structure itself is a fine specimen of Perpendicular, and dates about the middle of the fifteenth century. Two large transomed windows occur on each side, and a larger and very handsome one at the end, having a rose of Decorated character in the head. Outside, the walls are supported by panelled buttresses, surmounted by a cornice of finialed panels with shields, the gable being richly crocketted and pinnacled. Within is a finely-carved open-timbered roof. At the intersection of the cross rises one of those fine towers for which Somersetshire is celebrated. In the centre of the transept is a large high tomb, coeval with the foundation of the structure itself. On the sides under the table is a bold string-course of vine tracery, and below a series of canopied niches, now all void of their former occupants. The whole has been repeatedly whitewashed. The cover is a large slab of polished Purbeck marble, and inlet are the figures of a knight and lady under a beautiful canopy. Above the canopy are the indents of shields, and a ledger line surrounds the whole. The effigies are perfect. The knight in early plate armour, with a lion at his feet; the lady in long gown, mantle, and cover-chief, and a dog with collar and bells at her feet. Below them are eight lines of rhyming Latin. A large portion of the canopy is missing, all the shields, and a considerable length of the ledger line, of which the surviving inscription is as follows:

North side: ... simul cum Willm'o Wadh'm filio eor'dem (cordem?)... que obiit ... die mensis ... East side: Anno D'ni mill'mo CCCC ... et qui quidem Will'mus ...

The month and year were never engraved on the brass, and the badge of the family, a rose, occurs between the words. From the fragment of the inscription remaining it appears probable that the tomb was erected by (a later) Sir John Wadham to his father, William Wadham, and grandmother, Joan Wrothesley, the wife of the Judge, whom the figures may be supposed to represent; the transept being erected about that time, and adopted as their chantry.

== Sources ==
- Rogers, William Henry Hamilton, Memorials of the West, Historical and Descriptive, Collected on the Borderland of Somerset, Dorset and Devon, Exeter, 1888, pp. 147–173, The Founder and Foundress of Wadham

Political offices
Preceded by Robert Burton	High Sheriff of Devon; 1441–1442	Succeeded by Richard Yarde
