= Wadham =

Wadham may refer to:

== Education ==
- Wadham College, Oxford – a constituent college of the University of Oxford
- Wadham College Boat Club – the rowing club of Wadham College, Oxford
- Wadham School – a school for children near Crewkerne, Somerset, England
- Wadham Preparatory School – a primary school for children formerly in Strathfield, New South Wales, Australia

== Places ==
- Wadham Islands – a group of islands near Newfoundland, Canada
  - Offer Wadham Lighthouse

== Companies ==
- Wadham's Oil and Grease Company of Milwaukee

== See also ==
- Wadhams, Kimball Township, Michigan
- Wadhams, Westport, New York
- People with the surname Wadham or Wadhams
- People of the name Wadham Wyndham
