= Nicholas Wadham =

Nicholas Wadham may refer to:

- Nicholas Wadham (1531–1609), co-founder of Wadham College, Oxford
- Nicholas Wadham (1472–1542), English landowner, courtier and politician
