= Robert Hill (died 1426) =

Member of the Parliament of England

Sir Robert I Hill (died before 1426), sometimes written Hull, was an English politician and judge from the West Country.

== Origins ==
Born before 1350, the son of Robert Hill, a lawyer, he made his home at Shilstone in the parish of Modbury in Devon. He is often confused with another Robert Hill (died 1423), who lived at Spaxton in Somerset and was the son of Sir John Hill (died 1408), a Justice of the King's Bench.

== Career ==
He initially entered politics, sitting as MP in the Parliament of England for various Devon constituencies. In 1372 he represented both Dartmouth and Tavistock; then Plympton in 1373, in both Parliaments of 1377, and in 1380; and finally in 1379 Exeter.

Thereafter he followed his father in a legal career, becoming one of the counsel retained by Edward Courtenay, Earl of Devon, in 1384, a member of the Inner Temple, and in 1388 a serjeant-at-law. By 1399 he was a King's Serjeant, and was called on for a so-called loan of 100 pounds to aid in the King's wars against the Welsh and the Scots. In 1408 he was created a Justice of the Common Pleas, remaining in post for the rest of his life. Though he acted as chief justice following the death of Edward Norton, he was never formally appointed.

In 1415 he was one of the judges in the Southampton Plot treason trial, in which Richard of Conisburgh, 3rd Earl of Cambridge, Henry Scrope, 3rd Baron Scrope of Masham, and Sir Thomas Grey were condemned and beheaded. In 1417 he was appointed to hold sessions in Wales and in 1422 was chief justice of the Isle of Ely.

His salary was last paid at Easter 1423 and he died shortly after, maybe in 1425.

== Family ==
He married Isabella Wadham, sometimes called Elizabeth, daughter of Sir John Wadham, of Edge, Justice of the Common Pleas from 1388 to 1397, and his wife Joan Wrottesley of Blore Hall.

Their children included his heir Robert II Hill, born about 1392, who was High Sheriff of Devon in 1428. He married Margaret de Champernon, daughter of Sir Richard Champernon, Sheriff of Devon and Lady Katherine d'Aubeney.

By 1419 Isabel had died and he had become the fourth husband of Joan, daughter and only legitimate heir of Sir Otto II Bodrugan, High Sheriff of Cornwall in 1381, who survived him and died in April 1428. She was the granddaughter of Sir Otto I Bodrugan, the half-sister of William I Bodrugan and the mother of William II Bodrugan.
