= John Wadham =

Member of the Parliament of England

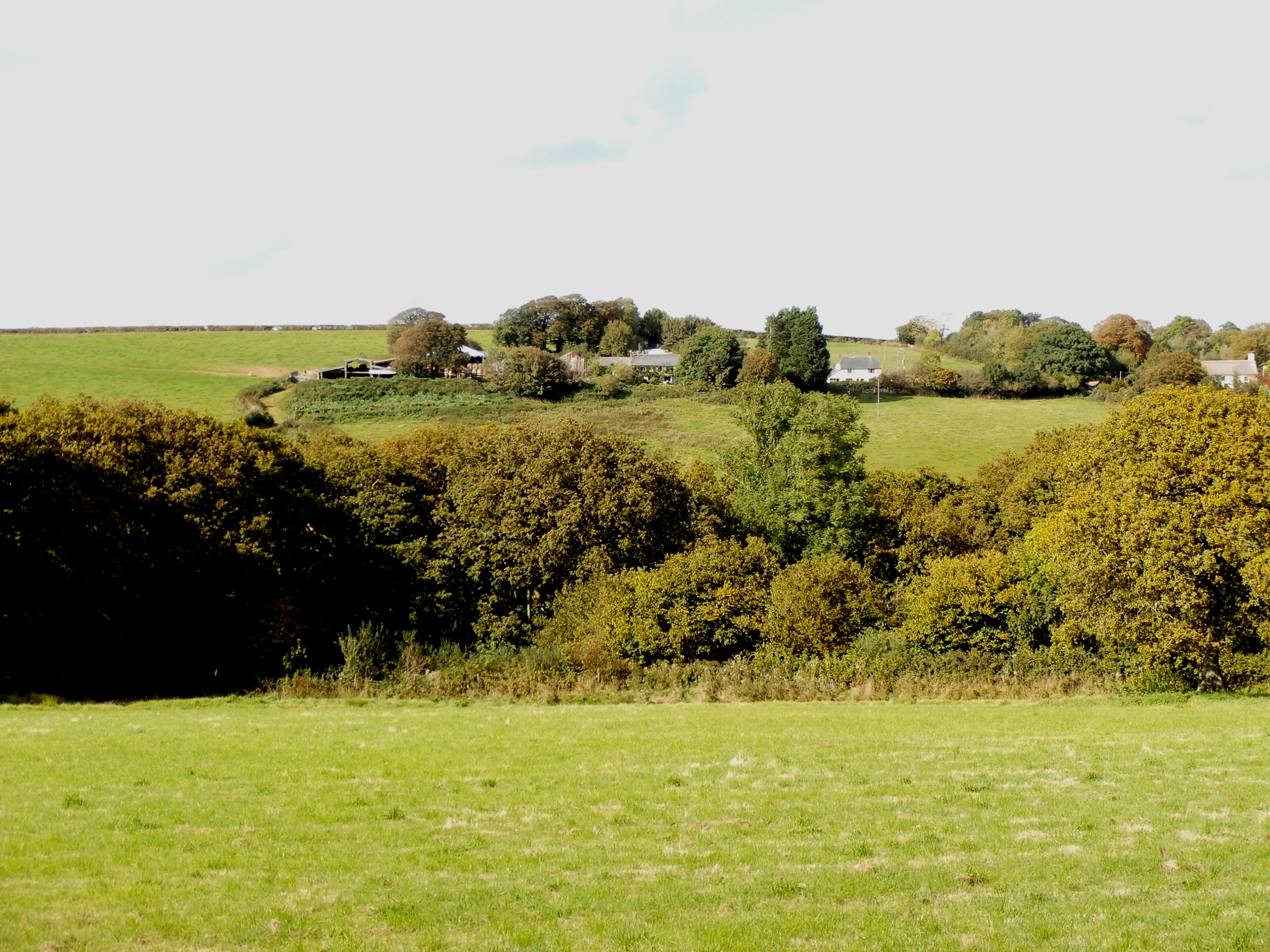
Wadham, panorama viewed from south

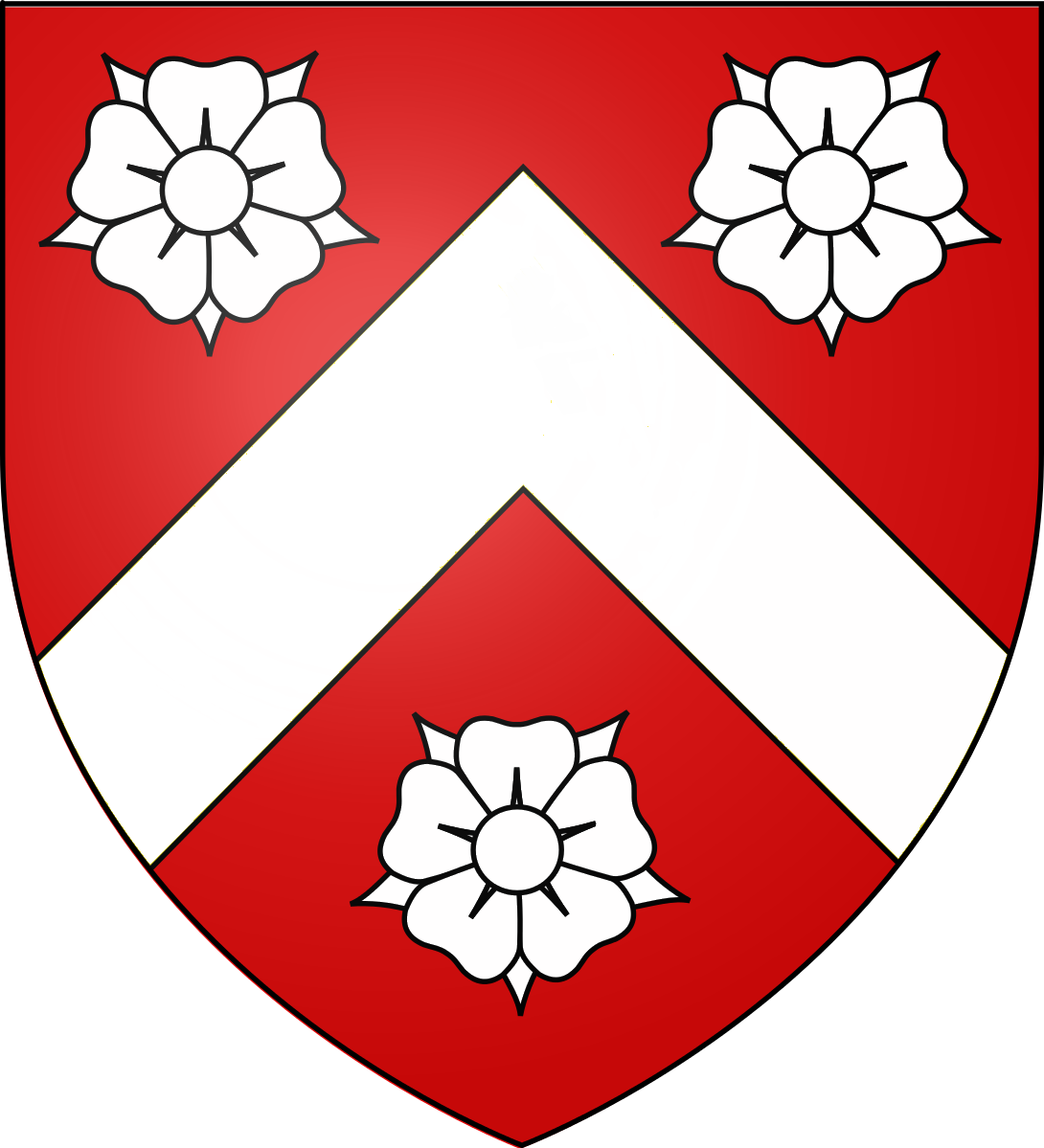
Arms of Wadham: Gules, a chevron between three roses argent

Sir John Wadham (c. 1344 – 1412) was a Justice of the Common Pleas from 1389 to 1398, during the reign of King Richard II (1377–1399), selected by the king as an assertion of his right to rule by the advice of men appointed of his own choice, and one of the many Devonians of the period described by Thomas Fuller in his Worthies of England, as seemingly "innated with a genius to study law".

He was MP for Exeter in 1379, and after Richard II was deposed by his cousin Henry Bolingbroke, who became King Henry IV (1399–1413), Wadham was 'discharged at his own request' from being an assize judge. He became a Member of Parliament for Devon in 1401 as a knight of the shire with Sir Philip Courtenay of Powderham, a son of Hugh de Courtenay, 2nd/10th Earl of Devon.

John Wadham 'the judge' was one of John Prince's Worthies of Devon: "All I have met with him further, is this encomium," says the Devonshire biographer, "that being free of speech, he mingled it well with discretion; so that he never touched any man how mean so ever out of order, either for sport or spight; but with alacrity of spirit and soundness of understanding managed all his proceedings."

Prince points out that in this period there were five serjeants-at-law—John Cary, John Hill, Robert Hill of Shilston (Justice of the Common Pleas 1408–1423), William Hankford and John Wadham, all natives of Devon.

== Origins and career ==
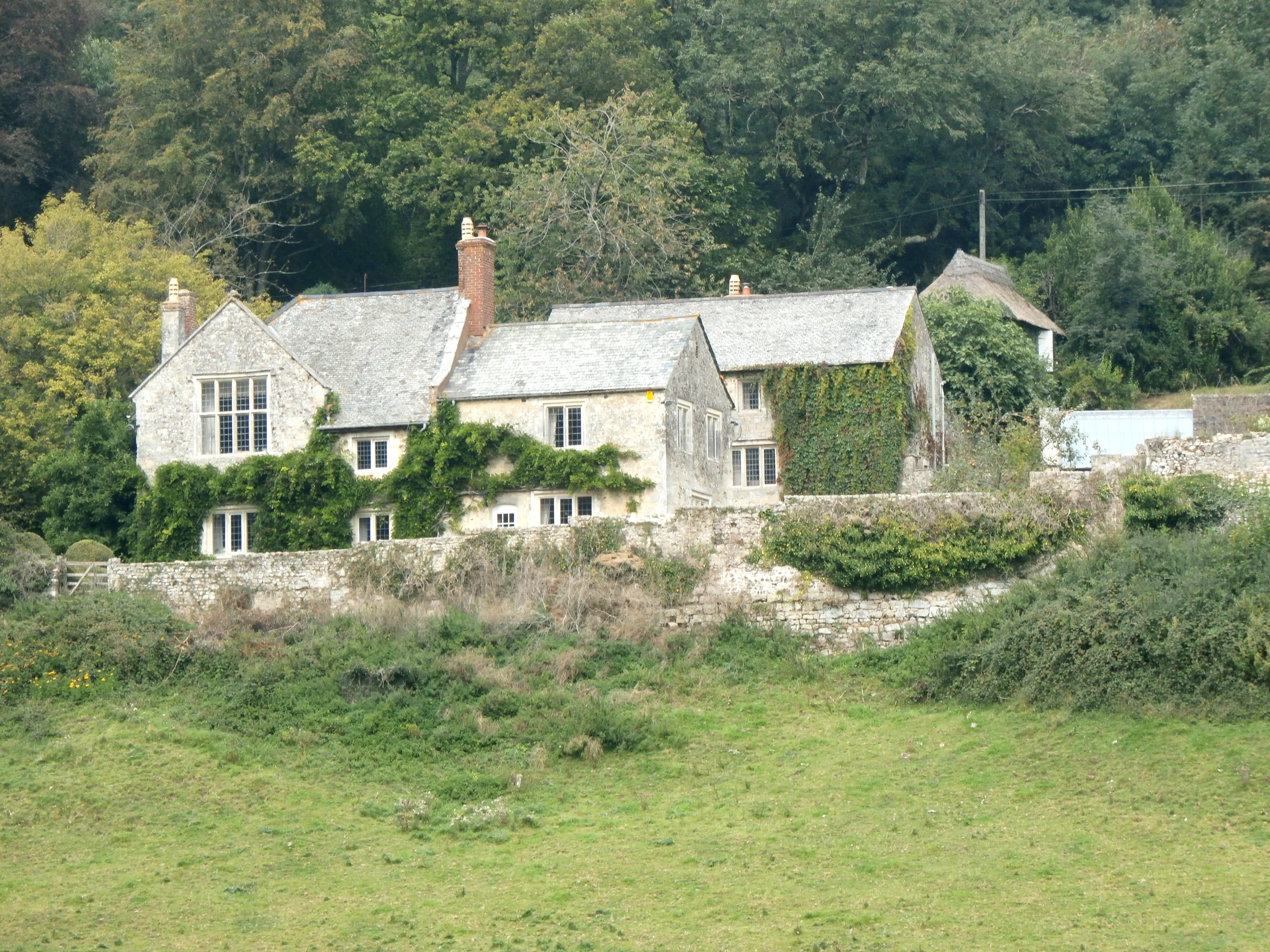
Edge Barton, south front

William Pole and John Prince both stated him to be the son of another Sir John Wadham of Edge in the parish of Branscombe, Devon, And the manor of Edge in Branscombe is known to be his ancestral home, making this relationship very likely. His modern History of Parliament biographer, however, suggests he may have been the son, rather than the nephew, perhaps, of Gilbert Wadham (c.1320–1383) of Wadham, who in 1383 quitclaimed to him a rent in the manor of Wadham (or Wadeham) in the parish of Knowstone, between Exmoor and South Molton, from which the family originally took their name, and where, according to Sir William Pole, they had lived from at least the reign of King Edward I (1272–1307).

The deed was witnessed by Sir John's lifelong friend and colleague Sir William Hankford, Chief Justice of the King's Bench from 1413 to 1423. The biographer adds: "It is curious that the origins of a man of such distinction as Wadham should have been lost . . . . If his origins are obscure, so too are the beginnings of his career as a lawyer. Where he received his education is not known." In his will, dated 12 March 1411, he includes money to be expended on "prayers for the soul of Richard Brankescombe", Sheriff of Devon from 1359 to 1361, who may have been an early mentor, and he is first recorded in 1367 as an attorney at Westminster.

In 1383, he was made Serjeant-at-Law and in 1384 he was given a livery by Edward de Courtenay, 3rd Earl of Devon for his services as legal counsel. In 1387, only three years after being made a judge, he was made King's Serjeant. "He had a large practice," writes Prince "and thereby made a great addition to his estates," adding to both his ancestral estate at Wadham and at Edge, Branscombe in Devon where the family made their home during the reign of King Edward III (1327–1377).

He also purchased land and messuages elsewhere in Somerset, Gloucestershire, Dorset, and Devon. In 1386, he purchased the manor of Silverton from Cecily de Beauchamp from whom he also bought land where, in about 1400, he built a moated and fortified manor house at Merryfield, Ilton in Somerset, which became the family's principal home. In 1403, he bought the manor of Lustleigh on Dartmoor, which stayed in the Wadham family for the next two hundred years, as did Edge in Branscombe where he bought over three hundred acres of land.

When, in May 1398, he was discharged from the bench he received the grant of a pension from the assizes of Somerset and Dorset 'for good service'. The inquisitio post mortem in 1413 valued his holdings at £115 per annum.

== Marriage and children ==
He married first, according to his will, a certain Maud, with whom he had a son. Before 1385, he married Joan Wrottesley, who may have been a descendant of Sir William Wrottesley of Blore and Joan Bassett of Drayton Bassett, both in Staffordshire.

John Wadham had eight children:

- Robert Wadham, who died without progeny
- Sir William Wadham, Sheriff of Devon in 1442, eldest surviving son and heir of Merryfield and Edge, who lies buried with his mother in a beautiful altar tomb in the transept known as the 'Wadham aisle', a chantry dedicated to St Katherine, at the Church of St Mary, Ilminster, Somerset
- John Wadham, who married Elizabeth Popham, daughter of Sir Stephen Popham who was a Member of Parliament for Hampshire 5 times.
- Walter Wadham, Rector of St Stephen in Branell, Cornwall
- Thomas Wadham, of Redworthy in Ashreigney
- Margery Wadham, who married Sir John Stourton, 1st Baron Stourton; ancestors to queen consort Jane Seymour, King Edward VI and the Seymour Dukes of Somerset
- Joan Wadham
- Isabella Wadham, sometimes called 'Elizabeth', who married Sir Robert Hill, of Shilston near Modbury, who was Justice of the Common Pleas from 1408 to 1423. Their eldest son, Robert Hill of Shilston, married Margaret Champernowne (1396–1434) of Modbury and was Sheriff of Devon in 1428.
