= St Mary's Church, Ilminster =

Church in Somerset, England

Church of St Mary
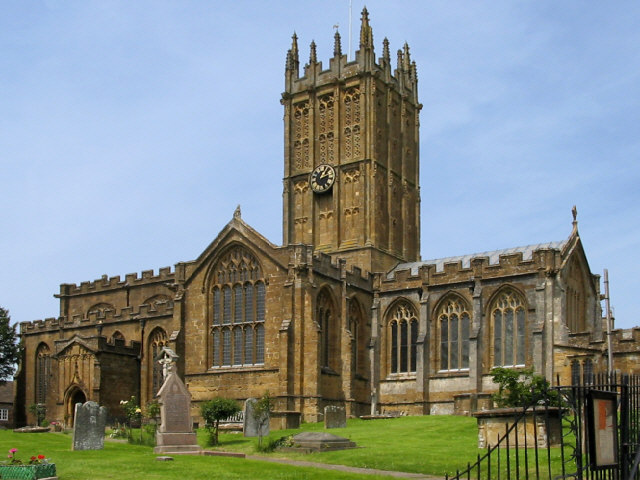

- Location within Somerset
- 50°55′38″N 2°54′41″W
- Location: Ilminster, Somerset, England

History
- Built: 15th century

Listed Building – Grade I
- Official name: Parish Church of St Mary
- Designated: 23 September 1950
- Reference no.: 1208692

The Church of St Mary in Ilminster, Somerset, England, dates from the 15th century and has been designated as a Grade I listed building.

== History ==
Ilminster takes its name from the River Isle and its large church of St Mary, which is known as The Minster. The 15th-century Hamstone building was refurbished in 1825 by William Burgess and the chancel restored in 1883. Further restoration took place in 1887–1889 and 1902.

Among the principal features are the Wadham tombs; those of Sir William Wadham of Merryfield and Edge and of his mother, dated 1452, and Nicholas and Dorothy Wadham, 1609 and 1618, co-founders of Wadham College, Oxford.

The tower, which was built in the first quarter of the 16th century, rises two storeys above the nave. It has three bays, with a stair turret to the north-west corner. The bays are articulated by slender buttresses with crocketed finials above the castellated parapet. Each bay on both stages contains a tall two-light mullioned-and-transomed window with tracery. The lights to the top are filled with pierced stonework; those to the base are solid. The stair turret has string courses coinciding with those on the tower, and a spirelet with a weathervane.

== Organ ==
The pipe organ has two manuals and pedals, with 19 speaking stops. A specification of the organ can be found in the National Pipe Organ Register. Albert Ham was organist and choirmaster at the church from 1877 to 1892.

== Bells ==
The tower contains a peal of 8 bells. It contains a ring of 8 bells, with the 4th and 6th of the ring dating from 1611 and 1614 respectively (cast by George Purdue), the 5th dating from 1732 cast by Thomas I. Bilbie, and the tenor from 1790 cast by William Bilbie of the Bilbie family.

== See also ==
- List of Grade I listed buildings in South Somerset
- List of towers in Somerset
- List of ecclesiastical parishes in the Diocese of Bath and Wells
