= Edge, Branscombe =

Historic estate in Devon, England

Edge, (originally, Egge), is an ancient and historic house in the parish of Branscombe, Devon, England and is today known as Edge Barton Manor. The surviving house is grade II* listed and sits on the steep, south-facing side of a wooded valley, or combe. The building was not in origin a manor house, but was one of the first stone-built houses in "Branescombe", on a villein holding called La Regge. It is one of the oldest continuously inhabited houses in England, and is constructed from the local Beer stone.

== Description ==
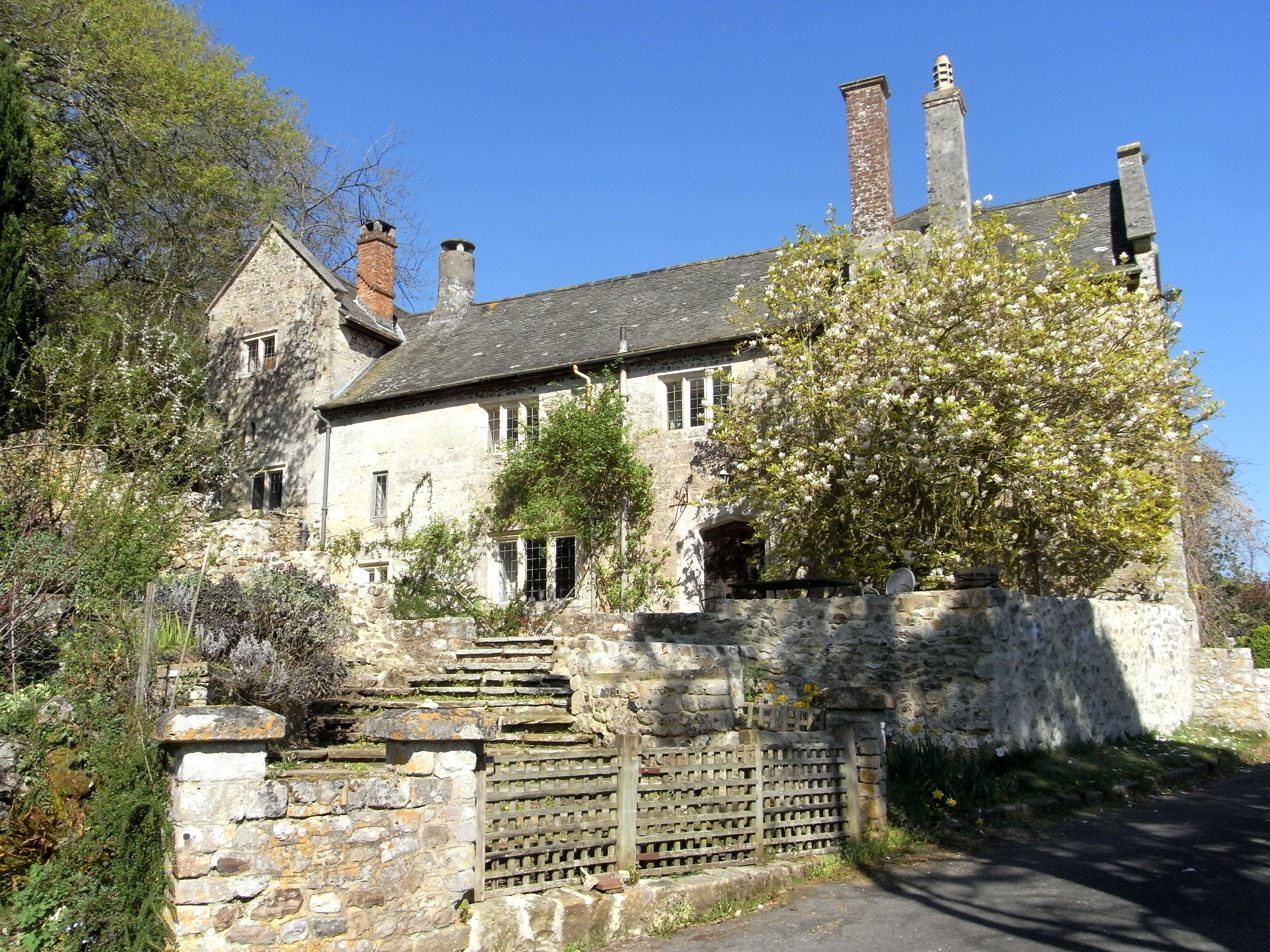
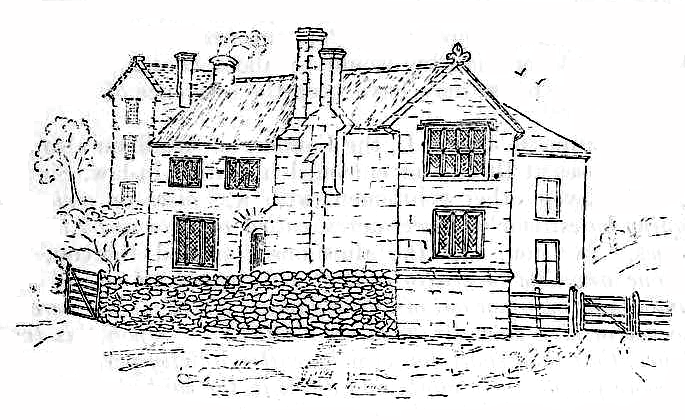
Edge Barton, Branscombe, view from south-west; right: 1888 drawing

The existing building is U-shaped and may originally have been built around a courtyard. Only a short section of the original dry moat survives. An early circular stone staircase tower is contained within the angle of the north wing to give access to a second floor that was created by the addition of a raised ceiling to the great hall. The stone splay of an upstairs window shows ancient, graffiti-incised drawings of sailing ships that are thought to represent those of the Spanish Armada that was becalmed offshore near Branscombe in 1588.

=== Chapel ===
A chapel attached to the house dates from the end of the thirteenth or early fourteenth century. Much of the rest of the house's architecture is from the fifteenth and sixteenth centuries.

The chapel, thought to have been built by Walter Branscombe, Bishop of Exeter from 1258 to 1280, occupied the present south wing, where a large rose window containing four cusped trefoils originally set within the outer gable of the west wall survives on what is now an internal wall, hidden behind a later chimney stack in the attic. In 1822, Samuel Lysons described the chapel as being in a poor state of repair and desecrated. An ancient stone piscina has also survived; this was reset into a wall in the hall.

== Descent of the manor ==
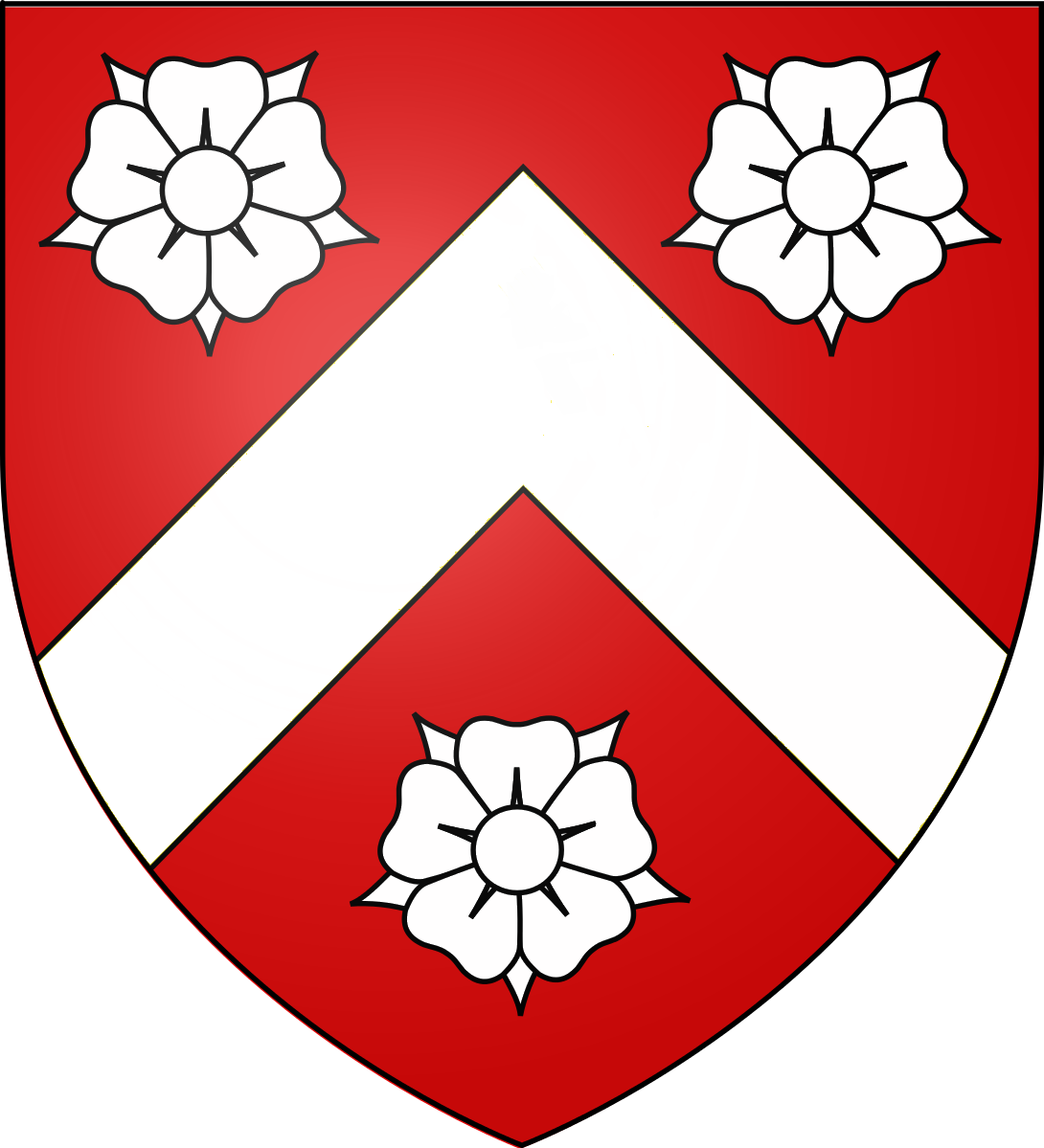
Arms of Wadham: Gules, a chevron between three roses argent

Edge was the home of the Branscombe family from the 11th to the 13th centuries, before passing to the Wadham family, who held it until the late 16th century. From 1618 through the 20th century, it was occupied by tenant farmers. The majority of the manor house dates from the 15th and 16th centuries, with some parts as much as two centuries older. It has since passed through a series of owners.

=== Wadham ===
Historically, the manor of Branscombe belonged to the See of Exeter, but during the reign of King Edward III (1327–1377) the estate of Edge was acquired by the de Wadham family who took their name from the manor of Wadham, Knowstone in north Devon and held Edge for eight generations, eventually moving their principal residence to Merryfield, Ilton in Somerset around 1400, after which point Edge seems to have been used as the family’s dower house.

- John I Wadham
- John II Wadham (c. 1344 – 1412)
- William Wadham (died 1452) (c. 1386 – 1452)
- John III Wadham (1405–1476)
- John IV Wadham (died 1502)
- Nicholas I Wadham (by 1472 – 1542)
- John V Wadham (before 1510 – 1578)
- Nicholas II Wadham (1531-1609)
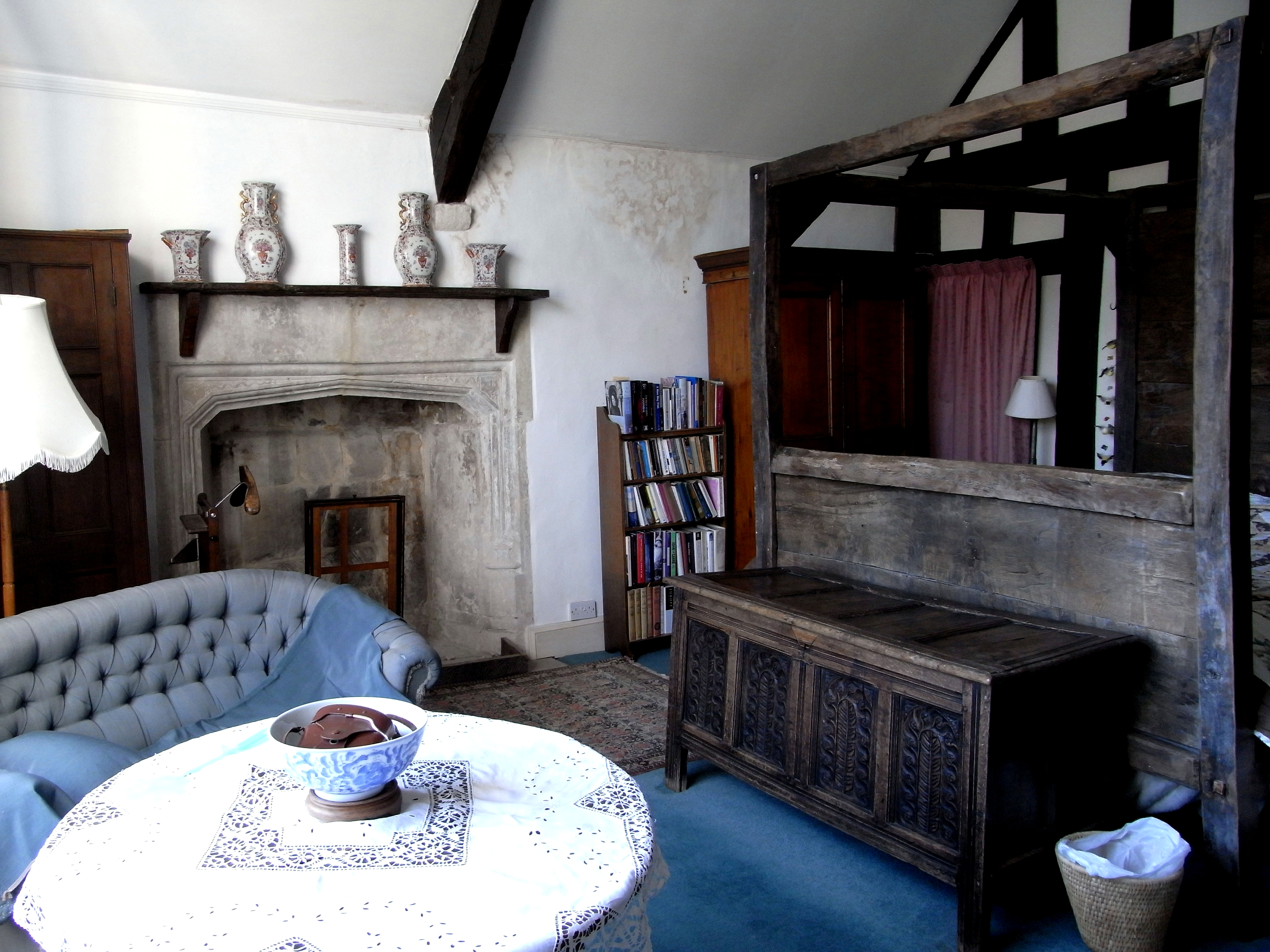
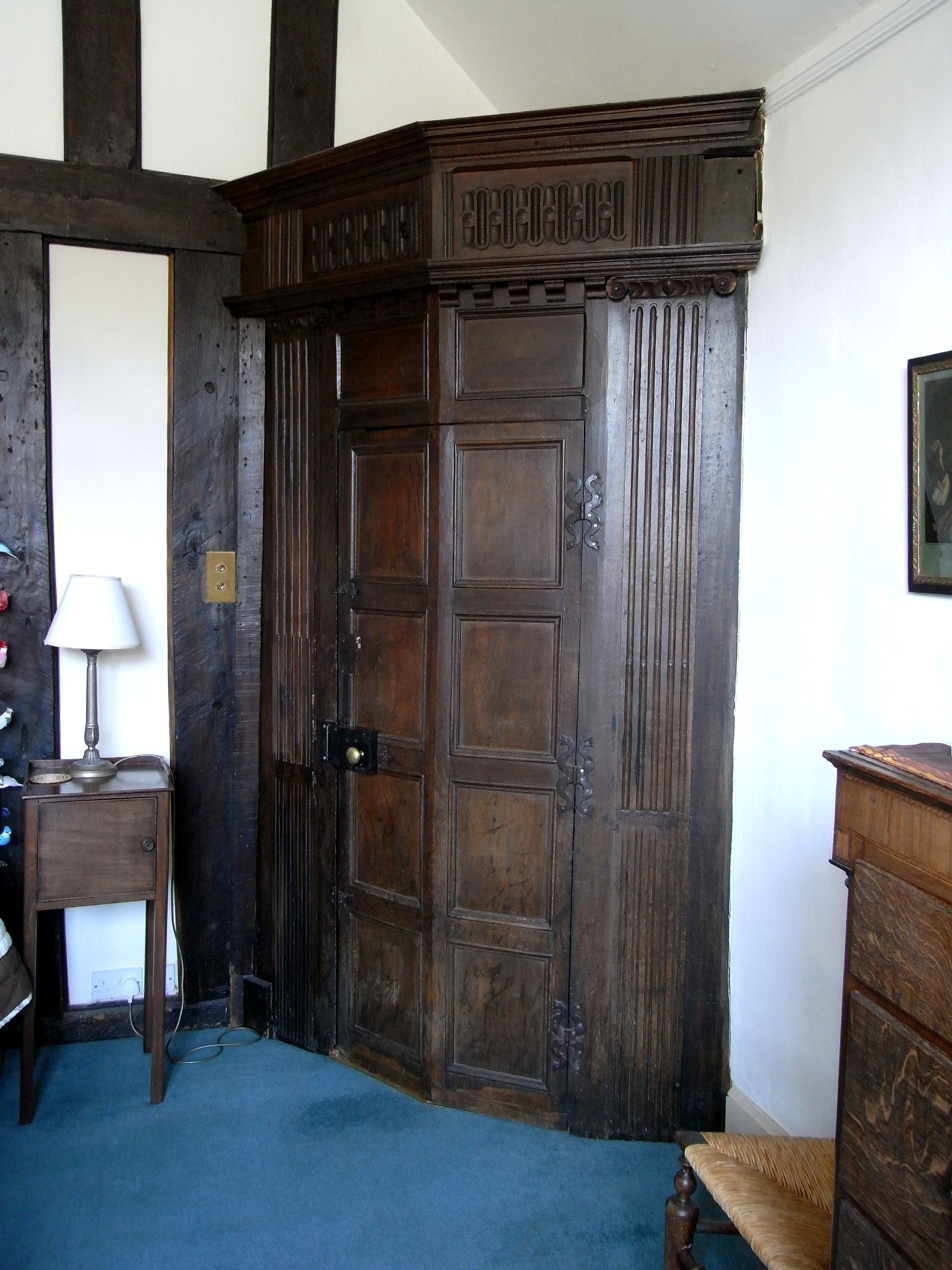
Dorothy Wadham's bedroom, Edge Barton

In 1618 on the death of Dorothy Petre (1534/5- 1618), widow of Nicholas Wadham, Edge and his other possessions passed to the descendants of his three sisters:

- Joan Wadham (1533-1603), who had married firstly Sir Giles Strangways (1528–1562) of Melbury House, in Dorset, and secondly Sir John Young (died 1589) of The Great House, Bristol.
- Margaret Wadham, who married Nicholas Martyn (c. 1550 – 1595) of Athelhampton Hall, Dorset.
- Florence Wadham (1538-1596), who married Sir John Wyndham (died 1572) of Orchard Wyndham in Somerset.

=== Wyndham/Fox-Strangways ===
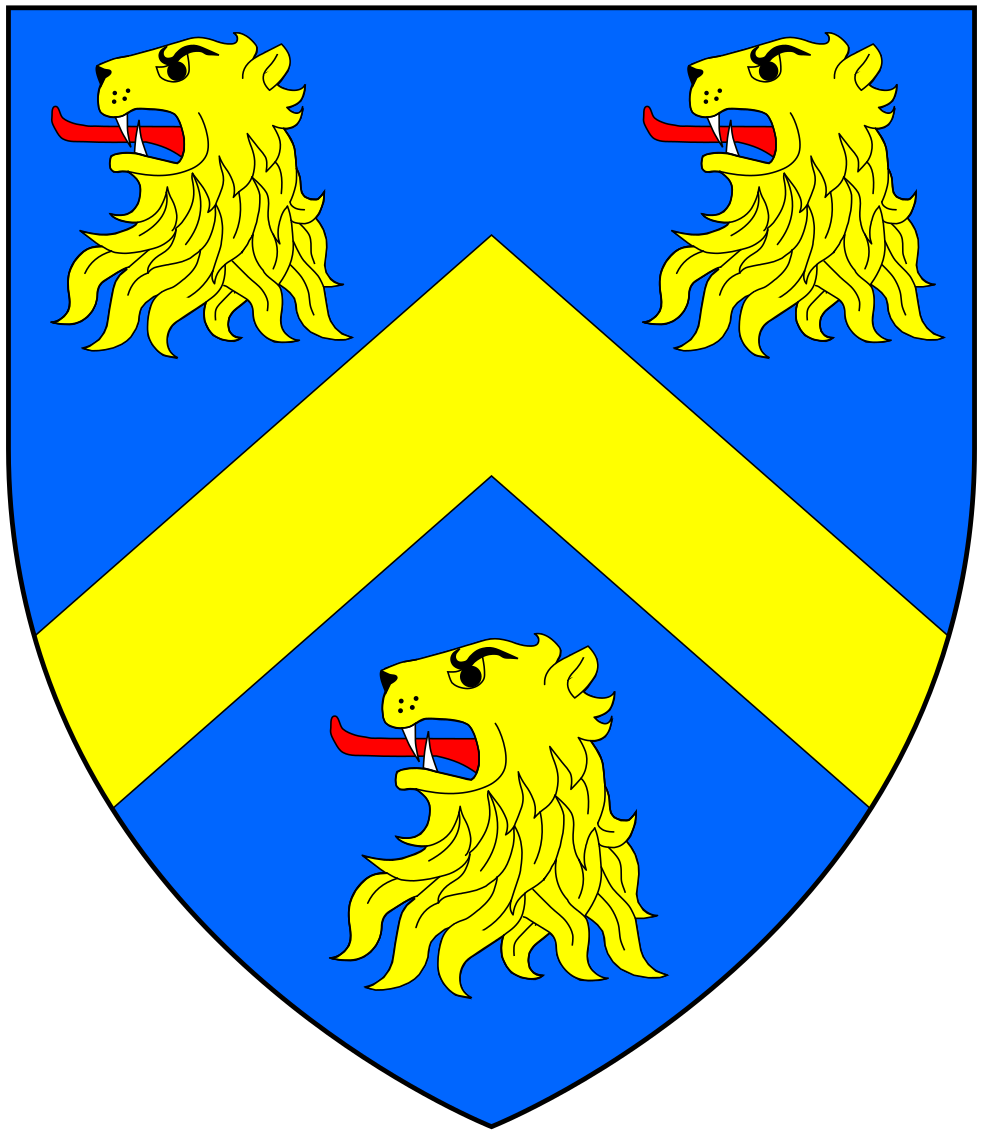
Arms of Wyndham: Azure, a chevron between three lion's heads erased or

Following the death of Dorothy Wadham in 1618, Edge passed into the families of the sisters and co-heiresses (at least in their issue) of Nicholas Wadham; namely, the Martyns of Athelhampton, Dorset, the Wyndhams of Orchard Wyndham, Somerset, later Earls of Egremont at Petworth House in Sussex, and the Strangways of Melbury House, Dorset, later, as Fox-Strangways, Earls of Ilchester, who retained co-ownership until 1933 and in the interval let Edge to a series of tenant farmers.

==== Tenants ====
Edge was at one point occupied as tenants by the Langdons, of Chard in Somerset, and was described in the eighteenth century as "derelict in appearance".

Early in the twentieth century it was tenanted by a Mr. Richards, of Sidmouth, who was born in Branscombe.

=== 20th century ===
Edge was purchased in 1933 by Captain Frank Masters, an architect. The house was in a decayed state and with the former chapel being used as a dairy. He began extensive renovations in 1935, but did not live to complete the work. The renovations begun by Captain Masters were completed by Robert Blackburn, an aeronautical engineer. Peter de Savary owned the property (via Slatecroft Properties) for a short time and sought to run it as an activity centre for "25-30 boys from overseas". Subsequent owner Leese did extensive modernisation and decorations. The Neuman family lived at Edge, and built the current conservatory for which there was placed a 15th century French gargoyle. The family did extensive landscape work to the gardens, restoration to the reception room on the ground floor and re-thatched the barn.

In 1996, Edge was acquired by retired businessman Michael Silvanus Robinson ( Silvan Robinson) CBE and his wife June, (née Wood), a former Conservative mayor of the London Borough of Richmond upon Thames. The Robinsons established a link with Wadham College and in June 2010, to mark the 400th anniversary of the college's founding they entertained Sir Neil Chalmers, Warden of Wadham College and a number of the Fellows at Edge.

== Gallery ==
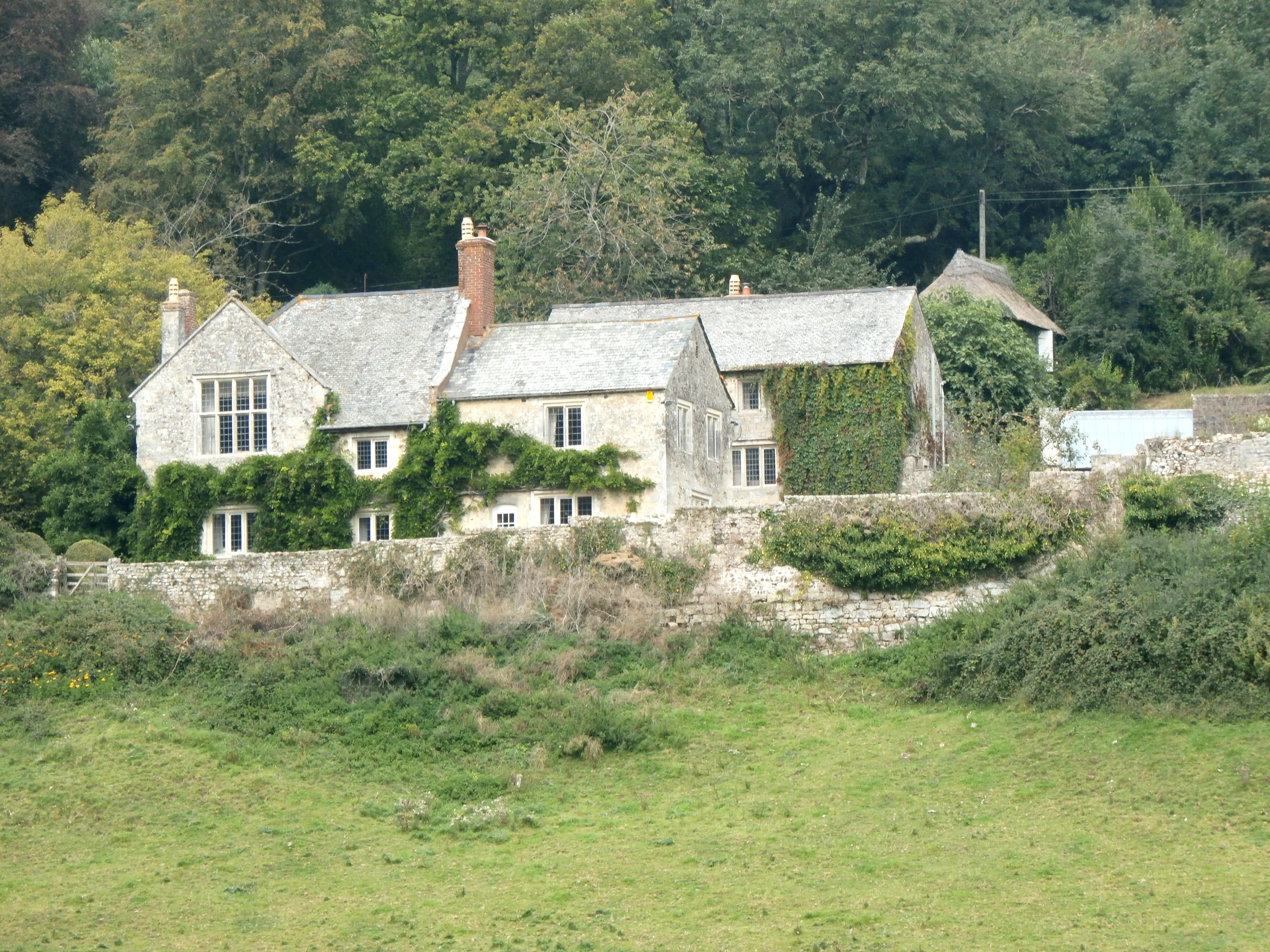
Edge Barton, south front

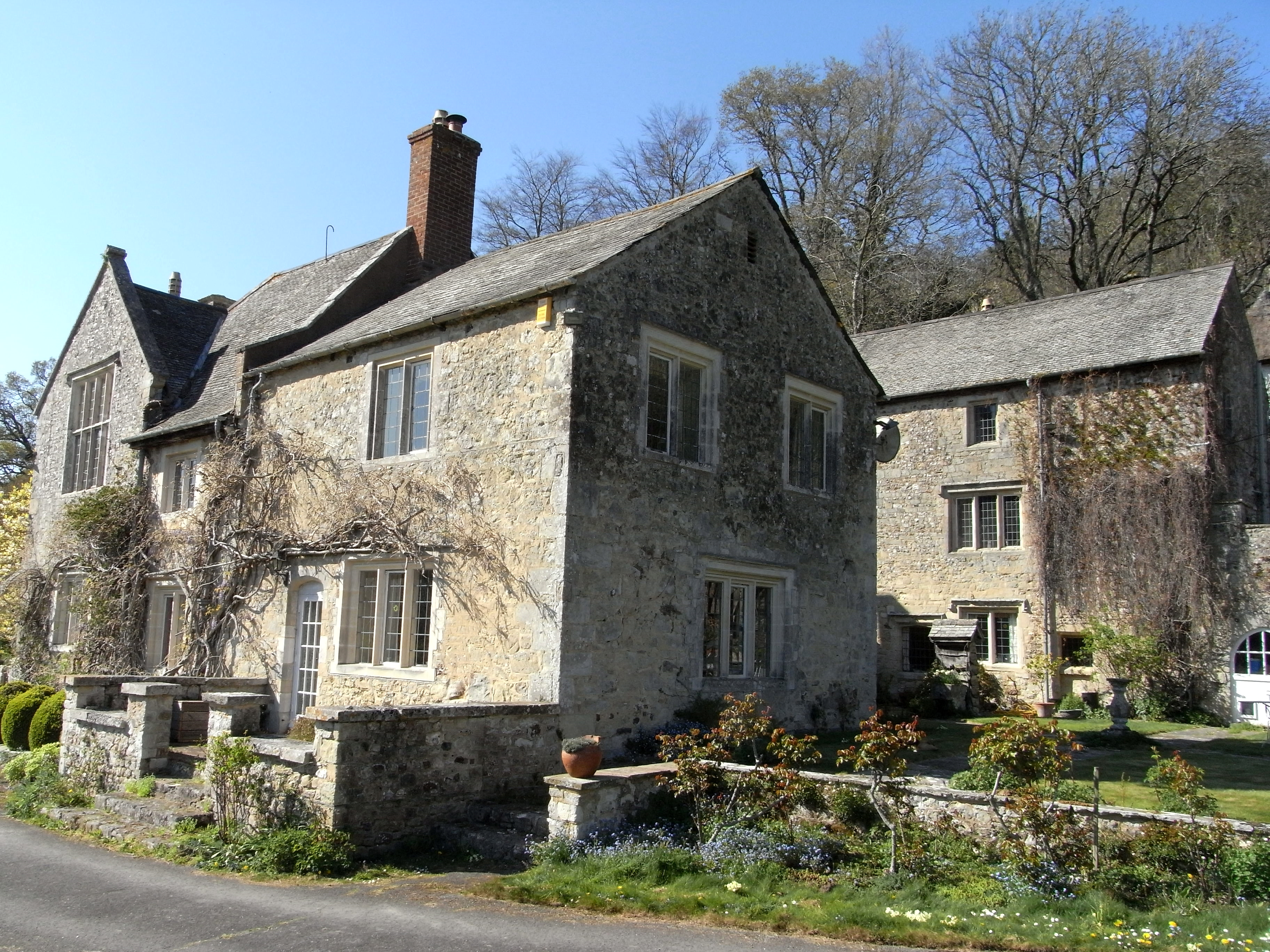
Edge Barton, viewed from south-east

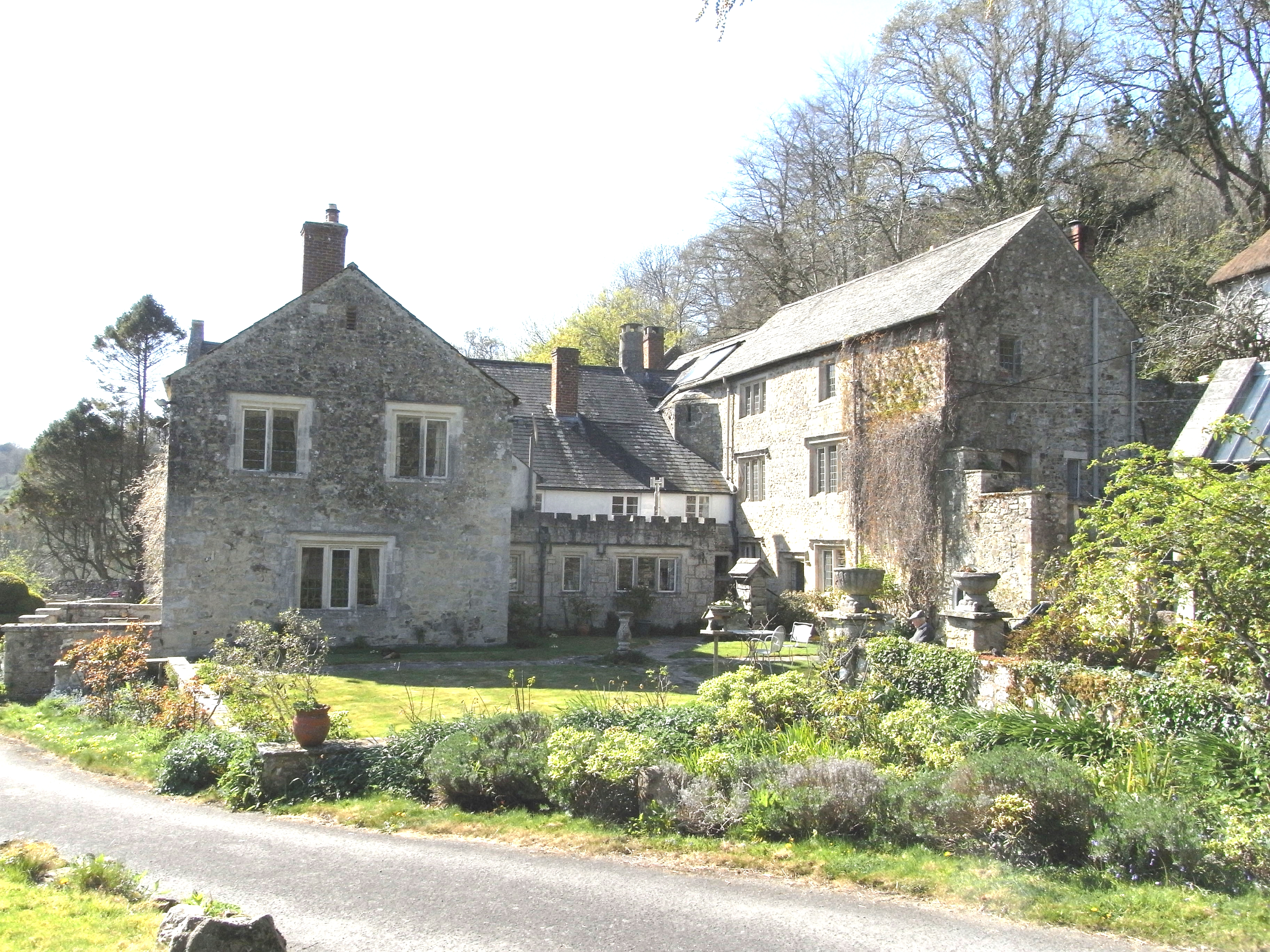
Edge Barton, viewed from east. The top of the circular staircase tower is visible in the corner of the north and west wings (right)

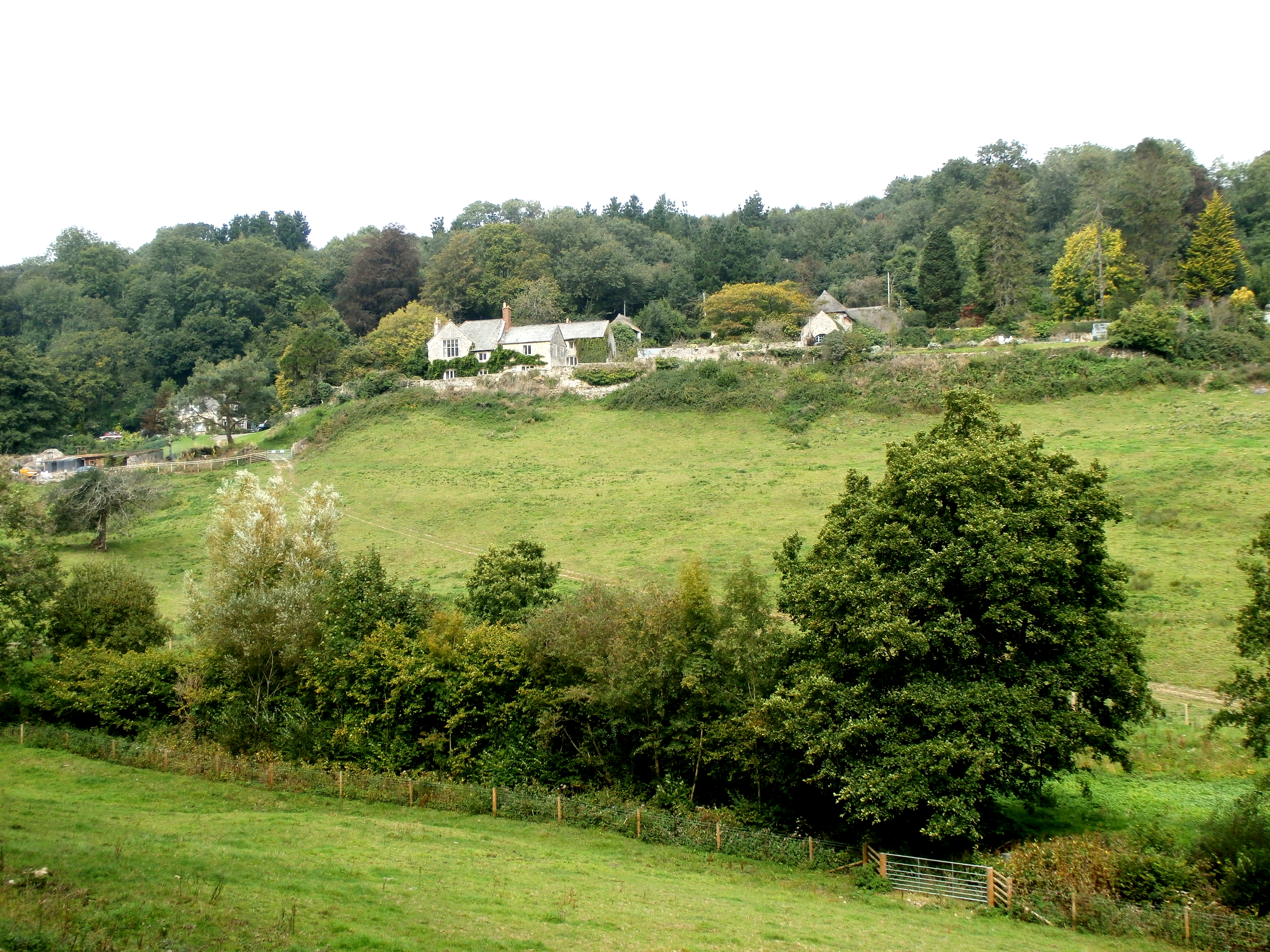
Edge Barton, setting

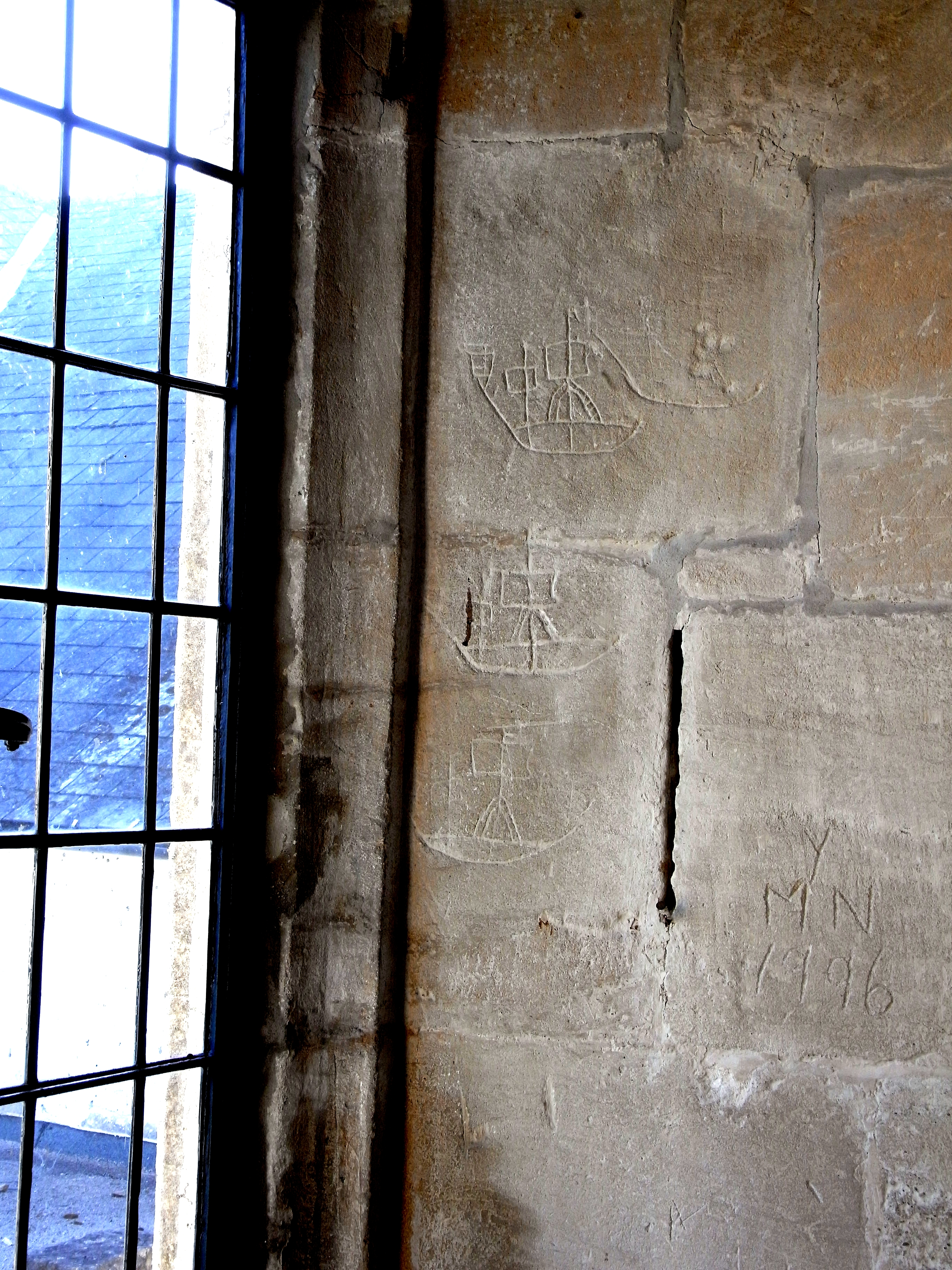
Ancient graffiti featuring sailing boats, inscribed on stone window splay in an upper floor room, Edge Barton

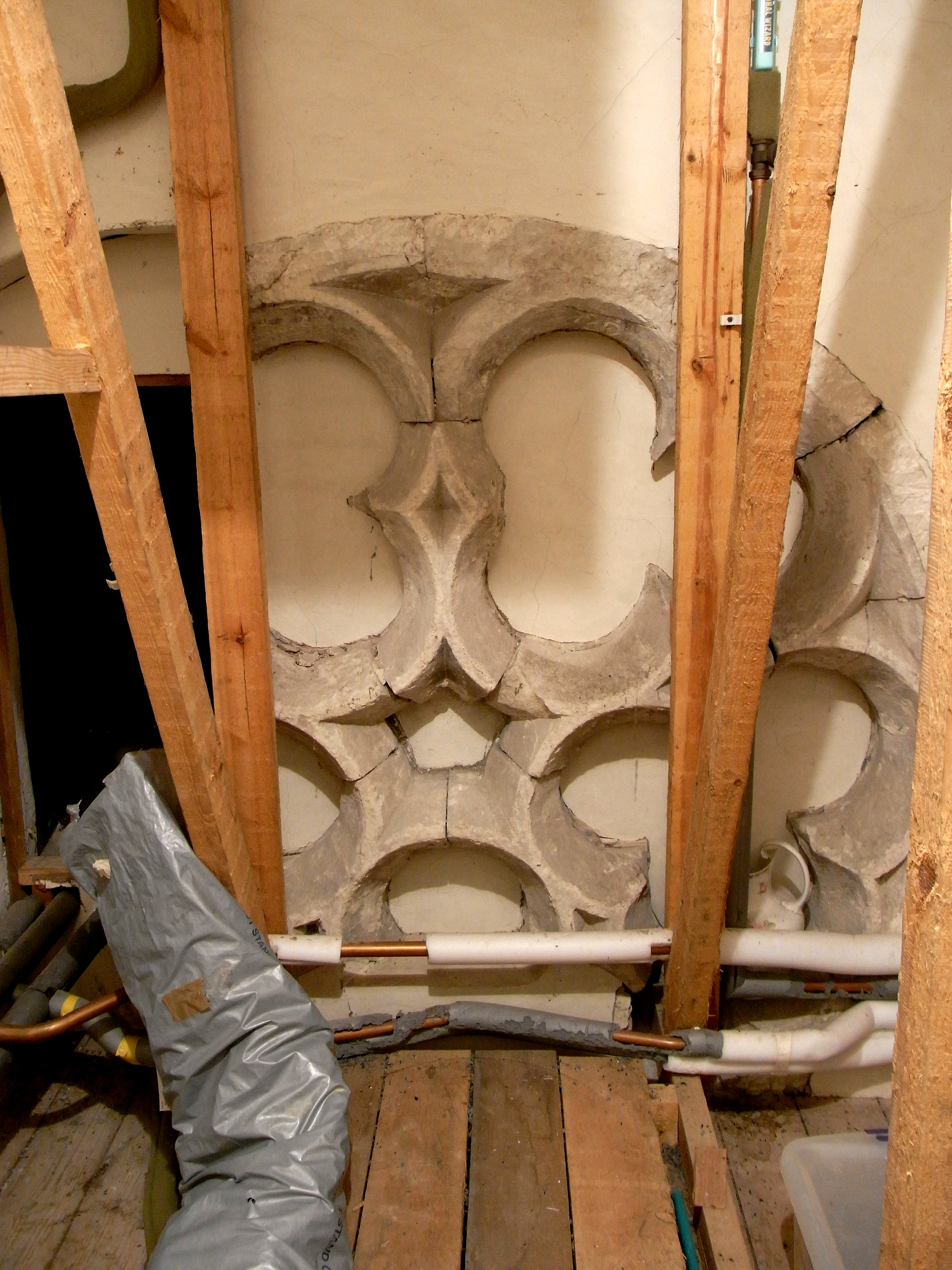
Remains of late C13-early C14 rose window, Edge Barton, featuring a trefoil arch. The wall is thought to have formed the west wall of a late C13-early C14 chapel

== Sources ==
- Rogers, William Henry Hamilton, Memorials of the West, Historical and Descriptive, Collected on the Borderland of Somerset, Dorset and Devon, Exeter, 1888, pp. 147–173, The Founder and Foundress of Wadham.
- Branscombe Parish: Some Notable Houses (www.branscombe.net)
