= Merryfield =

Historic estate in Somerset, England

Coordinates: 50.9558°N 2.9413°W

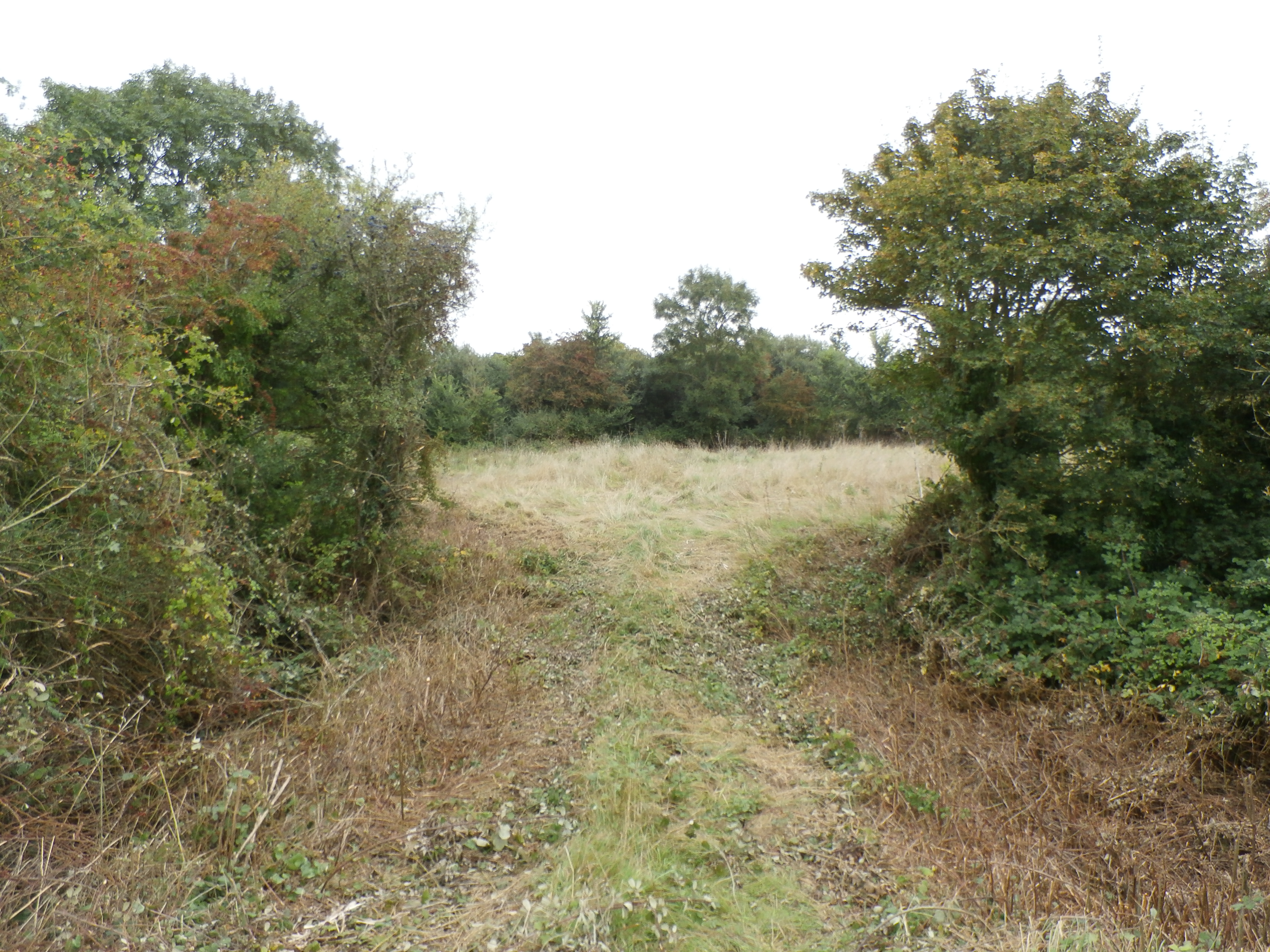
View from causeway into south side of rectangular site of demolished Merryfield House, Ilton, with moat to left and right

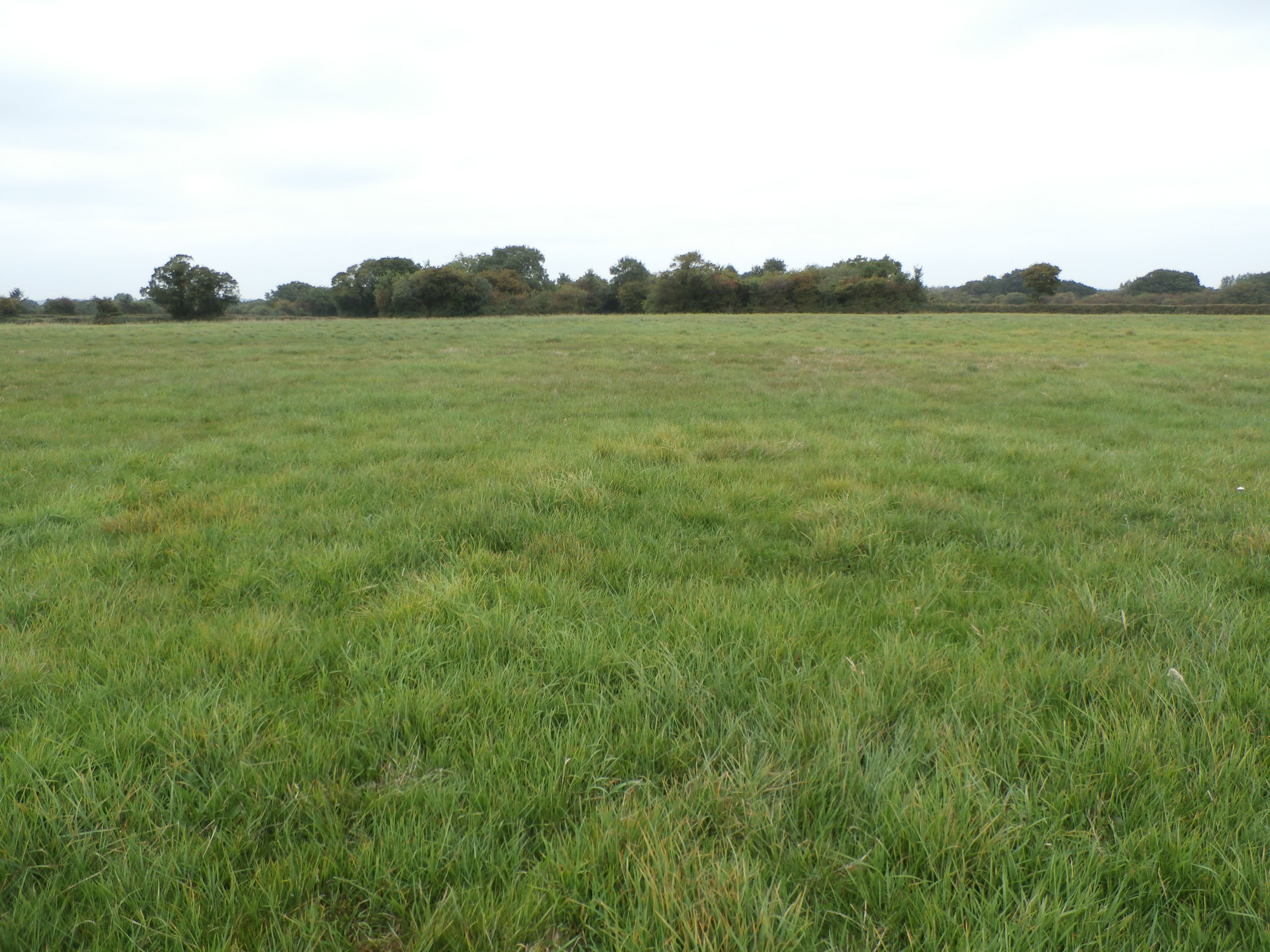
Site of Merryfield House, now a rectangular site surrounded by trees (centre), viewed from south. The width of the site on the south (entrance) side, as determined by the length of the moat, is about 50 metres

Merryfield (alias Merrifield, Murefeld, Merefeld, Muryfield, Merifield, Wadham's Castle, etc.) is a historic estate in the parish of Ilton, near Ilminster in Somerset, England. It was the principal seat of the Wadham family, and was called by Prince (d. 1723) their "noble moated seat of Meryfeild" (sic). The mansion house was demolished in 1618 by Sir John Wyndham (1558–1645), of Orchard Wyndham, a nephew and co-heir of Nicholas II Wadham (1531–1609), co-founder of Wadham College, Oxford, the last in the senior male line of the Wadham family. It bears no relation to the present large 19th-century grade II listed mansion known as Merryfield House, formerly the vicarage, immediately south of St Peter's Church, Ilton.

== Description ==
About 1 mile west-north-west of St Peter's Church, Ilton, the parish church of Ilton, situated on agricultural land south of RAF Merryfield aerodrome and between the disused railway line and the disused Chard Canal, is a moated site which is all that remains of the medieval fortified manor house of Merryfield (or Muryfield), which was the seat of the ancient Wadham family. The Wadham family originated at the manor of Wadham in the parish of Knowstone, in North Devon. Wadeham was a manor recorded in the Domesday Book of 1086 as held in-chief from King William the Conqueror by the Saxon thane Ulf, who had held it since before the Norman Conquest of 1066. Such continuing holdings by Saxons after the Conquest are very rare, and Ulf in 1086 is still described as one of "The King's Thanes", so clearly was serving the new Norman king satisfactorily. The Wadhams other Devon seat, in the South of the county, was Edge in the parish of Branscombe.

The house was demolished in 1618. The rectangular moat remains and an area which may have been an associated fishpond for the supply of food to the household, particularly according to religious usage during Lent and on Fridays. In 1524 King Henry VIII granted a licence to empark to his courtier Sir Nicholas I Wadham (d. 1542), who had been present at the Field of Cloth of Gold in 1520, for him to make a park of 200 acres (81 ha) of woodland and 40 acres (16 ha) of woodland. The deer park so created was situated immediately to the east of the moated site.

The last of the family in the senior male line was Nicholas II Wadham (1531–1609), who posthumously with his widow Dorothy Petre, founded Wadham College, Oxford in 1610. Monuments to the Wadham family survive in St Peter's Church, Ilton and also on a grander scale in nearby St Mary's Church, Ilminster. The three sisters of Nicholas Wadham were (in their issue) his heirs, one of whom was Florence Wadham (died 1596), wife of Sir John Wyndham of Orchard Wyndham in Somerset, and mother of Sir John Wyndham (1558–1645). The Wyndham family, which later commonly used the first name "Wadham", inherited the estate of Merryfield and the "Wyndham Estate" is still today the largest employer in the village of Ilton.

== Descent ==
=== Popham ===
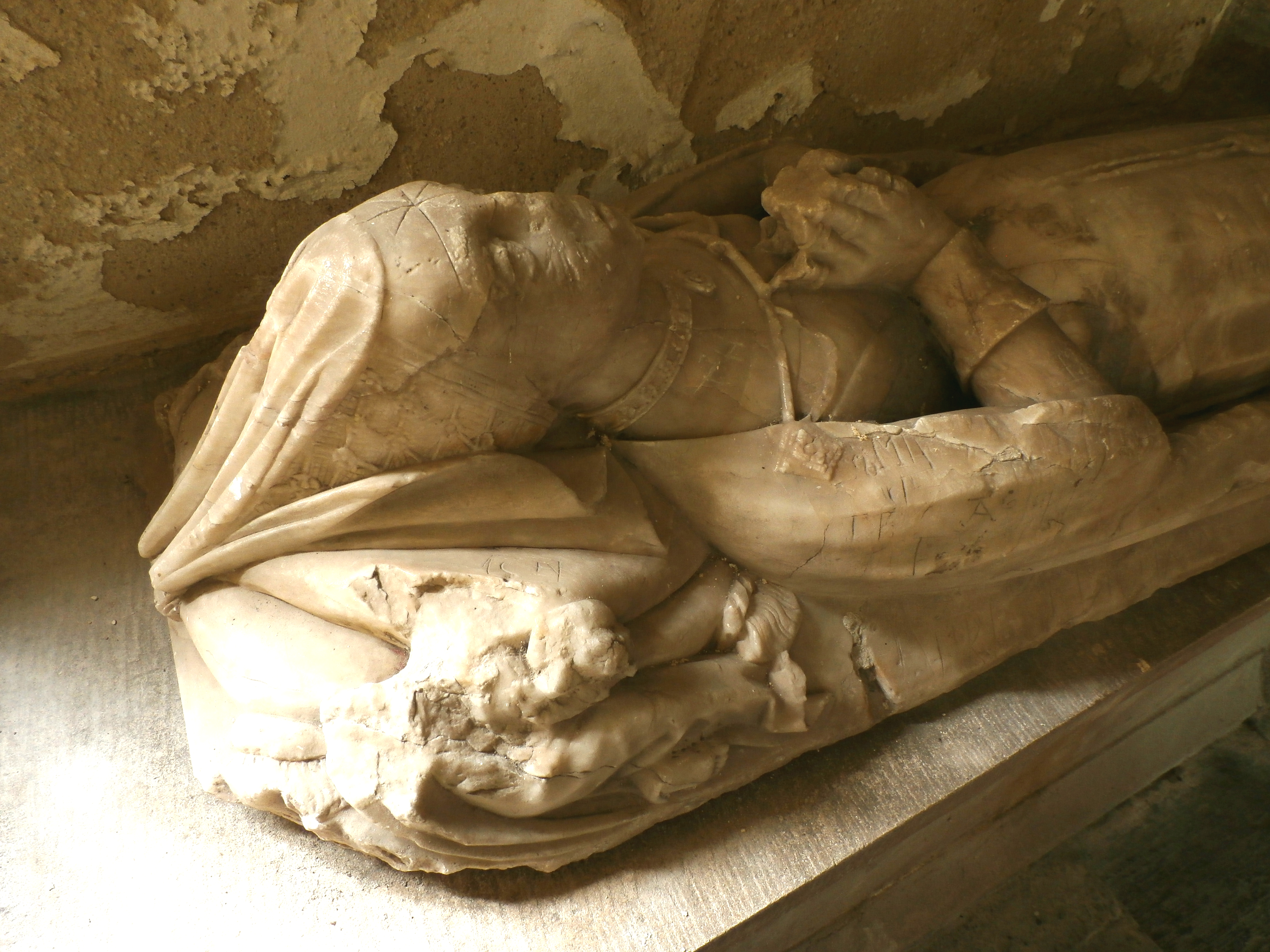
15th century alabaster effigy thought to represent Elizabeth Popham, heiress of Merryfield, Ilton Church. She was the wife of Sir John III Wadham and the collar of roses worn around her neck is said to represent the crest of Wadham, a rose argent between a pair of antlers (as visible on the monument to Nicholas II Wadham (died 1609) in Ilminster Church)

The last of the Pophams to hold the manor of Braydon, near Merryfield, apparently not, however, as a principal seat, was Sir Stephen Popham (c. 1386 – 1444) of Popham, Hampshire, five times MP for Hampshire. A junior branch of the Popham family was seated at Huntworth, Somerset, of which a prominent member was John Popham (c. 1531 – 1607), Speaker of the House of Commons and Lord Chief Justice of England. Sir Stephen Popham died without male issue and his five daughters became his co-heiresses. The manor of Braydon, near Merryfield, went to his daughter Elizabeth Popham the wife of Sir John III Wadham.

=== Wadham ===
==== Sir John III Wadham ====
Sir John III Wadham, eldest son and heir of William Wadham (d. 1452) of Edge, Branscombe in Devon, Sheriff of Devon in 1442, by his wife Margaret Chiselden, a daughter and co-heiress of John Chiselden of Holcombe Rogus in Devon. He married Elizabeth Popham, a daughter and co-heiress of Sir Stephen Popham (c. 1386 – 1444). From this marriage the Wadhams inherited land in Braydon, near Merryfield, which they made their principal seat. It is believed by Rogers (1888) that the small but finely sculpted surviving alabaster effigy of a lady in Ilton Church represents Elizabeth Popham, heiress of Merryfield.

==== Sir John IV Wadham ====
Sir John IV Wadham, son and heir, who married Elizabeth Stucley, a daughter of Sir Hugh Stucley (c. 1398–1457) of Trent, Somerset, Sheriff of Devon in 1449.

==== Sir Nicholas I Wadham (died 1542) ====
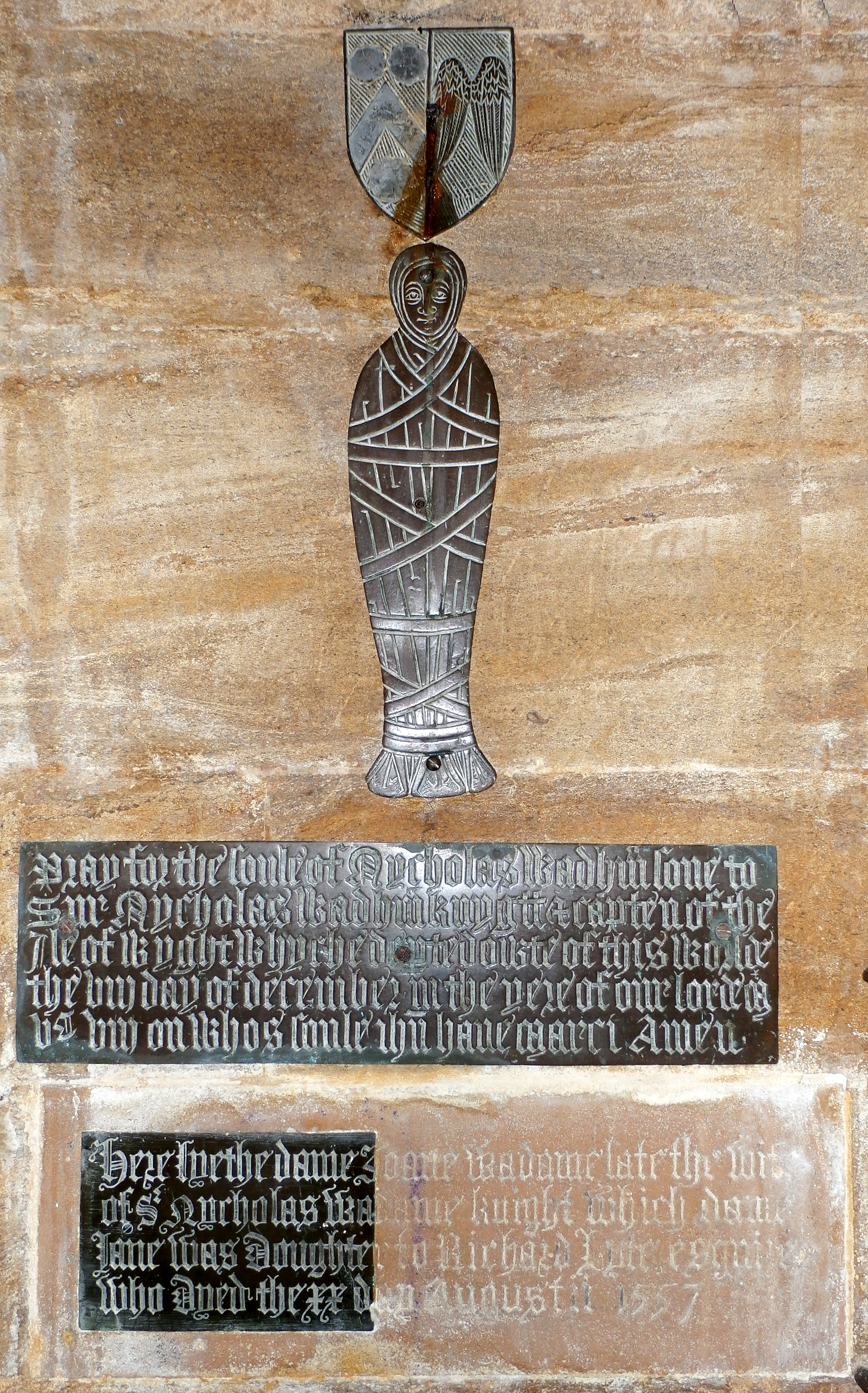
Monumental brasses to Nicholas Wadham (1508–1508) infant son of Sir Nicholas I Wadham (d. 1542) of Merryfield, by his 2nd wife Margaret Seymour, aunt (not as often stated "sister") of Queen Jane Seymour. The lowest inscription is in memory of his fourth wife Jane Lyte. Ilton Church

Sir Nicholas I Wadham (d. 1542), son and heir, who married four times. By his first wife Joan Hill, daughter of Robert Hill of Halfway and Houndstone, he had issue Lawrence Wadham, who died without progeny, and John Wadham (d. 1578), his eventual heir.

==== John V Wadham (died 1578) ====
John V Wadham (d. 1578), 2nd son and eventual heir, who is chiefly remembered for having been the father of Nicholas Wadham (1531/2-1609), co-founder Wadham College, Oxford and for the surviving mural monument to his wife in Branscombe Church on which appears his effigy and armorials. He married Joan Tregarthin (. 1583), a daughter and co-heiress of John Tregarthin of Cornwall and widow of John Kelloway of Cullompton, Devon.

==== Nicholas II Wadham (1531/2–1609) ====
- Nicholas II Wadham (1531/2–1609), eldest son and heir, co-founder with his wife Dorothy Petre of Wadham College, Oxford. He died without progeny when his heirs became the descendants of his three sisters.
- Florence Wadham (d. 1596), sister, wife of Sir John Wyndham of Orchard Wyndham, Watchet, Somerset and mother of Sir John Wyndham (1558–1645), ancestor of the Wyndham Earls of Egremont of Petworth House in Sussex.

=== Wyndham ===
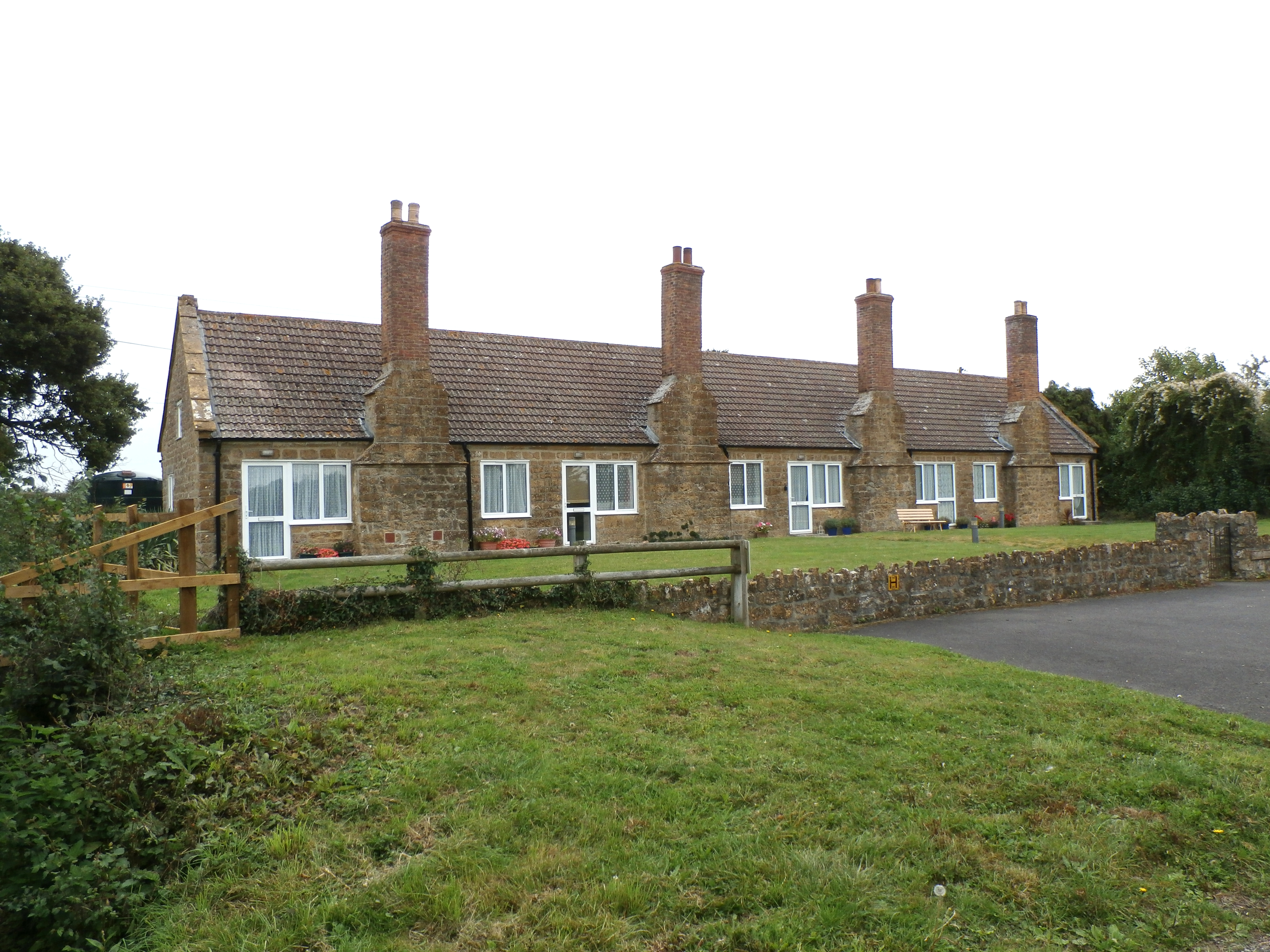
Almshouses on Merryfield Lane, Ilton, built by Sir John Wyndham (1558–1645), believed to have been made from materials from the demolished Merryfield House.

- Sir John Wyndham (1558–1645), of Orchard Wyndham, who demolished Merryfield. According to Collinson (1791):

"When John Wyndham came to the estate, disliking the situation of the house, because it was surrounded with wood, he pulled it down, and with the materials built a farm-house at a little distance, now called Woodhouse, and likewise an alms-house in the village of Ilton. There now remains no part of the ancient edifice, except an old wall on the east side. The seat was formerly moted round, and the buildings exhibited many striking indications of remote antiquity".

The Wyndham almshouses within the village of Ilton should not be confused with the almshouses built by Nicholas Wadham before his death: ”In the year 1606 he founded an almshouse for ‘eight poor people’ in the parish of Ilton, close to his house at Merifield, conveying to twelve trustees the building which he had lately erected for the purpose, together with a close ground adjoining thereto, and an annuity of £42 chargeable on his estates in Merifield, Braydon and Ilton. The deed of conveyance and the rules for the management of The Almshouses are interesting, and the building is still standing and serves its original purpose.”
