= Aunk =

Hamlet in Devon, England

Coordinates: 50.79°N 03.36°W

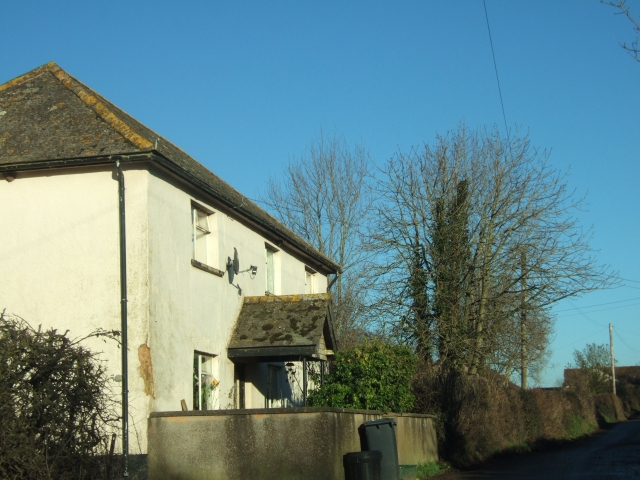
- A House in Aunk

- Location within Devon
- OS grid reference: ST0400
- Shire county: Devon
- Region: South West
- Country: England
- Sovereign state: United Kingdom
- Police: Devon and Cornwall
- Fire: Devon and Somerset
- Ambulance: South Western

Aunk (anciently Anke) is a small hamlet and former manor in the parish of Clyst Hydon in East Devon, England. The place-name is of Celtic origin along with other local place-names such as Hemyock and Whimple.
