= Nicholas Wadham (1531–1609) =

English benefactor (1531–1609)

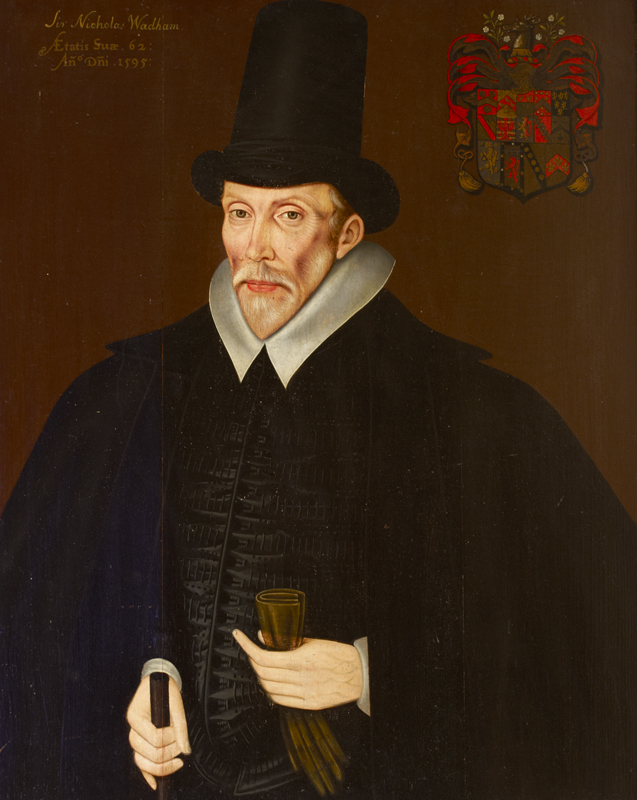
Nicholas Wadham (d. 1609), portrait c. 1595 by unknown artist. National Trust, collection of Petworth House, Sussex

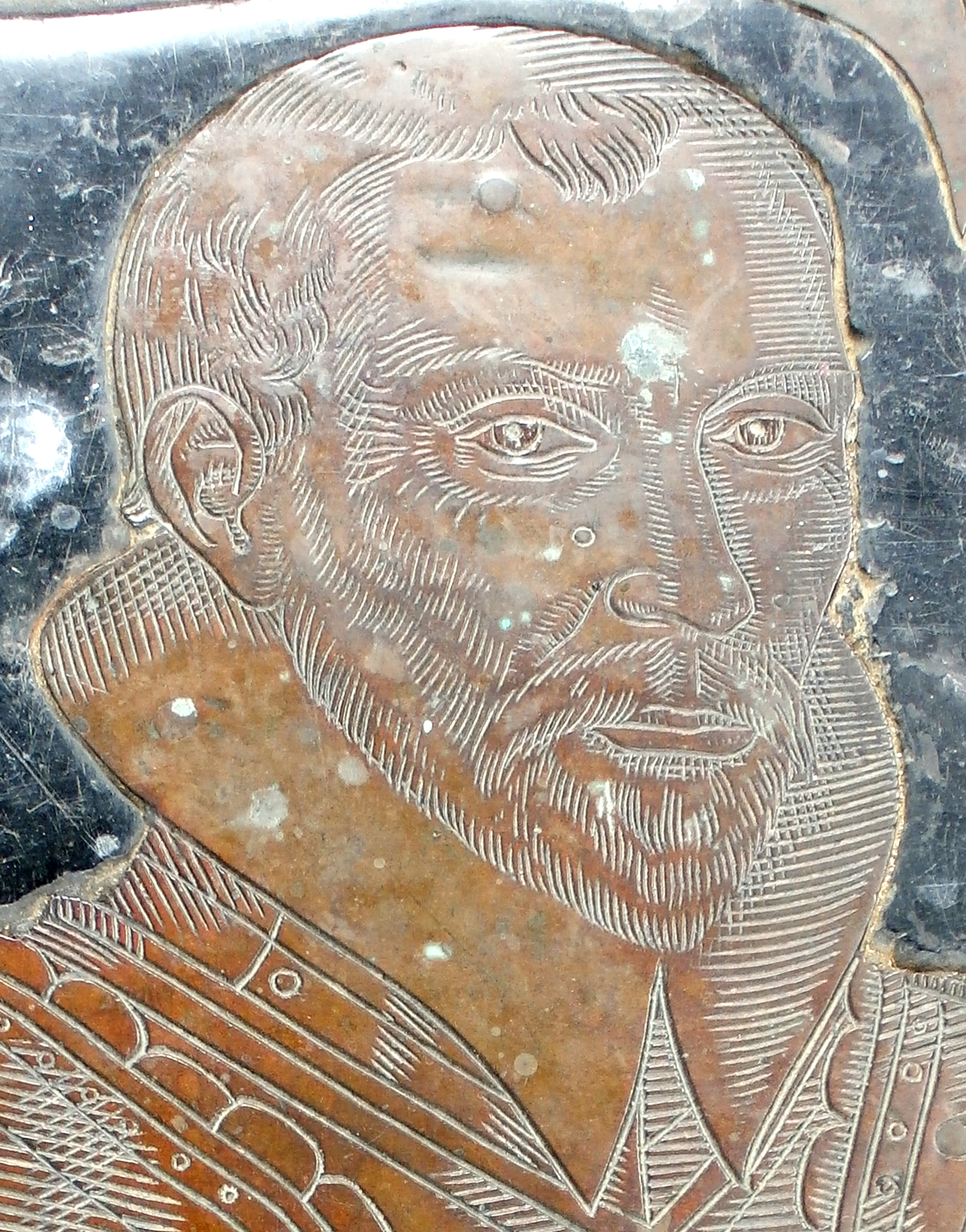
Nicholas Wadham (d. 1609), detail from his monumental brass in St Mary's Church, Ilminster

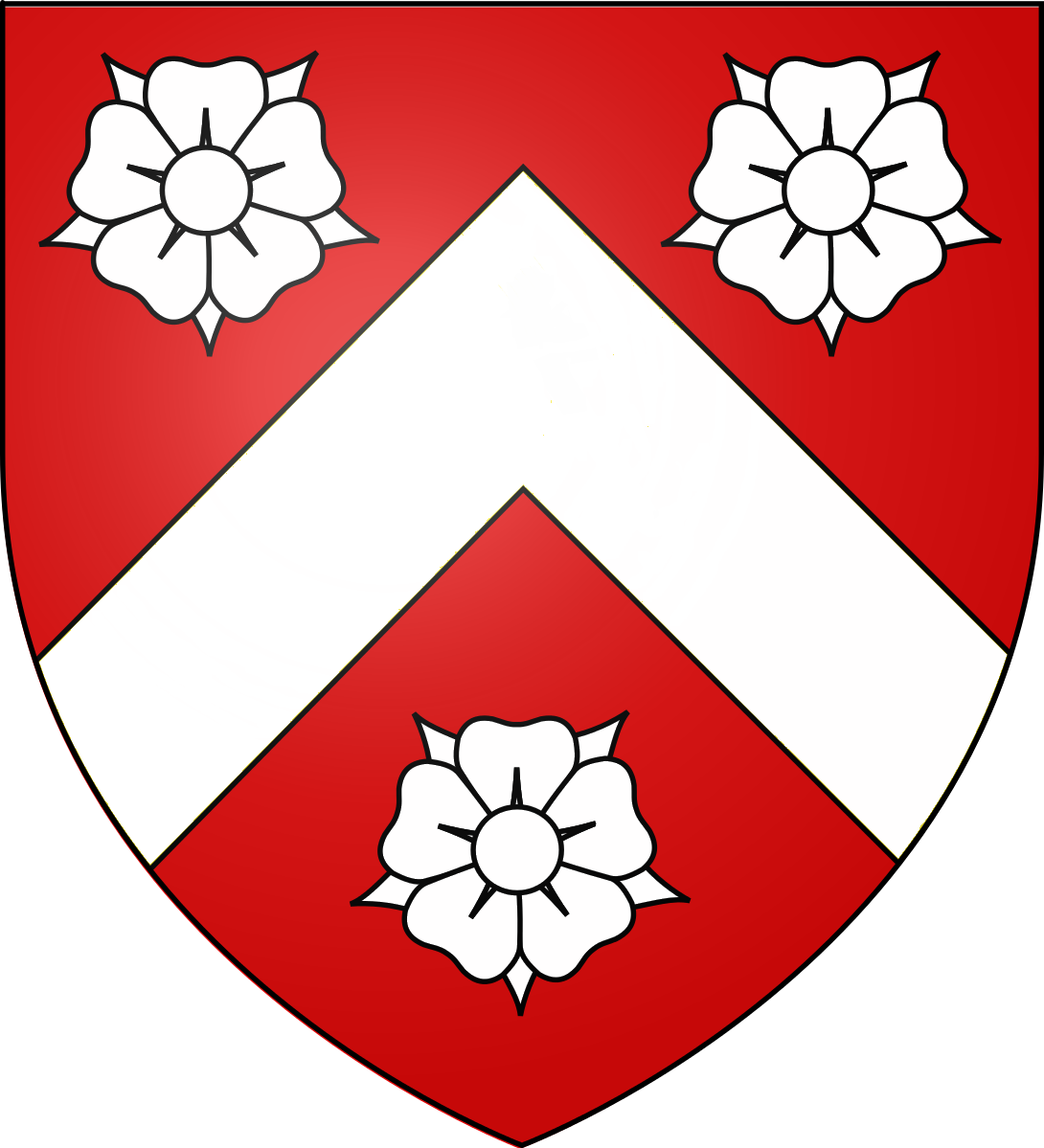
Arms of Wadham: Gules, a chevron between three roses argent

Nicholas Wadham (/ˈwɒdəm/ WOD-əm; 1531–1609) of Merryfield in the parish of Ilton, Somerset, and Edge in the parish of Branscombe, Devon, was a posthumous co-founder of Wadham College, Oxford, with his wife Dorothy Wadham who, outliving him, saw the project through to completion in her late old age. He was Sheriff of Somerset in 1585.

== Origins ==
Nicholas Wadham was probably born at Merryfield, a moated and fortified manor house, built around 1400 by his ancestor Sir John Wadham of Edge, a Justice of the Common Pleas in the reign of King Richard II.

He was the only surviving son of John Wadham (d. 1578) of Merryfield and Edge, Sheriff of Somerset and Dorset in 1556, by his wife Joan Tregarthin (d. 1583), daughter and co-heiress of John Tregarthin of Cornwall, and widow of John Kelloway of Cullompton, Devon.

Wadham's grandfather, Sir Nicholas Wadham (1472–1542), was a member of parliament in the English Reformation Parliament of 1529, Sheriff of Devon, Sheriff of Somerset and Dorset, Sheriff of Wiltshire, Captain of the Isle of Wight at Carisbrooke Castle, Vice Admiral to Thomas Howard, Earl of Surrey and, with his uncle, Sir Edward Wadham (Sheriff of Gloucestershire), accompanied King Henry VIII to the Field of the Cloth of Gold in 1520.

== Career ==
A biography written before 1637 states that Wadham attended Corpus Christi College, Oxford as a commoner, but did not take a degree. He may have lodged with John Kennall, the civil lawyer, later canon of Christ Church Cathedral, Oxford. Wadham was briefly at court, as the text relates: vitam aulicam aliquantisper ingressus est ("he entered the courtly life for a moderately long time"). A certain "Nicholas Wadham of Brimpton, Somerset", was admitted to the Inner Temple on 9 March 1553 on the pledge of Richard Baker, who was married to Catherine Tyrell, a stepdaughter of Sir William Petre (Wadham's father-in-law), Principal Secretary to King Henry VIII. Due to the Petre connection, it is likely that the record refers to the Nicholas Wadham who is the subject of this article.

Wadham was appointed to the commission of the peace and other minor commissions in Somerset, appearing as executor and overseer in the wills of other Somerset gentlemen. Two personal letters of his exist, one from Sir Amias Paulet (1532–1588), Ambassador to Paris, advising that Wadham was unlikely 'to be envious of our French news' and thanking him for his efforts in the leasing of Paulet's park. The other letter was to Sir John Talbot of Grafton (1545–1611), who had married Dorothy's sister Katherine Petre, regarding Wadham's work in negotiating a lease. Wadham was known for his hospitality and he maintained a fine household at Merifield, described by Thomas Fuller (1608–1661) as "an inn at all times, a court at Christmas".

Wadham and his wife were suspected of recusancy. In 1608 the privy council ordered a stay of proceedings against both Wadham and his wife on a charge of recusancy. John Carpenter, Rector of Branscombe, dedicated to him his literary work "Contemplations", for the Institution of Children in the Christian Religion (1601), noting his "gentle affability with all persons" and his generosity.

== Marriage ==
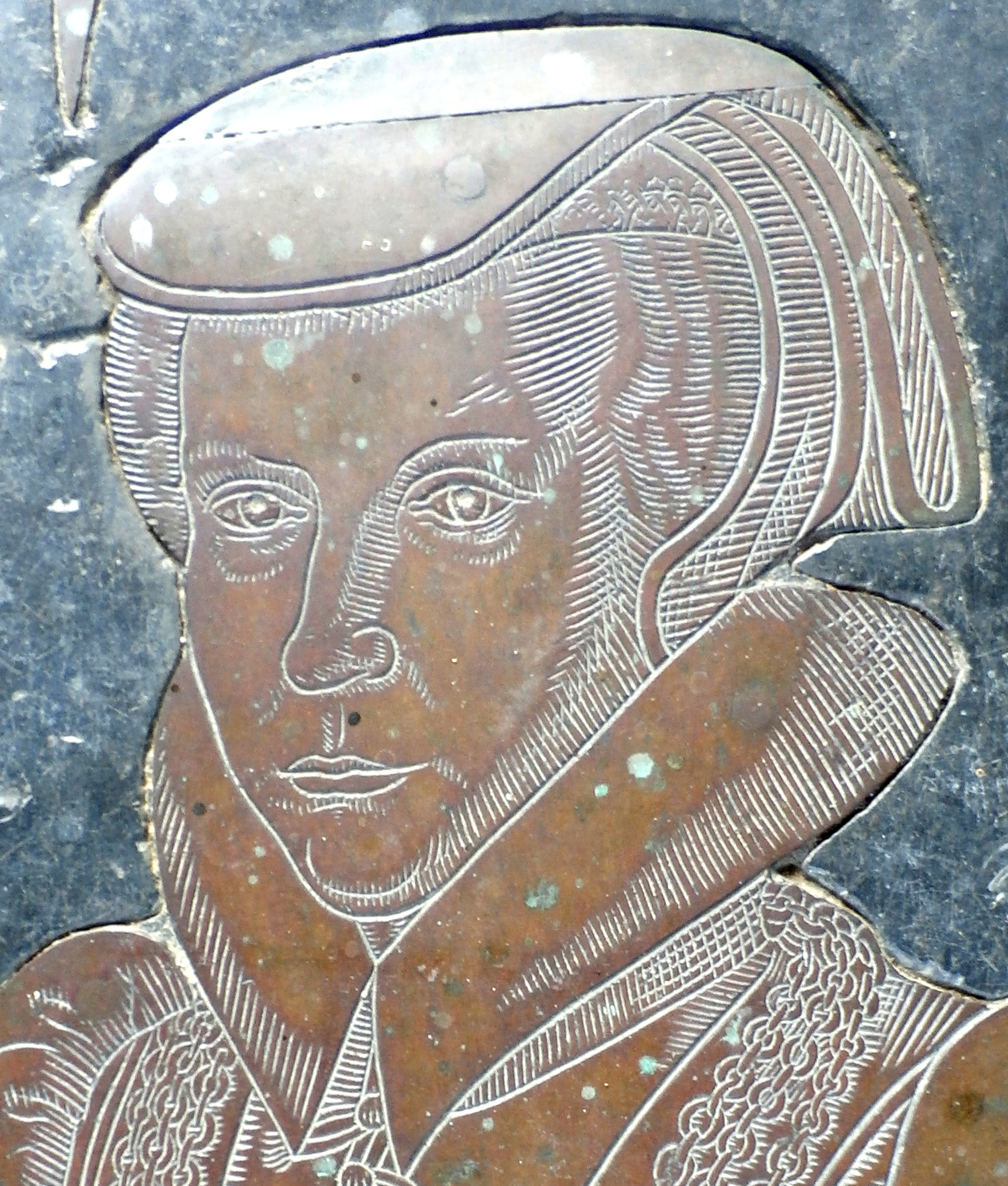
Dorothy Petre (d. 1618), wife of Nicholas Wadham. Detail from her monumental brass in St Mary's Church, Ilminster

On 3 September 1555 at St Botolph's, Aldersgate in the City of London, Nicholas Wadham married Dorothy Petre (1534/5–1618), the eldest daughter of Sir William Petre, Principal Secretary to King Henry VIII. The couple had no children. Wadham and his wife lived with his parents until his father's death in 1578, when his mother moved into her dower house at Edge. Her monumental tomb survives in the Church of St Winifred, Branscombe, Devon.

== Death and burial ==
On 20 October 1609, aged seventy-seven, Wadham died at Merrifield. In his will he left the huge sum of £500 (equivalent to £117,868 in 2023) for his funeral expenses and directed his body to be buried "in myne ile at Ilminster where myne auncestors lye interred". He was duly buried in the Wadham chapel in the Church of St Mary, Ilminster on 21 November 1609; his monument survives in the north-east corner of the Chapel (north transept) of St Mary's. It consists of a 1689 Baroque monument erected by his subsequent heirs Sir Edward Wyndham, 2nd Baronet and Thomas Strangways on which was re-placed the Purbeck marble slab inset with late-Gothic-style post-Reformation monumental brasses from the original monument which had collapsed. The monument was again restored in 1899 by the architect Thomas Graham Jackson (1835–1924). There is, according to A. K. Wickham, "no finer post-Reformation brass in England".

Following his father's example, his will ordered a full heraldic funeral, with alms to be distributed throughout the county. Statues survive of Nicholas Wadham and his wife Dorothy Petre at their foundation, Wadham College, Oxford, high on the external wall of one of the buildings. Thomas Moore (1779–1852) described him as "an ancient schismatic", referring to his attendance at Church of England services, and described Wadham as "dying a Catholic".

== Succession ==
At his death he owned almost 30 manors and other lands and tenements in the counties of Devon, Dorset and Somerset, including:

- Manor of Wadham, Knowstone, Devon: original seat of the family, from which they took their name
- Manor of Silverton, Devon: purchased in 1386 by Sir John Wadham
- Edge in Branscombe, Devon: estate purchased c. 1370 by Sir John Wadham
- Merryfield in Ilton near Yeovil, Somerset which became the main seat of the family: built on land purchased around 1400 by Sir John Wadham from Cecily de Beauchamp a sister and co-heiress of John Beauchamp, 3rd Baron Beauchamp of Somerset of the feudal barony of Hatch Beauchamp, with nearby land at Braydon inherited by a later generation of the Wadham family from Sir Stephen Popham.
- Broad life [sic]
- Pole Anthony (from the Rede (or Read) family to Popham to Wadham)
- Manor of Penselwood, Somerset: part of the inheritance of Margaret Chiseldon of the Manor of Holcombe Rogus, Devon, who married Sir William Wadham (died 1452).
- Chiselborough, Somerset
- Manor of Haydon, Somerset
- Norcot
- Widicomb
- Sydmouth
- Wirgland
- Manor of Lustleigh, Devon purchased 1403 by Sir John Wadham. The medieval hall and solar still exist: "Uphill and Great Hall, Mapstone Hill: A major medieval house preserving two fine roofs, the property of the Wadham family of Ilminster in the C15 ..The date may be c.1400."
- Eton
- Tidcock
- Oldbury
- Cullioford
- Guttesham (not Gittesham, Devon, never held by Wadham)

He died childless, and all his estates and other wealth had been expected to pass to the children of his three sisters:

- Joan Wadham (d. 1603), widow of Sir Giles Strangways, MP, ancestors of the Earls of Ilchester, and then Sir John Young, MP. She bore the former 4 sons and 2 daughters, and the latter 2 daughters and a son. In 1592, she was a party in the landmark Case of the Swans.
- Margaret Wadham, wife of Sir Nicholas Martyn (1529–1595) of Athelhampton, Dorset. The couple's monumental brass, showing them kneeling beneath an escutcheon with the ancient arms of FitzMartin (Argent, two bars gules) impaling Wadham, survives in St Mary's Church, Puddletown, Dorset. Nicholas Martyn, in full armour, kneels bare-headed before an altar on which is an open book. His three sons, who all predeceased him, kneel behind him. To the right is his wife Margaret Wadham, behind whom kneel their seven daughters, of whom four survived as co-heiresses. Athelhampton descended by marriage of their daughter Elizabeth Martin to Henry Brune to Mary Brune, who married Sir Ralph Bankes of Kingston Lacy and Corfe Castle, their great-great-granddaughter.
- Florence Wadham (d. 1596), wife of Sir John Wyndham (d. 1572) of Orchard Wyndham, Watchet, in Somerset, and mother of Sir John Wyndham (1558–1645), ancestor of the Wyndham Earls of Egremont of Petworth House in Sussex.

Instead he determined to use much of his wealth to perpetuate his name and in 1606 he founded an almshouse for eight poor people at Ilton. Wadham had also been saving money to found a college at Oxford, yet his intentions had not been written down and his instructions on his death-bed were contradictory. Despite this, his wife Dorothy, adding much of her own paternal inheritance, attended to his wishes and, in her old age, oversaw the construction Wadham College, Oxford to its completion.

The descendants of his sisters nevertheless still received large inheritances from Nicholas Wadham, including the manor of Ilton (to Wyndham); the manor of Wadham, Knowstone, (to Wyndham and Strangways); Lustleigh (to Wyndham and Strangways); Edge, Branscombe (to Wyndham and Strangways), Silverton in Devon (to Wyndham); Chiselborough (to Strangways) etc. Today, in 2017, the Wadham family's Merryfield estate is still owned by the Wyndham family of Orchard Wyndham.
