= William Henry Hamilton Rogers =

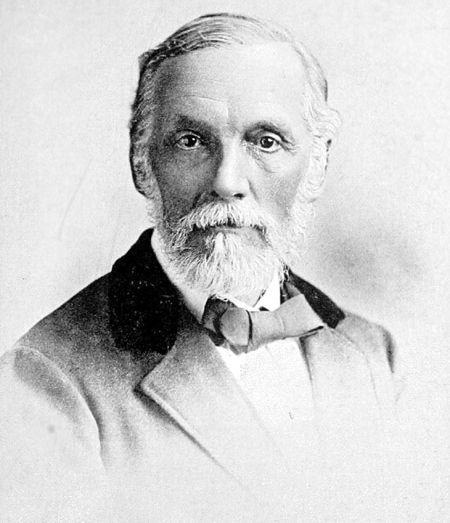
W.H. Hamilton Rogers, portrait circa 1890

William Henry Hamilton Rogers (1 October 1834 – 20 November 1913), Fellow of the Society of Antiquaries of London (FSA), (works published as "W.H. Hamilton Rogers"), of Ridgeway Row in Colyton, Devon, was an English historian and antiquarian who specialised in the West Country of England. He frequently worked with the illustrator Roscoe Gibbs.

== List of publications ==
- Bells of Memory, 1862
- The Spirit of the Minor Prophets Metrically Rendered, 1865
- The Ancient Sepulchral Effigies and Monumental and Memorial Sculpture of Devon, Exeter, 1877
  - archive.org text
- The Fate of Clifton-Maubank, 1888
- Memorials of the West, Historical and Descriptive, Collected on the Borderland of Somerset, Dorset and Devon, Exeter, 1888
  - archive.org text
    - List of chapters: Beer and its Quarry; John Prince, the Devonshire Biographer; The fate of Clifton-Maubank (Horsey); Augustus Mantague Toplady: His Home in Devon; A Seventeenth Century Bellfounder; Two Georgian Secretaries-at-War (Yonge); The Shrine of an Old Freemason; The Cradle of Marlborough; The Founder and Foundress of Wadham; A Tudor Baron and Earl (Daubeney); Memories of the Vale of Coly; The Cistercian at the Source of Culm; The Nest of Carew (Ottery-Mohun); Traditions of Colcombe (Courtenay and Pole); Axmouth and Bindon;
- The Strife of the Roses & Days of the Tudors in the West, Exeter, 1890.
  - on-line text, freefictionbooks
  - on-line text, with images, Project Gutenburg
  - archive.org text
    - List of chapters: 1: "Our Steward of Household", Robert, Lord Willoughby de Broke, KG; 2: Extinct for the White Rose, William Lord Bonville, KG; 3: Under the Hoof of the White Boar, Henry Stafford, 2nd Duke of Buckingham, KG; 4: Unhorsed at Bosworth, John, Lord Cheyney, KG; 5: "With the Silver Hand", Stafford of Suthwyke, Archbishop and Earl; 6: "They did Cast him", Sir Thomas Arundell, KB; 7: Of the Imperial Line, Theodoro Paleologus. 183
- Maps and plans of old Southampton, Southampton, Southampton record Society, vol.3
- Wanderings in Devon
  - Chapters include: Beer and its Quarry; The Nest of the Mohuns and Carews; The Cradle of Marlborough; The Founder of Wadham; John Prince the Devonshire Biographer; Toplady and his Devonshire home; The great House, Colyton, and Who Lived There; Dunkeswell Abbey and its Founder; Colcombe and the Devonshire Antiquary; Axmouth and its Landslip.
- West-Country Stories and Sketches: Biographical and Historical, 1895
- Archaeological Papers Relating to the Counties of Somerset, Willts, Hants and Devon, Published by Barnicott and Pearce, Athenaeum Press, 1902
