= Manor of Silverton =

Historic manor in Devon, England

Coordinates: 50.813°N 3.460°W

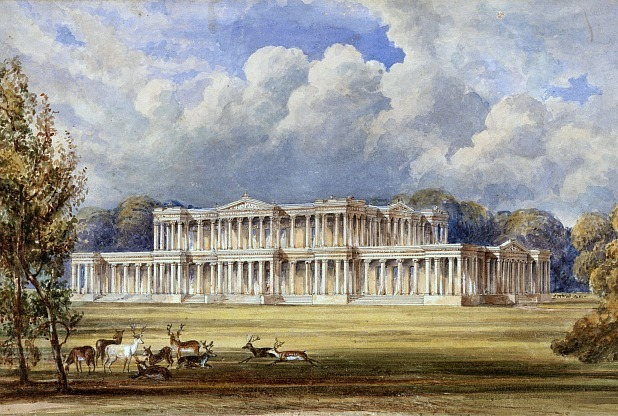
Silverton Park, south front

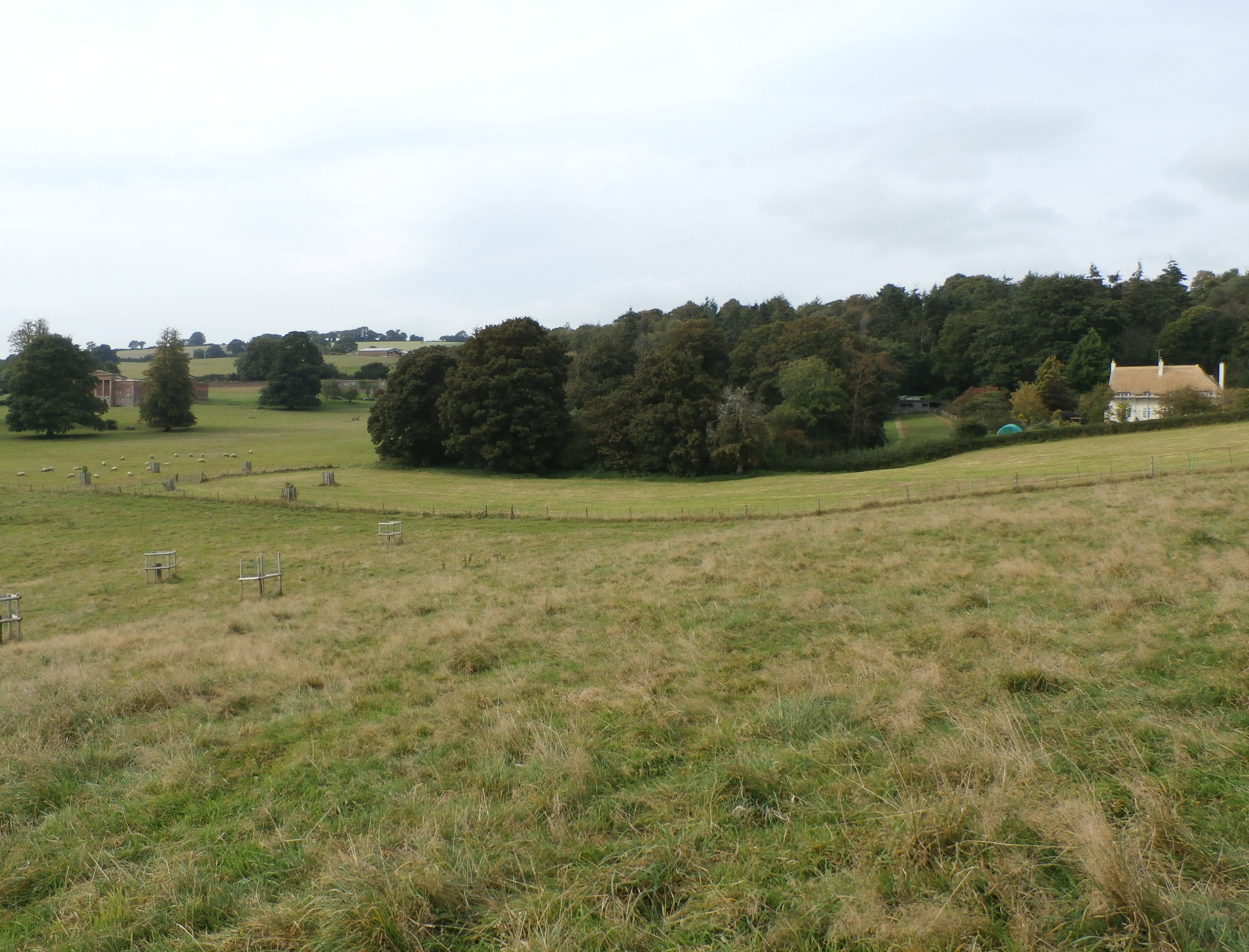
Centre: Site of Silverton Park in 2014, now overgrown with trees, viewed from south-east. Left: (west), surviving red-brick stable block; Right (east): modern thatched cottage-orné named "Combe Satchfield", the original name of the estate

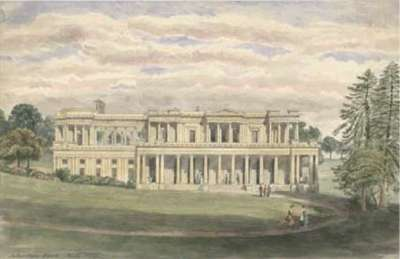
Silverton Park, west front, 1879 water colour by Edward Ashworth, collection of Devon County Council

The manor of Silverton was an historic manor in the parish of Silverton in Devon. The last version of the manor house was Silverton Park (also called Egremont House), a large neoclassical mansion house built in 1839–45 by George Wyndham, 4th Earl of Egremont (1786–1845) and demolished in 1901. It was according to Pevsner and Cherry (1991) "an extraordinary design, entirely clothed in colonnades", but was "a monstrous Italian house" in the opinion of Bernard Coleridge, 2nd Baron Coleridge (1851–1927). It comprised as its core the former early Georgian manor house of Combe Satchfield.

== Combe Satchfield ==
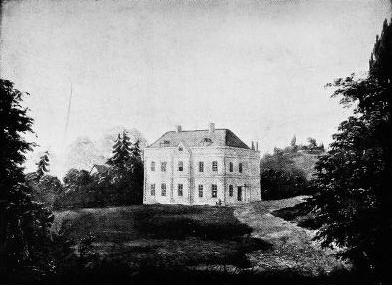
Combsatchfield House, pre-1905 photograph of a pre-1839 painting, published in The Story of a Devonshire House (1905) by Bernard Coleridge, 2nd Baron Coleridge, whose grandfather as a child was a frequent visitor there to his "Aunt Brown"

The house was built on the site of the early Georgian manor house of Combe Satchfield, anciently Culme Sachville, which formed the core of the new building.

=== Domesday Book ===
The manor called by Pole (d.1635) Culm Sachvill and Culm Reigny was said by him to have been "neere the river of Culme", from which the nearby town of Collumpton is named, "the chiefest place on her stream that beareth her name" (Risdon). In the Domesday Book of 1086 it was recorded as COLVN (i.e. "Colun"), and was one of eleven manors held in Devon in-chief from King William the Conqueror by his Saxon thane Godwin. The latter was one of only twenty Saxon thanes in Devonshire who survived the Norman Conquest of 1066 and retained their antiquated high status as thanes and became tenants-in-chief under the new Norman king. There had however been various changes in the manors held by this select group of Saxon thanes after the Norman Conquest as of the eleven manors Godwin held under the Norman king in 1086, he had held only three in 1066 under King Edward the Confessor, namely Chittlehampton, Holbrook and Down Umfraville. The extra eight manors he held in 1086, including COLVN, had all previously been held by the Saxon Alstan, who held nothing in 1086. Culme was in the ancient hundred of Hayridge.

=== Honour of Gloucester ===
Most of the lands of the Saxon thanes of William the Conqueror eventually passed to the feudal barony of Gloucester, as was the case with Culme.

==== Tenants of Honour of Gloucester ====
===== de Reigny =====
Culme was held by John Reigny at the start of the reign of King Henry III (1216–1272), when it was known as Culme Reigny. The de Reigny Anglo-Norman family held much land elsewhere in Devon, and other manors took their name, for example the surviving Ashreigney. Other Devon manors held at some time by the de Reigny family included Eggesford.

===== de Humfraville =====
Culm Rengy was later held by John de Humfravill, whose Anglo-Norman family (alias de Umfraville, etc.) was tenant of several other manors from the Honour of Gloucester, including Down Umfraville in the hundred of Axmouth, which had been held by Godwin the thane both before and after the Norman Conquest. Sir Gilbert Umfraville of Penmark was one of the Twelve Knights of Glamorgan, the legendary followers of Robert FitzHamon (d.1107), the Norman conqueror of Glamorgan and first Norman feudal baron of Gloucester. Culme does not appear to have taken for suffix the name of this family.

===== de Sachville =====
In the Book of Fees Colm Reyngny was recorded as held from the Honour of Gloucester by Robert de Sicca Villa (literally "from the dry town", the Latinized form of the Norman-French de Sacheville). Thereafter the manor was known as Culme Sachville, later corrupted and Anglicised to Sackville, Sachfield, etc. The name of Culme even later became corrupted to Combe, a common form in Devon, such as Combe Martin, Branscombe, etc., which were however named from their locations in the steep sided valleys of Devonshire called in the local vernacular "combes". The landscape at Combe Satchfield is however comparatively flat and a steep-sided valley does not exist in the immediate vicinity. It was variously recorded as held by Robert and Phillip Sachville. Other manors held at some time by the Sachville family or branches thereof included Heanton Satchville, Petrockstowe and Bicton. Their chief manor in Devonshire was Clist Sachville.

===== Others =====
An heiress named Margaret, possibly of the Sachville family, brought it by marriage to her husband Sir Simon Meriet. It was later inherited by the Courtenay family of Powderham, apparently having been exchanged for other lands with the Bonville family of Shute, (the great rivals of their cousins the Courtenay Earls of Devon of Tiverton Castle) who sold it to Henry Skibbow, whose son was resident there in about 1630. The Courtenays sold part of the estate to the father of Mr Laund of Woodbeare, who held it in about 1630. The other part the Courtenays sold to Edward Drewe of Sharpham, Serjeant-at-Law, whose son Sir Thomas Drewe (d.1651) of The Grange of Dunkeswell Abbey, Broadhembury, Sheriff of Devon in 1612, sold it (together with Killerton, to which it adjoins, the later Acland seat) to Sir Arthur Acland (d.1610) of Acland. In 1654 it was the property of Gilbert Mortimer, of the Mortimer family of Poundesland and Stockwell House.

=== Langford ===
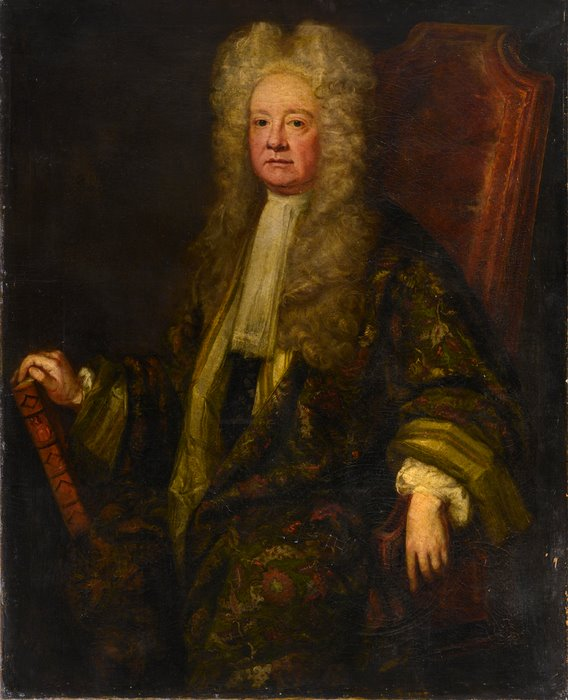
Sir Henry Langford, 3rd Baronet (c.1656–1725), of Combe Satchfield and Kingskerswell, Devon, a judge and Sheriff of Devon. 1710 portrait by William Gandy (1650–1729). Royal Albert Memorial Museum, Exeter

The overlordship of the feudal barony of Gloucester can be assumed to have disappeared following the abolition of feudal land tenure in England by the Tenures Abolition Act 1660. In 1720 the estate was purchased by the judge Sir Henry Langford, 3rd Baronet (c.1656–1725), of Gray's Inn, Sheriff of Devon in 1716, who also owned estates at Bradninch and who in 1710 had purchased the manor of Kingskerswell where his successor Henry II Langford Brown (1802-1857) built Barton Hall.

He was from a prominent Irish family, the second son of Sir Hercules Langford, 1st Baronet (c.1625-1683), of Kilmackedrett, County Antrim, by his wife Mary Upton, a daughter of Henry Upton of Castle Upton, County Antrim. The arms of Langford of Kilmackedrett were: Paly of six sable and or, on a chief vert a lion passant guardant of the second which were visible on the facade of the now demolished Antrim Castle. These arms are almost identical to those of the Langford gentry family of Bratton Clovelly in Devon, of whom the earliest recorded head was Richard Langsford (died 1583). Sir Henry Langford's portrait, now in the collection of the Royal Albert Memorial Museum in Exeter, was painted in 1710 by William Gandy (1650–1729). He died in 1725 without male issue, when the baronetcy became extinct. He bequeathed all his Devonshire estates to his godson, Thomas Brown. The Irish estates appear to have gone to the descendants of his sister Mary Langford, the wife of Sir John Rowley. Mary Langford's grandson was Hercules Langford Rowley, husband of Elizabeth Upton, who was created Viscountess Langford in 1766. Hercules Rowley's daughter, Hon Jane Rowley, married Thomas Taylour, 1st Earl of Bective. Lord Bective's fourth son was created Baron Langford in 1800.

=== Langford-Brown ===
==== Thomas Brown ====
In compliance with the terms of his inheritance Thomas Brown assumed the surname Langford-Brown. His son and heir was Henry I Langford-Brown (1721–1800).

==== Henry I Langford-Brown (1721–1800) ====
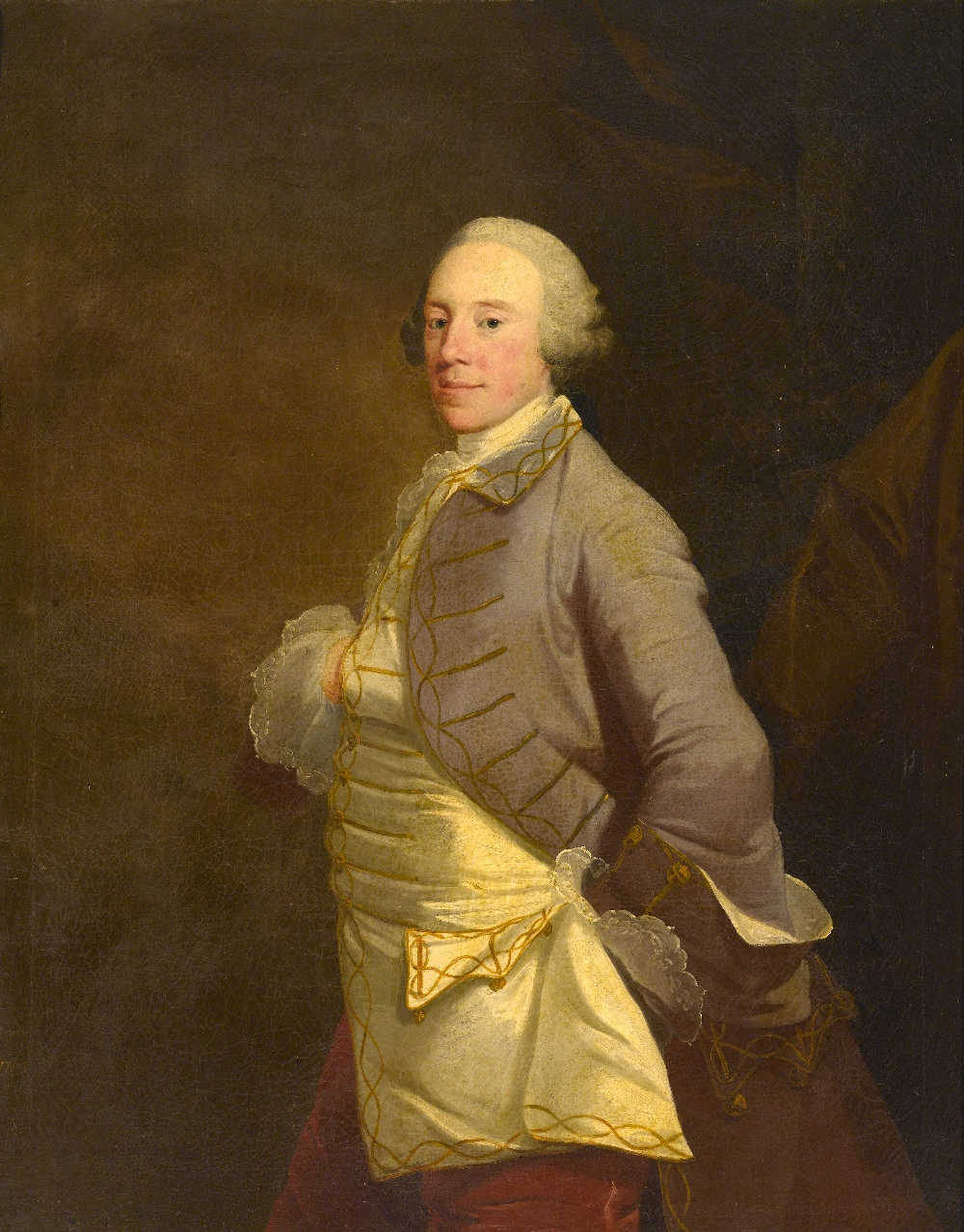
1756 portrait of Henry I Langford Brown (1721–1800), of Comb Satchfield and Kingskerswell, Devon. British (English) School. Collection of Royal Albert Memorial Museum, Exeter

Henry I Langford-Brown (1721–1800), son (possibly grandson) of Thomas Brown. In his will he left a life interest in Combe Satchfield to his second wife Dorothy Taylor, with reversion after her death to his brother Thomas I Langford Brown. He married twice:

- Firstly to Frances Tucker (1724–1769), whose mural monument survives in Silverton Church. She was the third daughter of William Tucker, Esq., of Coryton Park, Kilmington, Devon. By Frances he had eleven children, two of whom died as infants.
- Secondly to Dorothy Ayre Taylor (died 1831), (whose portrait was painted by John Keenan ), by whom he had no further progeny. She was one of the two daughters of Bernard Frederick Taylor, of Islington, Middlesex, a merchant of the City of London, by his wife Frances Duke, one of five sisters and co-heiresses of Robert Duke (d.1741), lord of the manor of Otterton in Devon. Dorothy's sister was Frances Duke Taylor, the wife of Col. James Coleridge (1759–1836) of Ottery St Mary, the brother of the poet Samuel Taylor Coleridge (1772–1834), both sons of Reverend John Coleridge (1718–1781), Vicar of Ottery St Mary. James Coleridge's son, the judge Sir John Taylor Coleridge (1790–1876), remembered visiting his "Aunt Brown" at Combsatchfield (as it had become known), and details concerning his visits as a child to Combsatchfield were published in the 1905 work "The Story of a Devonshire House" (a history of the Coleridge family) by his grandson Bernard Coleridge, 2nd Baron Coleridge (1851–1927):

"The great joy of all the boys was to spend their holidays with "Aunt Brown" at Combesatchfield, about ten miles away in the parish of Silverton. Mrs. Brown, the sister of Mrs. James Coleridge, was the widow of Henry Langford Brown. Childless herself, she thoroughly adopted her nephews and niece. After the stiff fashion of the day, the two sisters always called each other "Mrs. Brown" and " Mrs. Coleridge," and at the beginning of each holiday the same formula was used: " Very well, Mrs. Coleridge, I am very glad to have the boys, only remember I can't answer for them, and if they are drowned — and the ponds are very deep — or shoot themselves, or break their legs, I'm not to blame." This protest was perhaps not unnecessary when we know that there were two of these ponds on which excursions in tubs were wont to be made, also an old pistol or two, of which the boys had full command, and horses with which they did pretty much as they liked. Orchards too, gardens, fruit at discretion, a famous myrtle-walk, made Combesatchfield a paradise for the young. The mistress of the old-fashioned, stately square-built house was in keeping with its character. Too far from the parish church for her to walk, she always drove on Sunday in her dark green chariot with two fat horses and a postillion, in drab Jacket, all over buttons, with white leather breeches, top-boots, a black velvet cap surmounting all, with gold lace on the top, a very vision of splendour to youthful eyes. The postillion was always a Cookesley, a family which had hereditary claims to be part of the household. Every servant was to go to church, and the house, solitary as it was, to be locked up. She would not relax this rule, although every year, on the Sunday before Silverton Fair, the garden, famous for its apricots, was regularly robbed during church-time. The house and its antient features have departed, for on the death of Mrs. Brown in 1831 the property passed into the hands of her husband's family, who sold it to the last Lord Egremont. The dignified old Devonshire name of Combesatchfield was not fine enough for him, so he called it " Silverton Park," and proceeded to build a monstrous Italian house clean around the old building, which he never completed, and upon which he spent an idle fortune. A generation afterwards my grandfather, Sir John Taylor Coleridge, paid a visit to the paradise of his childhood. The new buildings were not finished. He entered through a portico, and after walking down a long passage came to the old green front door with its brass knocker. As he stood out-side it, waiting for it to be opened, he could hardly help expecting to see old Drewe the butler, and to hear the noise of the bolt being withdrawn as in old times. The house was never occupied. Lord Egremont spent vast sums on it, and died in 1845, leaving it unfinished, and finally in 1900 the materials were sold to housebreakers, who blew it up with dynamite. The Italian additions were easily demolished, but the kernel, the old brick house, was of tougher mould. Much of it still stands, a ruin which the kindly hand of Time will soon make venerable. The ponds, except one deep gloomy excavation in the rock from which a spring wells forth, the park, the myrtle-walk, are gone, and of the delights of old Combesatchfield and of the character and personality of its mistress nothing remains but a memory".

==== Thomas Langford Brown (1762–1833) ====
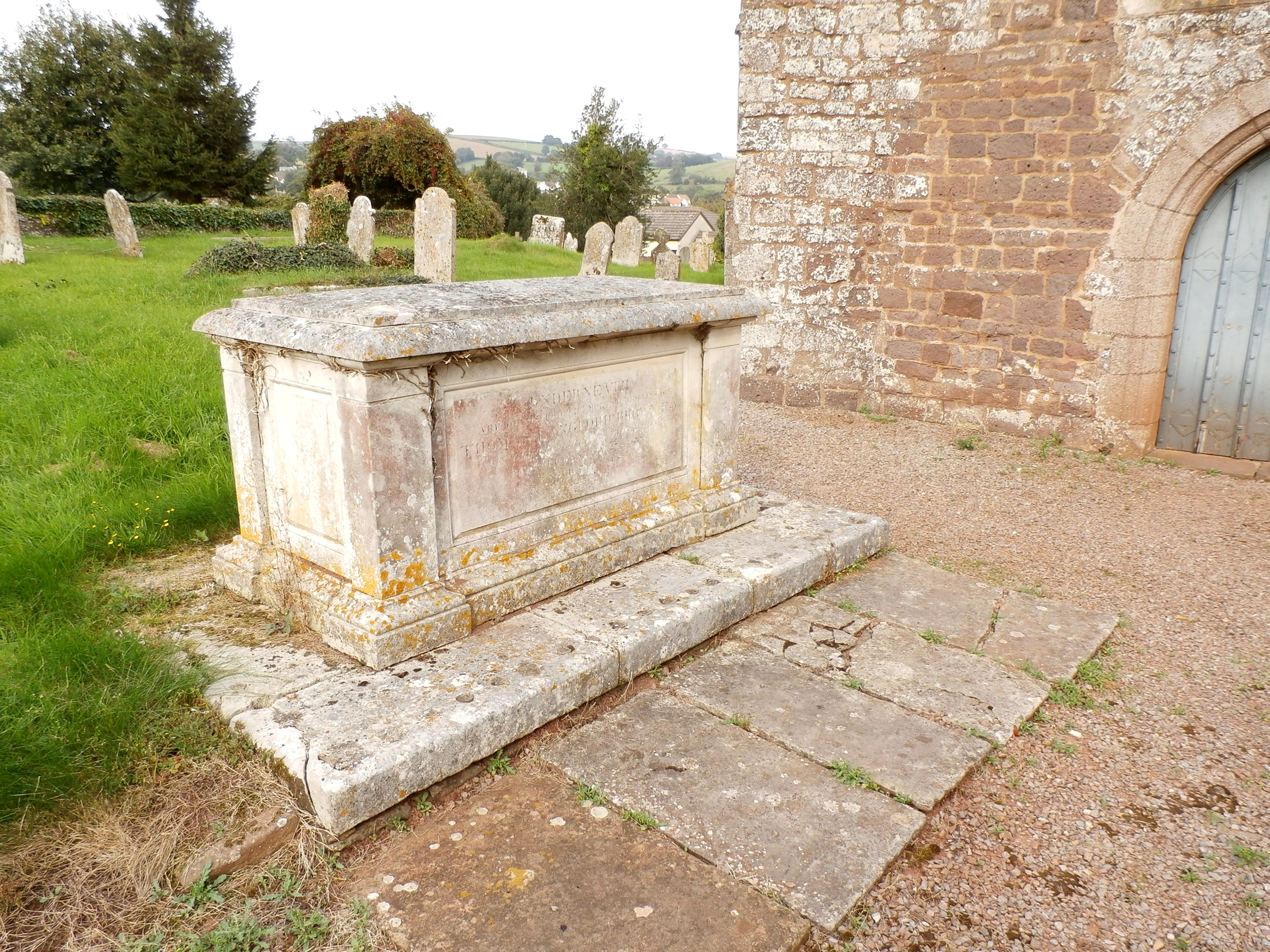
Chest tomb of Thomas II Langford Brown (1762–1833), outside west door of Silverton church

Thomas II Langford Brown (1762–1833) was either a son of Thomas I Langford Brown or of his brother Henry I Langford Brown. In 1779 he was promoted lieutenant in Simcoe's Rangers alias the Queen's American Rangers, which served in the American War of Independence. At the height of anti-American Republicanism in England, in 1793 he was one of the soldiers policing a march and demonstration in Topsham, Devon, by the loyalist citizens of Devon, supported by the local gentry. An effigy of Thomas Paine was hung on a gibbet and his "execrable book" The Rights of Man was ceremoniously burnt. His chest tomb survives in Silverton churchyard, next to the west door of the church, inscribed as follows: Underneath are deposited the mortal remains of Thomas Langford Brown Esqr. (of Comb Satchfield in this parish) who died January 27th 1833 aged 71 years. Following the death in 1831 of Dorothy Ayre Taylor (Mrs Brown), the widow of Henry Langford Brown, he succeeded to the reversion under the will of his father or uncle. Combe Satchfield was sold, apparently in 1831, to George Wyndham, 4th Earl of Egremont (1786–1845), of Orchard Wyndham, Somerset, lord of the manor of Silverton. Thomas I Langford Brown had at least three sons:

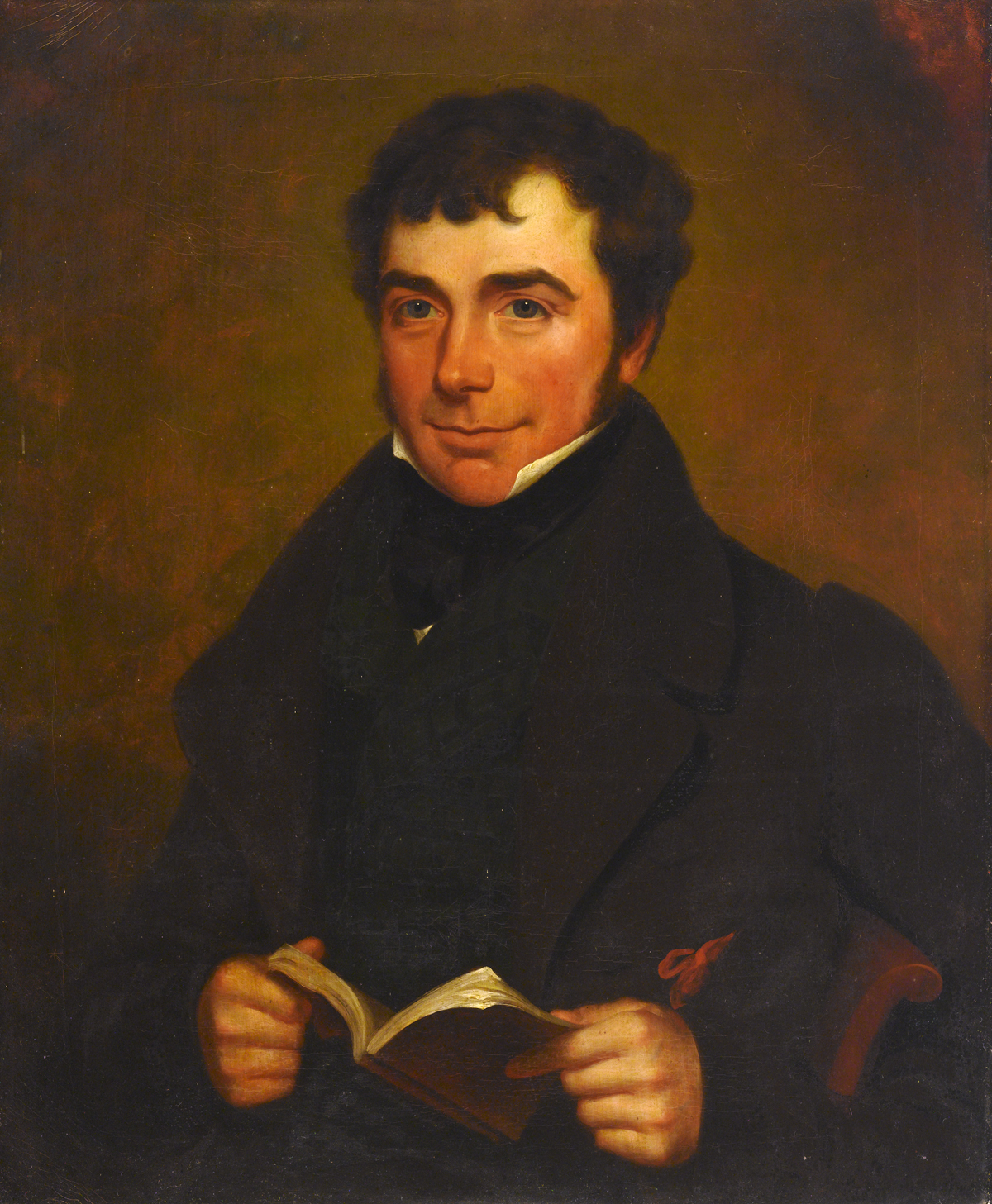
Portrait of Henry II Langford Brown (1802–1857), by Richard Augustus Clack (1804–1881), Royal Albert Memorial Museum, Exeter, donated in 1957 by Thomas Hercules Langford Brown

- Henry II Langford Brown (1802–1857), eldest son and heir, who abandoned Combe Satchfield and moved to his other manor of Kingskerswell where at a cost of £10,000 he built in the 1830s a neo-Tudor country house called Barton Hall, near Torquay, which was more conveniently located for his interest in Yachting. On arrival back in the harbour of Torquay he is said to have been in the habit of firing a cannon to summon his coach to collect him. Barton Hall burned down in 1862 but was immediately rebuilt, during which time the family lived at nearby Fluder House. Barton Hall estate was inherited in 1936 by Thomas Hercules Langford Brown and was requisitioned during World War II by the Fire Service and then by the Civil Defence. It was returned to Brown in a dilapidated state, whereupon it was sold to a group of Torquay Businessmen, including a Mr Liddell, who turned it into a holiday centre. It was acquired in 1957 by Fred Pontin who made it the flagship of his Pontins holiday camp empire, and later was acquired by the "3D Education & Adventure" group. In 1957 Thomas Hercules Langford Brown donated two family portraits of Henry I Langford Brown and Henry II Langford Brown to the Royal Albert Memorial Museum in Exeter.
- Thomas II Langfield Brown (1804–1849), buried in the chest tomb of Thomas I Langford Brown, Silverton churchyard
- Edwin Langford Brown (1810–1849), buried in the chest tomb of Thomas I Langford Brown, Silverton churchyard

== Manor of Silverton ==
During the reign of Henry IV (1399–1413) the manor of Silverton was purchased by the Justice of the Common Pleas Sir John Wadham of Edge in Branscombe, Devon ancestor of John Wadham (d.1578) of Merryfield in Ilton, Somerset, the father of Florence Wadham wife of Sir John Wyndham (d.1572) of Orchard Wyndham, Somerset and sister of Nicholas Wadham (1531/1532–1609), founder of Wadham College, Oxford. It was bought partly from Sir John Meriet and partly from Phillipa, widow of Matthew Courtenay. From the Wadham family it was eventually inherited by Sir John Wyndham (1558–1645), of Orchard Wyndham, ancestor of the Earls of Egremont.

== Construction ==
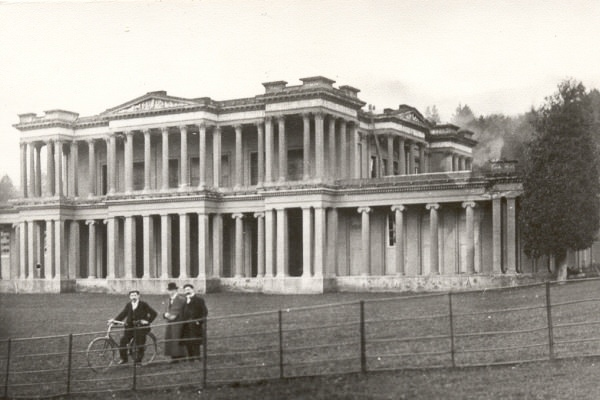
Pre-1901 photograph of Silverton Park, south front viewed from the south-east. The holly tree survives today on the site now overgrown with mature trees

Having inherited the Egremont earldom but not the great Egremont seat of Petworth House in Sussex, the 4th Earl determined to rival Petworth with a house of his own. His architect was James Thomas Knowles who provided him with 187 rooms, occupying one acre of ground. and was constructed in brick with a render of patented metallic cement. A frieze depicting the Exodus of the Israelites into Egypt was sculpted on the cornice. When the earl died in 1845 without progeny, the interior of the house was incomplete and was never subsequently finished. His eventual heir to Silverton and to the more ancient Wyndham estate of Orchard Wyndham in Somerset, was his distant cousin William VI Wyndham (1834–1914) of Dinton House in Wiltshire.

== Demolition ==
The house's contents were sold in 1892 and it was demolished in 1901. The demolition was described as follows by the Devon Weekly Times newspaper, 15 November 1901, under the headline "DEVON MANSION BLOWN UP":

"Egremont House situated about half a mile from Silverton, stands on an acre of ground. It has 150 rooms and has been unoccupied for more than 40 years. It was built 60 years ago by Lord Egremont, who only occupied it for about four years, when he died without seeing the completion of the massive undertaking. The place has been the scene of a great deal of interest for some months past. To complete the structure a fortune would have to be spent, and as a result it has fallen into the hands of Messrs. Atkins and Taylor of Exeter, who are demolishing it and making what money they can out of the materials. Handsome marble mantelpieces have fetched nearly £50 each. Messrs. Atkins and Taylor, on Wednesday, blew up the front of the house with dynamite. A large number of people were present, including several photographers. The blasting was timed for 3 o'clock. It was twenty minutes to four, however, before the twenty-odd charges of dynamite laid within and around some of the foundation pillars were declared ready to be fired. The crowd which had congregated around the mansion as soon as the word was given that the preparations were perfected, scattered to right and left, and formed a ring around the mansion where they stood in wonderment, and it was hoped in safety, to watch the impending catastrophe, by which the front of the great mansion passed suddenly from the view. A trying scene followed. At a given signal a workman lighted the end of each fuse simultaneously and then hurried from the spot to await events. Instead of the whole pile taking an upward flight, as many expected, nothing resulted from the effort, further than some four or five sharp cracks, a spit of fire, and the detachment of some blocks of masonry. Some of the dynamite charges had not exploded and others had misspent. Interest in the event waned and excitement died down at this palpable failure. But the telling trial was yet to be consummated. After a sufficient wait, the workmen cautiously crept back to the building, recharged the orifices with dynamite and again ignited the fuses, retiring as before to a safe distance. Presently the crack of artillery was heard, smoke issued in puffs from different parts of the mansion and presently one pillar after another fell to the ground with a resounding crash, and from the debris ascended clouds of dust which could have been seen for miles around. A gloomy place before, it now looked the acme of desolation when the dust and smoke had sufficiently cleared to give a view of it. The housebreakers and staff had done their best, but their best was not quite good enough, for parts of the mansion still remained intact. The third attempt which immediately followed, though it dislodged more of the building, miscarried in its full purpose, but the place was fairly knocked to pieces. Messrs, Taylor and Atkins will probably bring their smashing operations to a final close a few days later."

== Surviving stable block ==
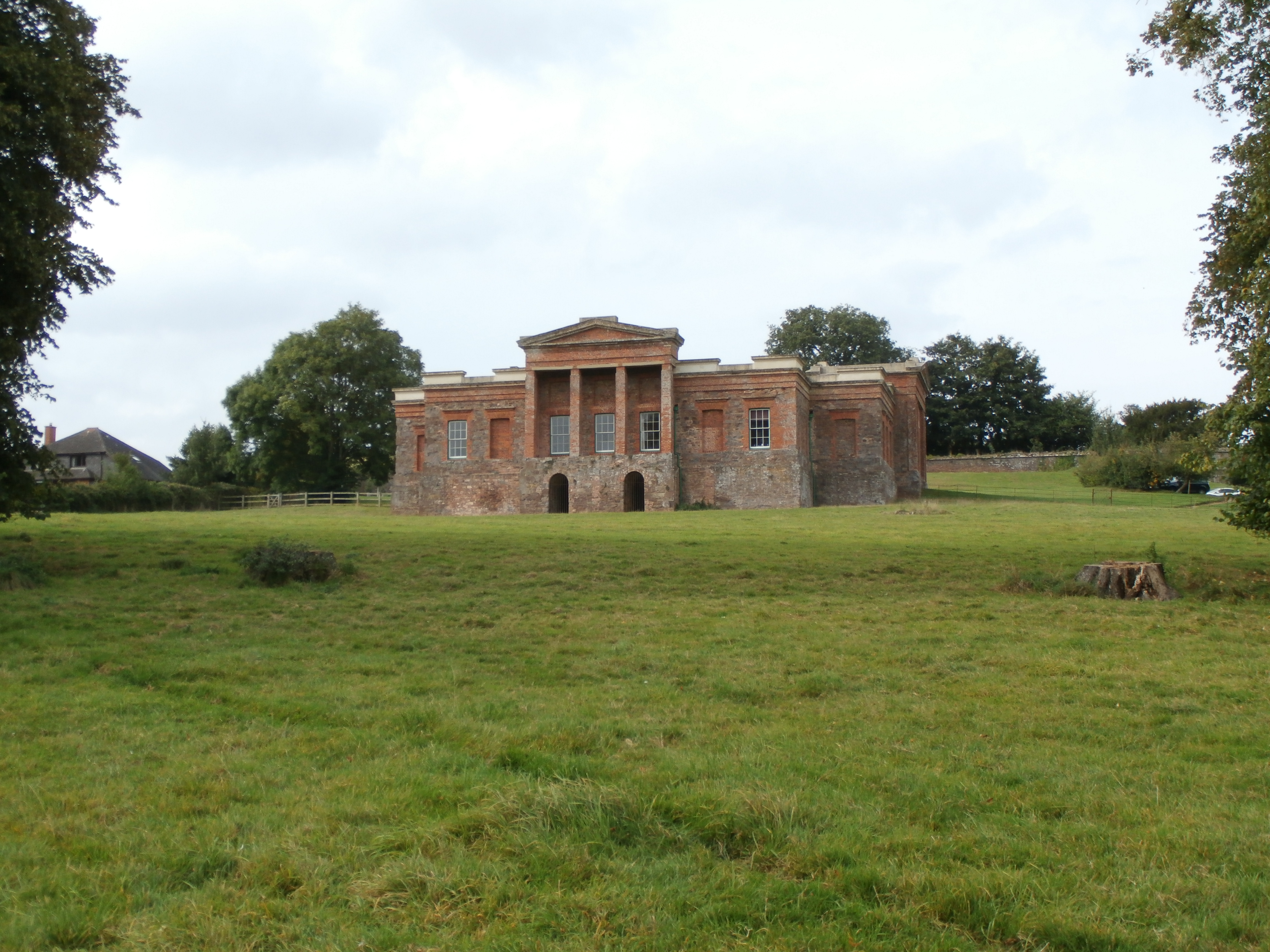
Surviving stable block, situated about 200 yards west of demolished mansion house

The surviving stable block, is according to Pevsner and Cherry (1991) a "monumental pedimented composition around a courtyard" built "in a severely Grecian style" (Pevsner, 1952). It is the only surviving remnant of the house and was acquired in 1987 by Sir John Smith, founder of the Landmark Trust who sought to prevent it being converted into flats. In 2004, with the financial assistance of a private donor, the Landmark Trust started its restoration for use as self-catering holiday accommodation, completed in 2008.

== Nefarious use of sale catalogue ==
The art forger Shaun Greenhalgh and his father acquired a copy of the 1892 sale catalogue and used the un-illustrated catalogue descriptions to recreate items, for which the catalogue was used to provide spurious provenances. Their most notorious forgery supported by this false provenance was the so-called "Amarna Princess", made in the Amarna art style of ancient Egypt, which they sold in 2003 to Bolton Museum for £440,000, but were subsequently unmasked as forgers.
