= Historic estates in Swimbridge parish =

The lord of the manor of Swimbridge in Devon, England, until the 20th century was the Duke of Bedford, of Woburn Abbey in Bedfordshire and of Endsleigh Cottage in Devon, whose ancestor John Russell, 1st Earl of Bedford (c.1485–1555) of Chenies in Buckinghamshire and of Bedford House in Exeter, Devon, was appointed Lord Lieutenant of Devon by King Henry VIII and obtained large grants of land in that county following the Dissolution of the Monasteries. Thus there is no manor house in Swimbridge as the lord was non-resident. The location of the court house where manorial business was transacted may have been Ernesborough.

== Dennington ==
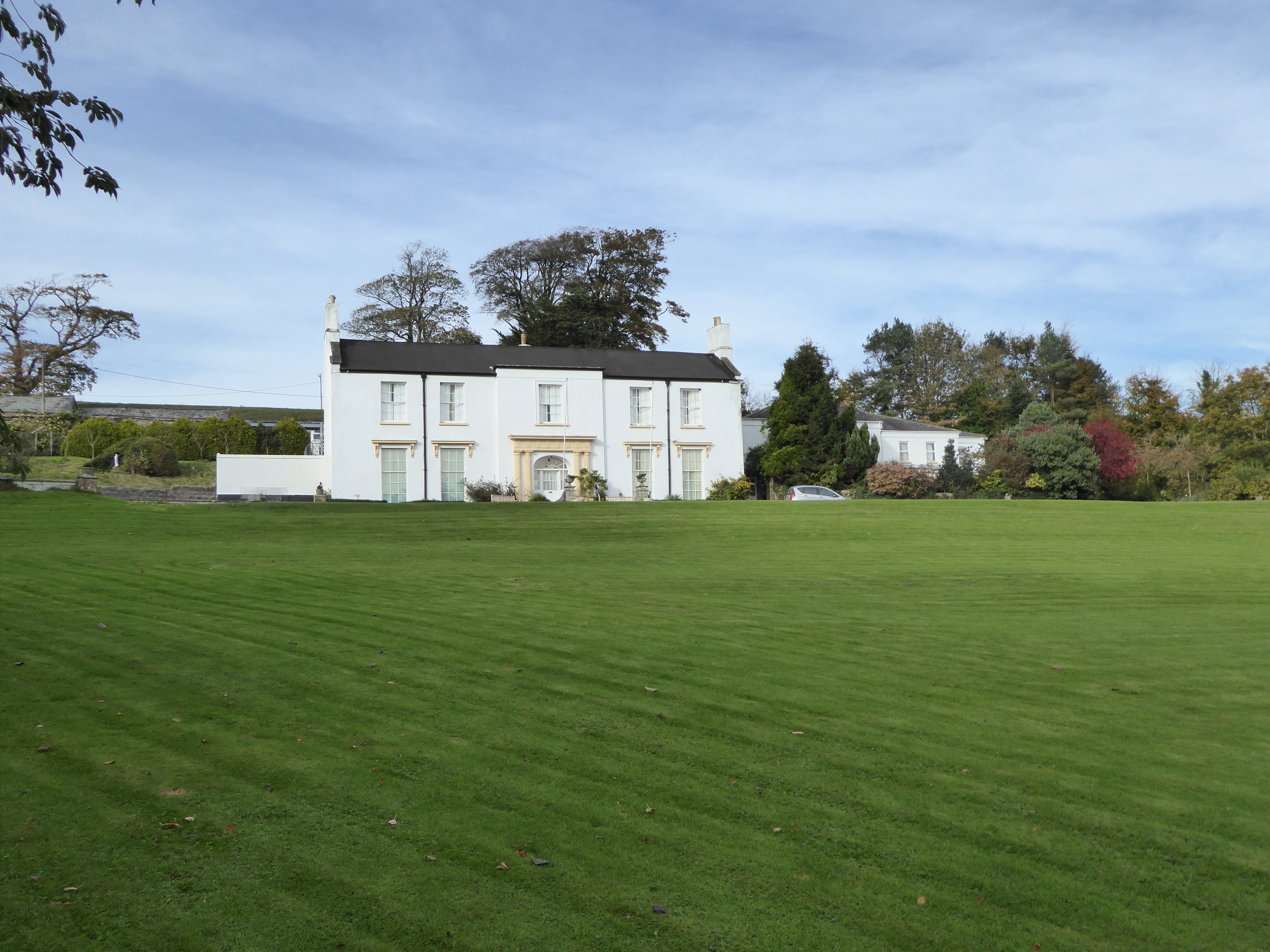
Dennington House in 2018

Monument to Charles Cutcliffe (d.1670), Swimbridge Church. It names his mother as Elianorae Chichester e Dinnyton. It is unusual, if not unique, in incorporating an oil painting of the deceased, probably by James Gandy (1619–89), a pupil of Vandyke. The heraldic cartouches on either side have been re-affixed upside-down

Portrait of Charles Cutcliffe (d.1670), Swimbridge Church, probably by James Gandy (1619–89), a pupil of Vandyke

Dennington (modern spelling) was a seat of the Chichester family, a branch of that family seated originally at Raleigh, Pilton, with a later major branch at Hall, Bishop's Tawton. (Not to be confused with nearby Dinnaton Barton, Swimbridge, 3/4 mile to S-E, a 19th-century model farm built in 1853 by the 7th Duke of Bedford). The notable mural monument to Charles Cutcliffe (d.1670) survives in Swimbridge Church, on the east wall of the North Aisle Chapel, inscribed:

Carolus filius Johannis Cutcliffe ar(migeri) e Dammage et Elianorae Chichester e Dinnyton huius parochiae caelestis anima nunquam habitavit pulchriore domicilio narcet ganymed fictiunculae solus hic noster flos et deliciae juventutis ostendit vis divina quid potuit et volvit tace. (Added later at bottom:) Christian his sister wife of Henry Chichester of Stowford, Gent., was buried ye 14 of June 1721 aged 51.

Which may be translated thus:

"Charles, son of John Cutcliffe, Esquire, of Damage, and of Elianor Chichester of Dennington of this parish. Never a heavenly soul inhabited a more beautiful home, this our flower and darling of youth, only Narcissus and Ganymede of trifling tales. Divine power showed what it was able and rolled. Be silent."

Charles Cutcliffe was buried at Swimbridge on 17 November 1670. He was the eldest son of John Cutcliffe (1632–1696), of Damage in the parish of Mortehoe near Ilfracombe, buried at Ilfracombe, by his wife Eleanor Chichester (1629–1681), daughter of Tristram Chichester of Hearsdon, in the parish of Swimbridge, and co-heiress of her brother Tristram Chichester, whose monument with sculpted bust survives in Swimbridge Church. Her large mural monument survives in Holy Trinity Church, Ilfracombe. Monuments of two of Eleanor's children survive in Swimbridge Church: Charles Cutcliffe (d.1670), and his sister Christiana Cutcliffe (d.1721), wife of Henry Chichester of Stowford in the parish of Swimbridge.

Hoskins (1954) remarked "Notice the monument to Charles son of John Cutcliffe of Damage (1670), surmounted by a beautiful oval portrait in oils which has been attributed to Lely but is more probably the work of James Gandy (1619–89), a pupil of Vandyke".

Dennington House was later the residence of Richard Incledon-Bury (1757–1825), heir of Vice-Admiral Thomas Bury, Royal Navy, lord of the manor of Colleton, Chulmleigh in Devon, and third son of Chichester Incledon (1715–1771) of Barnstaple, a junior branch of the ancient gentry family of Incledon of Incledon, later of Buckland House, both in the parish of Braunton, Devon. As required under the terms of his inheritance, he assumed the surname of Bury. He married his second cousin Jane Chichester, second daughter of Charles Chichester of Hall, Bishop's Tawton. His daughter and heiress Penelope Incledon-Bury, in 1836 at Swimbridge, married the famous fox-hunting Parson Jack Russell (1795–1883), Rector of Black Torrington and Vicar of Swimbridge, who invented the Jack Russell Terrier. Russell lived both at Dennington and at Tordown House, also within the parish. From 1985 to the present (2018) Dennington House has been used as a residential rehabilitation centre supporting men with recovery from alcohol addiction, trading as "Francis House", part of Assisi Community Care.

== Stowford ==
Stowford is the traditional birthplace of Saint Hieritha, an Anglo-Saxon Christian lady martyred at nearby Chittlehampton in the 8th century. Many centuries later it was a seat of the Chichester family. Surviving in Swimbridge Church is a monument to Christiana Cutcliffe (d.1721), wife of Henry Chichester (d.1730) of Stowford, a daughter of John Cutcliffe (1632–1696) of Damage in the parish of Mortehoe near Ilfracombe, Devon, by his wife Eleanor Chichester (1629–31 March 1681), a daughter of Tristram Chichester of Hearsdon, Swimbridge, and co-heiress of her brother Tristram Chichester (1624–1654), whose monument is in Swimbridge Church. Eleanor's large mural monument survives in Holy Trinity Church, Ilfracombe. Also surviving in Ilfracombe Church is the monument to John Cutcliffe's parents, namely Charles Cutcliffe (1577 – Oct 1637) of Damage and Grace Chichester (d.Nov.1637), a daughter of John Chichester of Hall, Bishop's Tawton, about 2 miles west of Stowford.

== Hearsdon ==
Mural monument in St James' Church, Swimbridge, to the third Tristram Chichester (1624–1654) of Hearsdon

Monument in Holy Trinity Church, Ilfracombe, Devon, to Elionor Chichester (1629–1681), wife of John Cutcliffe (1632–1696) of Damage in the parish of Morthoe, near Ilfracombe, and daughter of Tristram Chichester of Hearsdon in the parish of Swimbridge, Devon, and co-heiress of her brother Tristram Chichester (1624–1654), of Hearsdon, whose monument is in Swimbridge Church

Hearsdon, within the parish of Swimbridge, was anciently a "mansion" and a seat of the Chichester family. A mural monument survives in St James' Church, Swimbridge, to Tristram Chichester (1624–1654) of Hearsdon. He was the second son of Tristram Chichester (1595–1672) (the son of Tristram Chichester (1568–1642) of Hearsdon by his wife Christiana Handford (d.1651) of "Dynnington" in the parish of Swimbridge) by his wife Eleanor (of family unknown) (1603–1647), and was descended from the prominent Chichester family of Hall in the adjoining parish of Bishop's Tawton, itself a junior branch of Chichester of Raleigh, Pilton, near Barnstaple. He married a wife unknown by whom he had four daughters, mentioned in his will but not by name. The monument displays at the bottom the arms of Chichester (with crescent for difference of a second son), impaling the arms of his wife (Sable, a fess vair) and the two arms again on separate shields. Partly behind his head on a smaller shield appear the arms of Chichester impaling: Paly of six argent and gules, on a chief of the second three mascles conjoined in fess of the first (unknown family).

The top inscription is as follows:

"Tristram the sonn of Tristram Chichester of this parish, Gent., was here interred the 30th day of March 1654 aetatis suae 30" (i.e. "of his age 30")

The central panel contains the following verse under the line Defunctus ad viatorem ("Dead man to traveller"):

Stay thou that passest by look here & see,
An image of thine own mortalitie,
If genteel birth or youth or the loud call,
Of friends could have repreiv'd me I had all,
But sith nor these nor many helps beside,
Could sheild me from that stroak wherof I dy'de,
Be thou admonish'd so to watch and ward,
That death may not assail thee unprepar'd

He has long hair and wears the dress of a puritan of the Commonwealth period. His right elbow rests on a skull, a vanitas reference. Pevsner described this monument as "frontal demi-figure, cheek in hand, in an oval niche; deplorably bad". The artistically acclaimed monument to his nephew Charles Cutcliffe (d.1670), survives in the North Aisle Chapel (see under Dennington). The large and elaborate monument to his sister Eleanor Chichester (1629–1681) (mother of Charles Cutcliffe (d.1670)) survives in Ilfracombe Church.

== Ernsborough ==
Ernsborough is an ancient Saxon estate within the parish of Swimbridge occupied in the 14th and 15th centuries by the Mules family, descended from Baron Moels of North Cadbury in Somerset.

== Bydown ==
Bydown House, west front, in 2018

Bydown House, south front, in 2018

"Bydown, Swimbridge, Devon", painting by George Moor, English Native School, 19th century

The estate of Bydown, within the parish of Swimbridge, was in ancient times owned by the Mayne and Chichester families. The surviving Bydown House is a grade II* listed country house built by the Nott family in 1798 as the surviving datestone states, or between 1820–30 as Pevsner suggests. It was described by Pevsner as "a trim neo-Grecian mansion in a small park with two immaculate white stucco fronts". Between the lower storey windows is a small inscribed tablet inscribed "1759, J Nott", with the arms of Nott, reset on the new house. It remained in the ownership of the Nott family until about 1925.

=== Nott ===
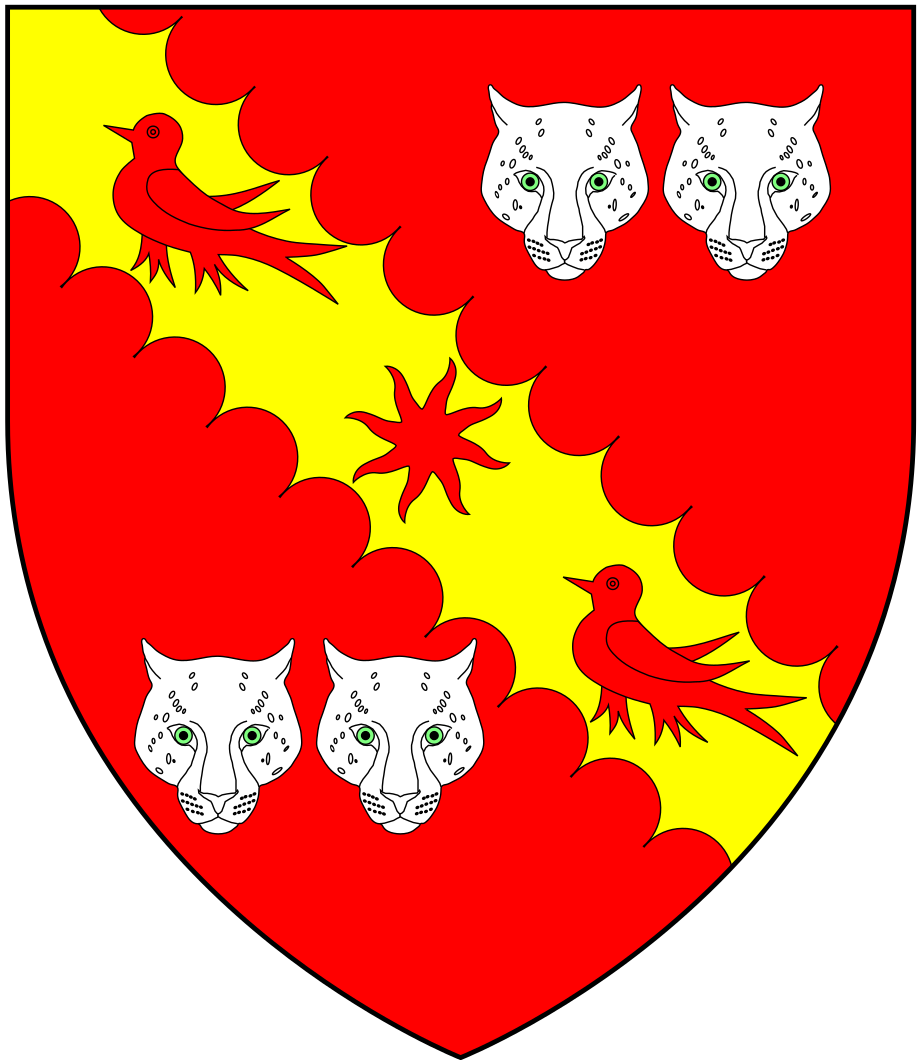
Arms of Nott: Gules, on a bend engrailed or between four leopard's faces two and two argent an estoile of eight points between two martlets of the first

The Nott family was previously resident at Torrdown within the parish, as mentioned in an announcement in Trewman's Exeter Flying Post 19 October 1809: "To be Let for the Term of 14 years, from Lady-day next, a Dwelling-House, with suitable outhouses, and about 140 acres of exceeding good arable meadow, pasture, and orchard land, parts and parcels of all those messuages and tenements, called Torrdown, situate and lying in the parish of Swimbridge, in the county of Devon, lately occupied by James Nott, Esq. deceased. These premises have been for a long period in the possession of the proprietors." In 1902 the owner of Tordown was Frederick Richard Harding-Nott, Esq. The Notts also owned West Cobbaton, in Swimbridge, formerly owned by the Bury family, and from the 16th century were substantial yeomen in the parish. in 1523 a certain John Nott was a party to a conveyance of land within the parish of Swimbridge. Cobbaton passed on the marriage Mary Nott to her husband William Thorne, and her Thorne descendants held it until after 1902. After the building of Bydown House Trewman's dated 27 November 1834 announced the death of "Mr John Nott at Denniton in the parish of Swimbridge, aged 69".

==== John Nott (1769–1808) ====
1798 datestone, wall of inner hall of Bydown House, showing arms of Nott in centre, with (clockwise from left): Berry, Bellew, Harvey, Wyatt and Mules. Latin inscription below: J.N. AEDIFICAVIT 1798 ("John Nott built (it) (in) 1798")

John Nott (1769–1808) (son of James Nott (1726–1790) by his wife Emma Mules, a daughter of John Mules (a distant descendant of Baron Moels of North Cadbury, Somerset) of Ernesborough, Swimbridge) "of Bydown", married Susannah Norris, daughter and sole heiress of Richard Norris of South Molton. From his wife he inherited properties in Witheridge, Thelbridge, South Molton and Brendon. His elder brother, who died unmarried, was James Nott (d.1809) of Tordown, a Captain in the North Devon Yeomanry and lay rector of Swimbridge. His son and heir was John Nott (1805–1856), of Bydown, who died childless.

==== John Nott (1805–1856) ====
John Nott (1805–1856), of Bydown, son, was a magistrate for Devonshire and senior Captain in the Royal North Devon Yeomanry. He built Bydown House, probably between 1820 and 1830. His monument survives in Swimbridge Church in the form of an inscribed open book sculpted in marble, including the words: "A humble minded Christian and the friend of his poorer brethren". However, as the lessee of the great tithes of Swimbridge, in 1830 he refused to lower his tithe assessments during the Agrarian Riots caused by a poor harvest which had caused the price of bread to increase to levels unaffordable by many agricultural labourers. A mob marched against him to Bydown House "in order to seek relief and give John Nott a bloody shirt". In 1841 he was found guilty of non-payment of the poor rates and the Overseer of the Poor obtained a distress warrant for £24-6s–8d against his property. He developed a bad relationship with Rev. Jack Russell, the famous fox-hunting vicar of Swimbridge, who deemed him "a little less than generous to the poor" and in turn Nott criticised him for bad conduct in his ministry, and made a formal complaint to the Bishop of Exeter. In 1840, as part of his case, Nott obtained sworn evidence from a certain "J.H." (John Huxtable) in Swimbridge, which was contrary to his role as a magistrate. Nott "had, of his own motion, administered oaths to John Huxtable and two other persons, touching the truth of certain statements affecting the character of Mr. Russell as a clergyman, which he had then transmitted to the Bishop of Exeter; at the same time urging the bishop to make inquiries into the conduct of Mr. Russell. The statements of the two other individual went to impute neglect of duty (neglecting to pray with a sick parishioner on a certain occasion, and to bury a child when called on); that of Huxtable merely indecorous language and demeanour". In 1842 he was prosecuted by the public prosecutor on 12 counts and was found guilty by a jury of the misdemeanour of unlawfully administering oaths. Russell sued Nott for libel, and won damages in a case which was sensational. However Russell was magnanimous and refused to allow the church bells to be rung for his victory lest "any demonstration...might offend the feelings of the defeated". A mystery survives today as to the reason for the partial erasing of wording on Nott's monument in the church: "May our name as his, be written in the Book of Life", where the words "as his" have been partially erased.

Nott certainly attempted to make amends for his past unpopular behaviour. In 1854 "John Nott, Esq., of Swimbridge, has most kindly given to all the poor in receipt of parochial relief a week's pay in addition to the sum which they are receiving". He died at Bydown on 11 March 1856. On 16 April 1856 his executors sold the livestock of his estate at Rowley in the Parish of Paracombe, transported to Bydown for better market access, including: "Pure North Devon Stock, Agricultural Implements, Dairy Utensils &c., &c., 77 Bullocks and Yearlings, 315 Couple of Ewes and Lambs, 123 Ewe and Wether Hoggerals and Rams, 21 Horses and Ponies, 12 Pigs". John Nott died childless, when his sisters Elizabeth and Marianne became his co-heirs. In 1838 Elizabeth Nott had married Rev. John Pyke, and her son John Nott Pyke, became the heir to Bydown. His other heir to part of his property (under an entail created by the will of his grandfather James Nott (d.1790)) was Rev. R. Harding, grandson of R. Harding and his wife Agnes Nott. In 1902 the owner of Tordown was Frederick Richard Harding-Nott, Esq.

=== Pyke-Nott ===
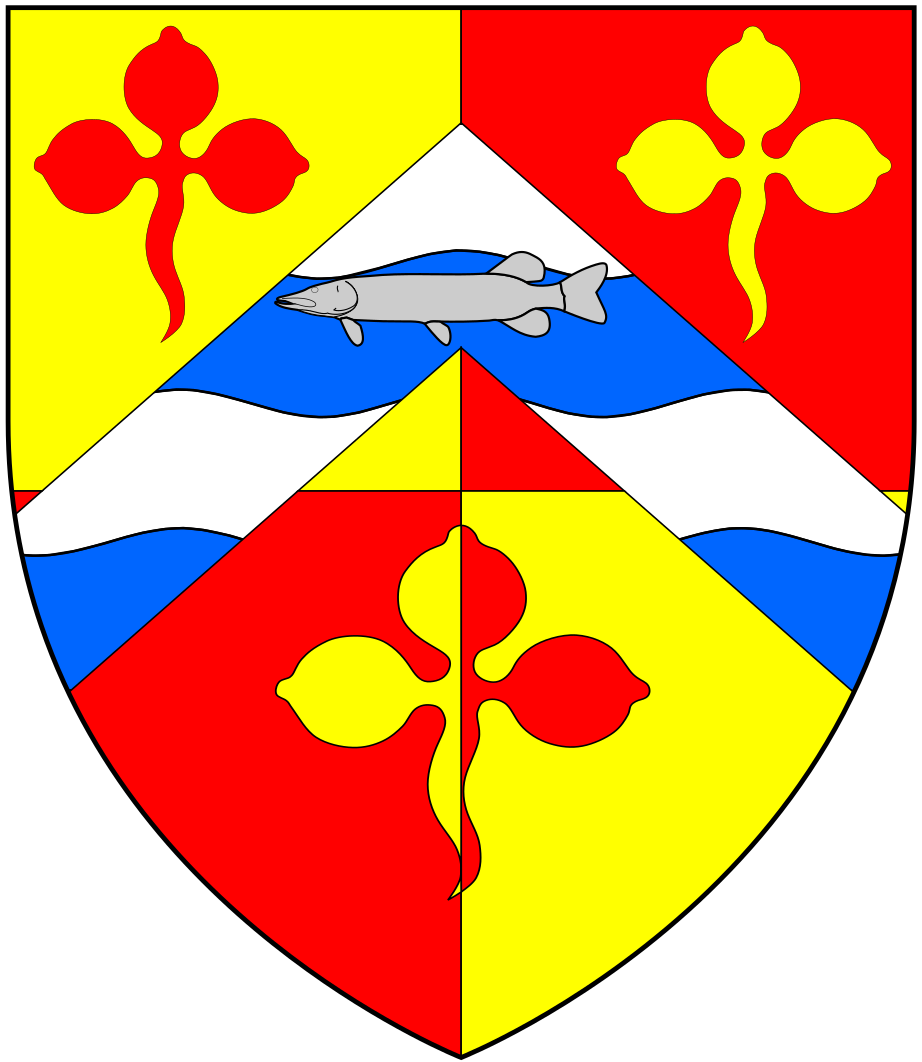
Canting arms of Pyke: Quarterly or and gules, on a chevron barry wavy of four argent and azure between two trefoils in chief and another in base counterchanged a pike naiant proper

==== John Nott Pyke-Nott (1841–1920) ====
John Nott Pyke (1841–1920) (son of the Rev. John Pyke of Parracombe, Rector of Parracombe, patron of the living, and lord of the manor of Parracombe) was the nephew and heir of John Nott of Bydown. He was educated at Eton College and Exeter College, Oxford and was an amateur playwright. In 1862 the tenant of Bydown House was J. G. Maxwell, Esq. In 1863 John Nott Pyke received royal licence to assume the additional surname of Nott, in compliance with the will of his uncle. He thus became "John Nott Pyke-Nott". In 1867 he married Caroline Isabella Ward, a writer and a daughter of Frederick Ward. His children included his heir John Moels Pyke-Nott (born 1868) and a daughter Isabel Codrington Pyke-Nott (1874–1943) a painter known as "Isabel Codrington".

In 1869 he was described as "a large landowner in North Devon". In August 1869 his 24 year old younger brother James Nott Pyke, of Parracombe, then an undergraduate at Exeter College, Oxford, was killed by a friend in a rabbit shooting accident near Bydown. In 1883 the family moved to London. In 1902 the tenant of Bydown House was Thomas Frederick Parkinson, Esq.

==== John Moels Pyke-Nott (born 1868) ====
John Moels Pyke-Nott (born 1868), son, of Bydown House, who succeeded his father in 1920. In 1894 he married Dora Florence Geraldine Langton, 3rd daughter of Bennet Langton of Langton Hall in Lincolnshire. John Pyke-Nott sold Bydown at some time before 1937, when his residence was Mill House, Dumbleton, Evesham, Worcestershire. During WW II (1939–45) Bydown House was used as a refugee hostel for Jewish children.
