= Islandmagee witch trial =

Criminal trials in Carrickfergus in 1711

Coordinates: 54.816358°N 5.727437°W

- Part of witch trials in the early modern period
- Aerial photograph of Islandmagee's coast in 2019
- Date: March 31 – September 11, 1711
- Location: Kilcoan More, Islandmagee (today part of Northern Ireland)
- Deaths: 1 (Mary Dunbar, the accuser)
- Accused: 8 women and 1 man from Islandmagee's Presbyterian Ulster Scots community
- Charges: Causing injury or material loss by witchcraft (first trial); Causing death by witchcraft (second trial)
- Sentence: One year's imprisonment and time in the pillory (first trial); Possible execution (second trial)

The Islandmagee witch trials occurred in Carrickfergus in March and September 1711. A total of nine defendants were found guilty of witchcraft at nearby Islandmagee over the course of two trials, in what proved to be the final witch trials held in Ireland.

== Background ==
=== Sociopolitical context ===
The events occurred in Islandmagee, a civil parish and eight-mile-long peninsula on the east coast of County Antrim, Ulster. Protestant settlers from England and Scotland had begun arriving in Ireland after 1607 as part of an organised colonisation termed the Plantation of Ulster. The settlement of Antrim was a private endeavour, sponsored by Scottish landowner Randal MacDonnell, 1st Earl of Antrim, that ran parallel to the Plantation. By the time of the trials in 1711, Islandmagee had a population of around 300 Presbyterian Protestants of Scottish origin, to which the accusers and accused in the Islandmagee trials belonged.

Ireland's native Irish-speaking Catholics did not typically believe in witches, partly because Irish folklore already provided myriad supernatural causes for misfortunes, such as the aos sídhe. The Irish population also possessed a lower literacy rate than mainland Britain and imported few theological or philosophical books from Europe, where witch trials were more prevalent. Ulster Scots were therefore far likelier to fear witches, although the sceptical juries they encountered in Ireland made prosecutions rare. Only nine witch trials are known to have occurred in Ireland during the early modern period; in Scotland, as many as 1,500 accused witches were executed.

=== Contemporary accounts of events ===
The 1711 account of an anonymous witness is the fullest contemporary record of the first trial; it also describes events that took place just before the second. The document, though no longer extant, was preserved in reprints of a local history by historian Samuel McSkimin. Its text was made publicly available in 2022 by historians Shannon Devlin and Andrew Sneddon.

Another contemporary record, albeit with less detail, was penned by Reverend William Tisdall, a Church of Ireland vicar and anti-Presbyterian commentator who attended the first trial. His letter, dated 4 April 1711, was reprinted in Walker's Hibernian Magazine in 1775. In 1896, academic Robert Magill Young published Historical Notices of Old Belfast and Its Vicinity, a collection of primary sources from events in Ulster. The book contains the depositions of several trial witnesses as recorded by the Carrickfergus Assizes.

== Allegations ==
Alleged paranormal activity began at the residence of James Haltridge, in the town of Kilcoan More, Islandmagee. He shared his home, Knowehead House, with his wife and two young children, as well as his mother, Ann Haltridge (also recorded as Anne). James' father and Ann's husband, Presbyterian minister Reverend John Haltridge, had died in 1697.

=== Experiences attributed to Ann Haltridge ===
According to narratives of the time, an unseen entity reportedly began to harass Ann Haltridge in September 1710. It pelted her with stones and turf while she sat beside the kitchen fire or lay in bed, and stole her clothing and pillow at night. It stopped only once she moved to another bedroom.

The narrative relates that on 11 December, a dark-haired boy, who appeared to be between the ages of ten and twelve, entered the kitchen while Ann was by the fire. Ann asked where he came from and whether he was hungry, but the boy ignored her, instead dancing around the room. He then bolted from the house, and although Ann sent servants to chase him around the premises, he eluded them at every turn. The incident ended when James Haltridge's dog entered the courtyard, signalling that James was on his way home, prompting a servant to call after the boy that the house's master would soon arrive to catch him. The boy supposedly vanished into thin air.

According to the story, no further strange activity occurred until 11 February, when Ann's book of religious sermons went missing after she briefly put it down. She searched the house to no avail. A young servant named Margaret Spear said the mysterious boy reappeared the next day, holding Ann's book and a sword. Spear watched as he smashed two windows, then threatened to kill the house's occupants. He claimed the Devil had taught him to read, and could transform him into an animal small enough to bypass any door. With the sword, he dug a small hole outside the house, describing it as “a grave for a corpse which will come out of [the] house very soon.” The tale alleges he finally left by appearing to fly over the hedge.

On 15 February, clothing on Ann Haltridge's bed was mysteriously lain out in the shape of a person on the floor. By now, rumours of bizarre events at Knowehead House had begun circulating locally, prompting Presbyterian minister Robert Sinclair to attend the house and spend a night praying with the family. Ann tried to retire to bed in the evening, only to scream at midnight as if in pain, attracting Sinclair's attention. She told him she felt like a knife had pierced her back, and the pain continued to plague her until 22 February, when she died.

=== Allegations by Mary Dunbar ===
On 27 February, Mary Dunbar, James Haltridge's 18-year-old cousin from a gentry family in Castlereagh, County Down, journeyed with her mother, James' sister, to stay with the grieving family. James himself was away in Dublin at the time of their arrival.

On her first night at Knowehead House, Mary Dunbar found that someone had removed clothes from her trunk and scattered them throughout the property. The trail led to an apron that had been locked up in another room. It was twisted into five knots (or nine, according to trial observer Tisdall), which Dunbar unfastened them to find a flannel cap wrapped up in the centre. Both Dunbar and James' wife were frightened by the discovery, as the cap belonged to Ann and had been missing since her death.

Later that night, Dunbar twice experienced the symptoms of a seizure. She claimed to feel a knife cut through her thigh, and saw a vision of the eight women responsible for bewitching her. She gave a detailed physical description of each to local Presbyterian authorities, as well as the names she had overheard of all but one; the eighth woman went by the pseudonym "Mrs. Ann."

Throughout March, church authorities found women who matched Dunbar's descriptions and summoned them to participate in identity parades in Knowehead House. Dunbar successfully picked out each suspect. On one occasion, she suffered a fit while suspect Jane Latimer was approaching the house, seemingly unbeknownst to Dunbar. This, coupled with Dunbar's testimony, convinced Robert Sinclair and Church of Ireland curate David Robb to refer the case to the secular judiciary.

== March 1711 trial ==
By 24 March 1711, the Mayor of Carrickfergus had ordered the arrests of eight women: Janet Liston, Elizabeth Sellor, Catherine McCalmond and Janet Carson of Islandmagee, as well as Janet Main from Braid Island, Jane Latimer and Janet Millar of Carrickfergus, and Margaret Mitchell of Kilroot. Mitchell was arrested last, for she was identified as the tormentor who had gone by an alias, "Mrs. Ann", in Dunbar's vision. Dunbar was said to have described her in detail.

The accused, who were all Presbyterians with varying reputations but no criminal records, were tried on 31 March at the Carrickfergus Assizes before Justices Anthony Upton of the Common Pleas and James Macartney of the King's Bench. All pleaded not guilty. None were defended by lawyers at the trial, which lasted from six in the morning until two in the afternoon before a jury of twelve men.

Replica pillory in Carrickfergus, 2011.

Witnesses attested that Dunbar had suffered fits so violent that three men could not restrain her. Some had seen her vomit items, ranging from yarn to feathers, into her hands. Others said Dunbar had, at times, slid off her bed as if dragged, and her bedroom mysteriously smelt like brimstone if she tried to leave it. The court also heard that Dunbar had derived accurate physical descriptions of the accused from visions, all of whom she then identified in person.

Dunbar herself did not give evidence, as she was apparently rendered unable to speak the night before the trial. She fainted in the courtroom, and later alleged that she had received a vision of three new tormentors while proceedings were underway.

Summing up the evidence, Upton told the jurors that he was unconvinced of the defendants' guilt, as most were known to regularly attend church services. He also discouraged the jury from relying on Dunbar's claim that she had identified her tormentors by seeing them in a vision. Macartney, however, strongly suggested that the women were guilty, and the jury ultimately agreed. The eight defendants were sentenced to a year in prison and to stand four times in the pillory.

== September 1711 trial ==
Mary Dunbar continued to suffer from violent fits after the trial. On 1 April, two days after the trial, she resumed vomiting pins and feathers. Margaret Spear, the Haltridge family's servant, claimed to see an apparition the following day, and other occupants of the property heard strange noises throughout Knowehead House. They also observed stones being thrown by unseen entities.

Dunbar ultimately accused William Sellor, the alcoholic husband of Janet Liston and father of Elizabeth Sellor, of continuing his wife and daughter's sorcery. Soon after, in late April 1711, Dunbar died, and Sellor absconded to avoid arrest. Nonetheless, he was ultimately caught and charged with witchcraft.

Sellor was found guilty on 11 September 1711. Because Dunbar had died before his trial, it is possible that Sellor was sentenced to death. The Irish Witchcraft Act 1586, in force at the time, provided that convicted witches who caused injury would receive one year's imprisonment with time in the pillory, while those who caused death should be executed. Nonetheless, Sellor's ultimate fate is unknown. What became of the eight convicted women following their sentences is similarly absent from official records.

== Historical assessment ==
=== Profile of the accused ===
Historian Dr. Andrew Sneddon, described as the leading modern expert on the trials, compares contemporary descriptions of the accused with those of their accuser Mary Dunbar. Dunbar was described as an intelligent, pretty, and educated young gentlewoman. By contrast, the accused were all older women who were described as physically unattractive and dressed in shabby clothes, indicative of impoverished backgrounds. They would have made plausible witchcraft suspects for the time.

Many of the defendants also defied social norms in ways that would have made jurors likelier to withhold their sympathies. Catherine McCalmond was perhaps an atheist, which would have invited suspicion among Islandmagee's highly religious community; Janet Main possessed a "malicious temper" and little formal education. According to the anonymous witness who authored a full account of the first trial, at least two of the women, Janet Liston and her daughter Elizabeth Sellor, were rumoured to have been witches for "a great many years" before their arrest.

Some of the defendants possessed visible disabilities or unusual physical features. Elizabeth Sellor walked with a limp, while Janet Main's face bore smallpox scars. Janet Millar, who had suffered burns from a fire, was known to smoke a pipe, and had used profanity when she was arrested. Her experience of falling into a fire had also damaged her vision in one eye. Authorities used this trait to prosecute her, as Dunbar had similarly described one of her tormentors as blind in one eye. Janet Main's fingers were crooked and swollen, possibly arthritic; Dunbar's account of feeling gnarled hands tear her throat led to Main's arrest.

Author and journalist Martina Devlin assesses that Dunbar was "clearly attractive and very convincing" for people including William Tisdall to have noted her intelligence. The women that Dunbar accused were from comparatively "humbler [and] marginalised" backgrounds, undermining their credibility in favour of Dunbar.

=== Motivation of Dunbar and Spear ===
Sneddon believes that Mary Dunbar lied in order to achieve local fame and escape the "suffocating social constraints" put on women of the era. By feigning demonic possession, Dunbar could "misbehave without consequence, move from invisibility to notoriety [and] attack her elders at will". Devlin, as well as academics Robert Curran and Gregory Durston, suggest that Dunbar leveraged her education to draw from details of witch trials in Salem and Scotland. Curran highlights that some accusers in the Salem trials presented with similar symptoms to Dunbar, such as vomiting yarn and acting unusually in court. Devlin further notes that, at the time of the trials, it was unusual for people with Dunbar's education to accept the existence of witches as more than superstition.

Contributors to National Geographic's Witches: Truth Behind the Trials (2024), which covered the Islandmagee trials in its sixth episode, suggest that servant Margaret Spear may have been Dunbar's accomplice. She could have given Dunbar ideas for plausible local suspects; she may also have been enjoyed the attention she received by claiming to have personally interacted with the demonic young boy who tormented Ann Haltridge. Marie Cassidy, a pathologist who investigated the trials in 2026, concludes that Mary Dunbar was "impressionable" given her age, and may have been influenced to target women who were already known to the community as "nonconforming."

=== Medical explanations ===
Some analysts have attributed Mary Dunbar's behaviour to health conditions. Writer Richard Hayward suggests that her accusations were the product of mental illness. Cassidy, noting that visitors to Dunbar detected the smell of sulphur in her bedroom, posits that Dunbar may have been suffering from hydrogen sulphide poisoning. Stagnant water in nearby wells may have produced the toxic gas, which can trigger delusions and hallucinations. According to Cassidy, the descriptions of Dunbar's fits are also consistent with authentic epileptic seizures; her epilepsy may have ultimately caused her death soon after the first trial.

=== Political and religious division ===
At the time of the trials, County Antrim housed two competing factions divided along religious and political lines. Presbyterians, who supported Mary Dunbar's accusations, were affiliated with the Whig party, while Anglican sceptics, who viewed the Presbyterians as a political threat, were affiliated with the Tory party. Indeed, historian Sneddon points out that, of the trial's two judges, Tory affiliate Anthony Upton was more dubious of Dunbar's claims than Whig colleague James Macartney.

Nonetheless, Anglican minister William Tisdall, who attended the trial and commented on proceedings in a letter the following month, described Dunbar as a credible witness, and disagreed with Upton's reasoning as to why the accused were unlikely to be witches. Robert Curran takes the view that Tisdall's account is "honest and balanced", despite Tisdall's distrust of Presbyterians.

=== Myths and misconceptions ===
According to the 1823 edition of Samuel McSkimin's local history, one of the women allegedly lost her eye when a mob pelted them with boiled eggs and cabbage stalks. However, Andrew Sneddon points out that this book, published over a century after the trial, itself marked the first time this claim was committed in writing. Sneddon therefore concludes that McSkimin's account of one woman losing an eye is not based on evidence.

== Memorial ==
In 2014, journalist Martina Devlin, who wrote a novel inspired by the case, proposed installing a memorial to the convicted women. Traditional Unionist Voice councillor Jack McKee objected to a plaque on the grounds that it could become a "shrine to paganism". He was also unconvinced of the women's innocence, and believed the proposal to be "anti-god".

A plaque was eventually unveiled by Mid and East Antrim Borough Council at The Gobbins visitor centre in March 2023. The proposed line, "Today the community recognises your innocence" was omitted from its inscription after Ulster Unionist Party councillor Keith Turner objected that it was ultra vires for the council to make such a claim and it should "let visitors decide themselves".

== In the media ==
=== Literature ===
W. B. Yeats briefly described the trial in his 1888 anthology, Fairy and Folk Tales of the Irish Peasantry, drawing upon the account of Samuel McSkimin.

Writer and journalist Martina Devlin based her 2014 novel, The House Where It Happened, on the case. It presents a fictionalised account of the case's events from the perspective of a servant.

=== Witches of Islandmagee Project ===
Historians Andrew Sneddon and Victoria McCollum maintain the Witches of Islandmagee Project, housed at Ulster University. The multimedia initiative that tracks and adapts their ongoing analysis of the 1711 trials. The project has also spawned several adaptations of the trial records, including:

- The Witches of Islandmagee: A Graphic Novel (2023), illustrated by David Campbell,
- Demonised: Bewitched and Possessed (2023), a virtual reality game that places users in the position of one of the accused, and
- 1711 Ireland: A Witch's Fate (2025), a video game for PC that follows a contemporary investigator's efforts to discern the truth of the alleged crimes.

=== Television ===
Dr. Marie Cassidy, an academic and pathologist, presented a documentary entitled Dr Marie Cassidy Investigates Ireland’s Last Witch Trial, broadcast on RTÉ One in October 2026.

== See also ==
- Florence Newton, the "witch of Youghal" tried in 1661
