= James Macartney (died 1727) =

- Born: 1651–3
- Died: 16 December 1727; London
- Occupations: Lawyer, judge and Politician
- Father: George Macartney

James Macartney (c.1651/3–16 December 1727) was an Irish lawyer, judge and politician, notable mainly for presiding at the Islandmagee witch trial of 1711, which was apparently the last such trial in Ireland.

== Biography ==
He was the eldest son of George Macartney, surveyor of Belfast, and his first wife Jane Calderwood; George Macartney, 1st Earl Macartney, was descended from his younger brother. He entered Middle Temple in 1671 and the King's Inn in 1677.

He sat in the Irish House of Commons as member for Belfast from 1692 to 1693 and from 1695 to 1699 and in 1701 was made second justice of the Court of King's Bench. He was removed from the Bench in 1711 due to his political allegiance but reappointed in 1714, and was transferred to the Court of Common Pleas the same year.

== Witch trials ==
Historians have criticised the credulity he displayed at the Islandmagee witchcraft trials of 1711, which were the last such trials to be held in Ireland. Eight women were charged with bewitching a young woman called Mary Dunbar; in noted contrast to his colleague Mr Justice Upton, who called them women of blameless life and devout churchgoers, and urged the jury to acquit them, Macartney urged the jury to convict, which they duly did. On the other hand, since in theory witchcraft was a capital crime, the sentence he imposed of a year's imprisonment with four sessions in the pillory was relatively lenient.

== Later years ==
Despite much criticism of his conduct at the Islandmagee trials, he was later spoken of twice as Chief Justice of the Irish Common Pleas, but was passed over. He retired from the Bench in 1726 and died in London the following year.

Macartney married firstly Frances, daughter of Sir Anthony Irby and Catherine Paget, who died in 1684, and secondly Alice, daughter of Sir James Cuffe and his wife Alice Aungier, sister of Francis Aungier, 1st Earl of Longford, by whom he had a son, James Macartney junior. Alice died on 7 October 1725. Their descendants included the poet Frances Greville (née Macartney) and her daughter, the noted political hostess Frances Anne Crewe.

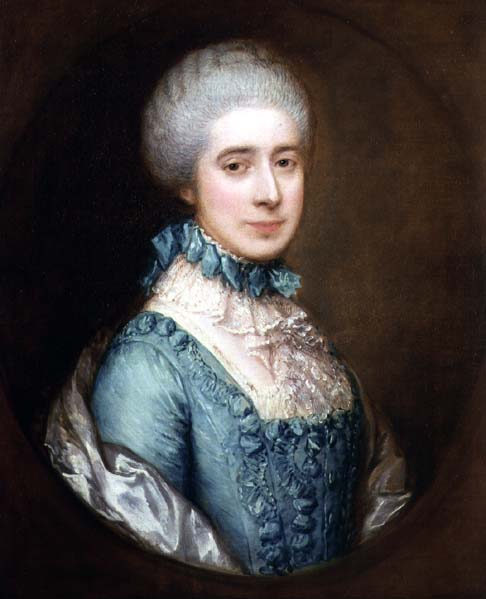
Mrs Crewe, the celebrated political hostess: she was the judge's great-granddaughter

Parliament of Ireland
Preceded by Mark Talbot	Member of Parliament for Belfast; 1692–1703; With: George Macartney 1692–95; Charles Chichester 1695–1703	Succeeded by William Crafford; William Cairnes
