= Florence Newton =

17th century Irish woman accused of witchcraft

- Born: 1595 or 1596
- Died: 1661; Cork, Ireland
- Other name: "Witch of Youghal"
- Known for: Being one of the few people tried for witchcraft in Ireland
- Criminal charges: Using witchcraft to kill in contravention of the Irish Witchcraft Act 1586

Florence Newton (b. 1595 or 1596; d. 1661) was a woman who was tried for witchcraft in Youghal, County Cork, Ireland. Though she likely died while awaiting a verdict, St John Seymour described her case as one of the most important examples of Irish witch trials.

== Biography ==
Florence Newton was a spinster and beggar born in 1595 or 1596. She belonged to a population of English Puritans who had established a colony in Youghal during the Cromwellian conquest of Ireland. By early 1661, Youghal's population stood at around 2,300.

Youghal's authorities were likely already suspicious of Newton before she was formally accused. According to the mayor of the time, Richard Mayre (or Myre), the infants of at least three yeomen died shortly after Newton kissed them. Mayre would claim at trial that Newton had also paid him a visit after the birth of his daughter, Grace, who died five weeks later. He was so certain that Newton had inflicted an unusual ailment on Grace that he ordered an autopsy for her, but the results found no "inward imperfection or defect".

==== Political context ====
Newton's prosecution marked the first witch trial in southern Ireland since 1578. Her English Puritan background was therefore significant, because the native Irish population was far less likely to believe in witches. They maintained a rich tradition of folklore that attributed misfortunes to other entities, such as the aos sídhe, rather than people. They also associated the practice of witch trials with English and Scottish colonisers. Conversely, as Samuel Hayman writes, Puritans were "firm believers" in witches, setting the stage for Newton's trial.

English Puritans were also navigating a period of political upheaval. In May 1660, sixteen months before Newton's trial, Cromwellian settlers in Ireland were disturbed by the restoration of King Charles II of England. The monarchy's revival marked the end of Cromwell's republic and threatened the significant political influence and land that English Puritans had acquired in Ireland. As a result, historian William Kramer suggests that the Puritan stronghold of Youghal was uniquely vulnerable to the public hysteria of a witch hunt, despite the overall rarity of witch trials in Ireland.

Youghal had also weathered a minor panic when an Irish Catholic sea captain, George Codd, challenged Youghal's customs officials in November 1660. After overhearing them discuss fears about Catholics having their lands restored by the monarchy, Codd reportedly described the English as "dogs and traitors" for displacing Irish populations. Codd was arrested in December and questioned by Youghal's mayor, Richard Mayre, but ultimately released.

Peter Elmer, academic and biographer of a witness in Newton's trial, suggests the community's fears of instability reached a "fever pitch" that resulted in "the arrest and punishment of a universally loathed figure, the witch". Academic Andrew Sneddon likewise concludes that Newton represented a common enemy for Youghal's English Protestants during a time of upheaval and uncertainty.

== Alleged harassment of Mary Longdon ==
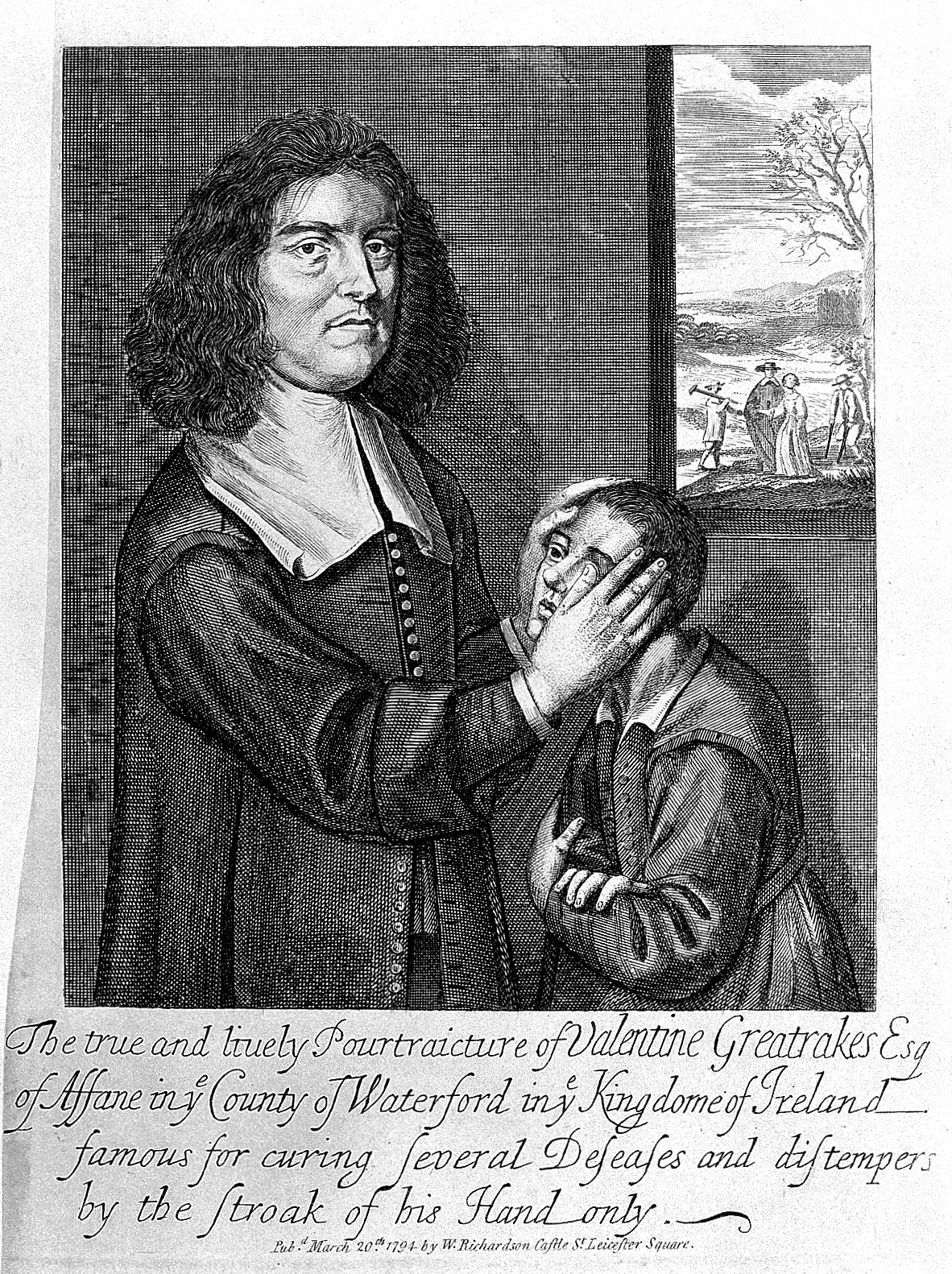
Portrait of Valentine Greatrakes (dated 1794), who was an influential witness in Newton's case.

=== Mary Longdon and the Pyne household ===
Mary Longdon, Newton's principal accuser, was a servant at the household of merchant John Pyne. Though employed as a maid, Longdon was young and literate. Her employer John and his relative, Nicholas Pyne, were both prominent members of Youghal society and friends of Valentine Greatrakes, a well-known local landowner.

In the 1650s, Nicholas and Greatrakes had been co-defendants in a legal dispute with the Earl of Cork. (This Nicholas was also possibly the father of Richard Pyne, eventual Lord Chief Justice of Ireland.) Nicholas, John Pyne, and Greatrakes would all eventually testify against Newton.

=== Alleged harassment ===
Longdon first became acquainted with Newton around four years before the trial. Longdon alleged that, on Christmas Day in 1660, Newton approached Pyne's house to request some beef to eat. Newton was angered when Longdon declined to share her employer's food, but left nonetheless. A week later, Newton intercepted Longdon while she was fetching water, forcibly emptied her water pail, and "violently" kissed her. Newton said she bore Longdon no "ill will" and hoped the sentiment was reciprocated.

A few days later, Longdon claimed she awoke to see Newton beside her bed with a mysterious man dressed in silk, who resembled a "spirit". The man urged Newton to "follow his advice" if she wished to have "all things after her own heart," but Longdon refused, saying she followed only the word of God. Longdon claimed to subsequently experience strange phenomena. She suffered violent fits, had stones thrown at her by unseen entities, and began to vomit peculiar items, such as straw and needles. She also claimed to find herself teleported at random from room to room within her employer's property. Throughout, she saw visions in which Newton appeared beside the silk-clad man.

=== Arrest ===
Word of Longdon's apparent supernatural torment spread throughout Youghal and reached its mayor, Richard Mayre, who visited the Pyne estate in March 1661. After learning that Newton was the prime suspect, he fetched her to interrogate her. At first, Newton suggested that two other local women, Dod and Halfpenny, were responsible for cursing Longdon. When Mayre threatened to subject her to a trial by water, Newton confessed that she had cursed Longdon with a kiss, for which she was "heartily sorry."

Unsatisfied, Mayre brought Dod, Halfpenny and Newton to the Pyne house on 24 March, leaving each alone with Longdon in turn. When Longdon reacted to Newton's presence by seemingly having another seizure, Mayre ordered Newton's immediate arrest. The women named Dod and Halfpenny escaped prosecution after offering to submit to any trial Mayre suggested.

== Incarceration and David Jones' death ==
Youghal's Clock Gate Tower, which stands on the site of Youghal's former historic jail (pictured 2003).

Newton would have been held at the site of Youghal's Clock Gate building while awaiting trial. Amateur witch hunters visited Newton during her imprisonment, employing techniques to detect so-called witches that were popularised by Matthew Hopkins.

One was Valentine Greatrakes, friend of the Pynes. His methods influenced several of Youghal's prominent men, with whom he was well-acquainted. These included Edward Perry, a freeman of the borough, and Church of Ireland minister Thomas Blackwell (recorded in the trial notes as Blackwall). Blackwell pierced her hand with an awl until he drew blood, owing to a common belief at the time that unusual physical marks were the sign of a witch and could not be injured.

Nicholas Pyne, friend of Greatrakes and relative of Longdon's employer, John Pyne, similarly visited Newton to question her. He later testified that Newton denied being a witch, but admitted that she may have "overlooked" Longdon, the equivalent of the evil eye in Irish mythology.

In early April 1661, two local men, David Jones and Francis Besely, visited the jail to "stand sentinel" over the alleged witch within. The pair, who are interpreted by some historians to have been prison wardens, spoke with Newton through the prison gate. Jones tried to teach Newton the Lord's Prayer, owing to a popular belief at the time that witches could not recite it. Newton claimed to struggle with the lines due to her ageing memory. At some point, Newton asked to kiss Jones' hand through the gate to thank him, to which he agreed.

After returning home, Jones told his wife Elenor that he felt pain in his arm after making contact with Newton. According to Elenor, over the next two weeks, Jones complained of the pain intensifying and spreading to his heart, culminating in his death on 20 April 1661.

== Trial ==
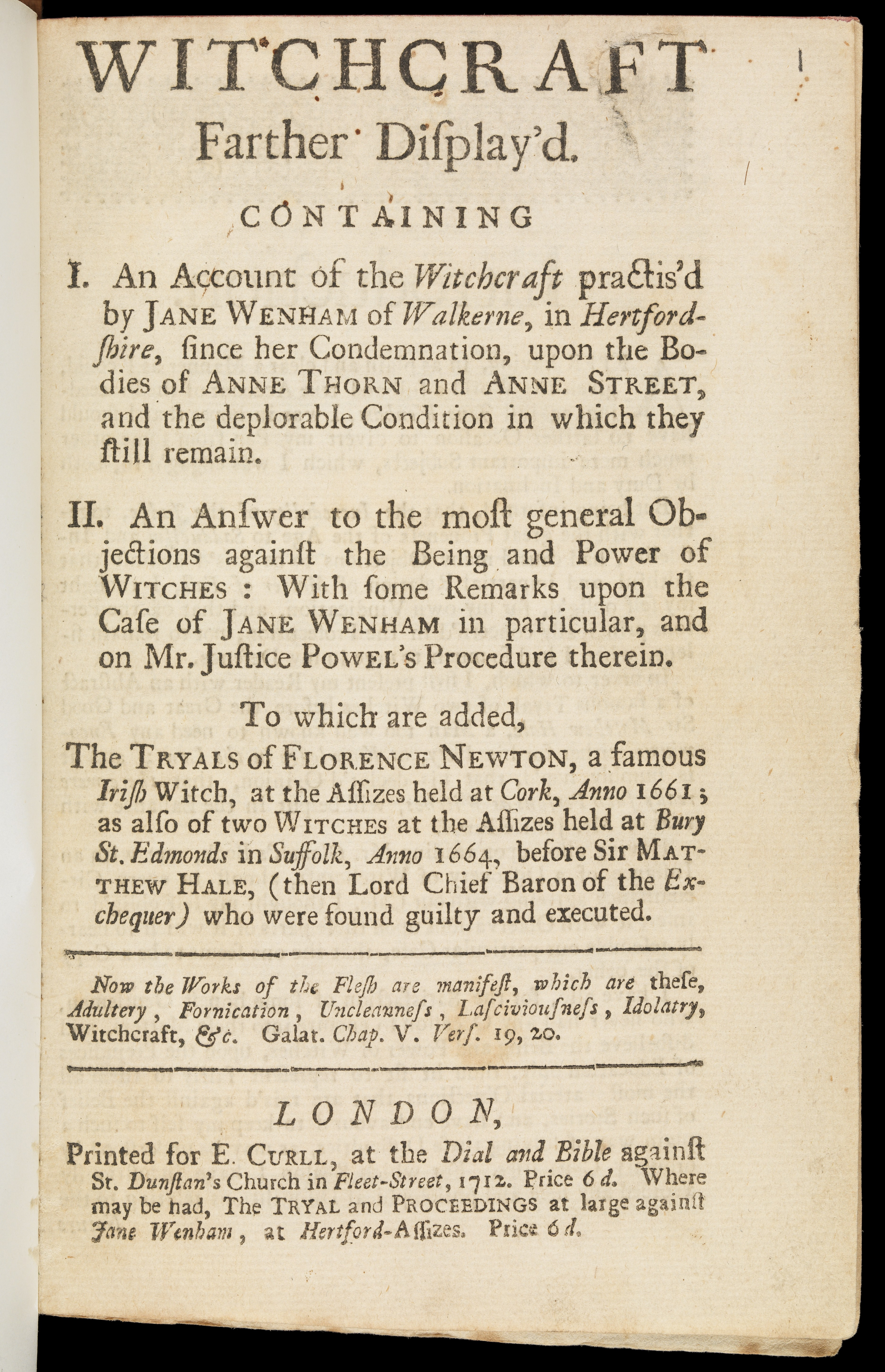
1712 pamphlet by deacon Francis Bragge, covering Newton's case.

On 11 September 1661, Newton stood trial for using witchcraft to torment Mary Longdon and to kill David Jones. She pleaded not guilty to both charges.

The presiding judge was Sir William Aston, whose transcript became the trial's primary source. Joseph Glanvill included an edited version in his 1681 publication, Saducismus Triumphatus. Aston, like many of the witnesses involved, had a prior relationship with Valentine Greatrakes, having ruled in his favour during a previous civil dispute. The Crown seemingly regarded the trial as one of some importance, as evidenced by the involvement of Sir William Domville, Attorney-General for Ireland, who travelled from Dublin to Cork to prosecute Newton personally.

David Jones' wife and friend, Elenor Jones and Francis Beseley, testified first to the circumstances of David's death. Longdon, the prosecution's main witness, then recited her claims about her own experiences. After Longdon finished testifying, Newton reacted by angrily shaking her fists. This prompted Longdon to seemingly suffer another seizure in the courtroom, which lasted fifteen minutes. Observers claimed that Newton sat quietly and watched, pinching at her hands and arms.

Longdon's employer, John Pyne, testified that he had seen stones thrown at Longdon by an unseen entity. He claimed to have witnessed Longdon's fits, and the aftermath of her purported teleportation to unusual places around the house. Mayor Richard Mayre alleged that Newton had kissed four children of Youghal officials, including his own daughter, shortly before each infant had died.

George Lowther, an English soldier billeted at Youghal, testified that Newton had once asked the servants of his host for food, akin to her interaction with Longdon in December 1660. Newton had begun to mutter angrily when the servants refused, prompting Lowther to intervene and expel Newton. He claimed to then experience an intense migraine for several nights. When Lowther encountered Newton a second time, she asked to kiss him to prove she bore him no ill will. He refused on the grounds that he would not let an "old hag" kiss him, and afterwards experienced stomach pain for several nights. He attributed this to Newton being a witch.

Newton was also asked to recite the Lord's Prayer in court. She struggled to remember the order of the lines, which she blamed on cognitive decline due to her age.

== Death of Florence Newton ==
The most-referenced account of Newton's case, found in Joseph Glanvill's Saducismus Triumphatus (1681), is silent on whether Newton was found guilty. For many years, scholars assumed she was convicted and likely executed, because the Irish Witchcraft Act 1586 provided the death penalty for convicted witches who were found to have killed their victims.

In 2019, academic Andrew Sneddon found and published William Aston's original trial notes, which do not explicitly denote whether Newton was found guilty. Rather, it states (in Early Modern English) that she "died about sixty five [years of age] or thereabouts, being at the last Assizes for the County of Cork", suggesting she died around the time of the trial. While it is possible that Newton was convicted and sentenced to death, Sneddon points out that Aston would have had no reason to omit the verdict from his notes. Sneddon posits that, instead, Newton likely died from the "stress of being an elderly, lonely, economically and socially marginalised woman".

== Historical analysis ==
=== Profile of Florence Newton ===
Florence Newton's profile as an elderly, impoverished, and likely illiterate widow meant she was especially vulnerable to accusations of witchcraft for the time. Academic Michael Twomey suggests that Newton was likely aware of this fact, hence her attempts to make peace with both Mary Longdon and George Lowther after disagreements them over her begging.

Mary McAuliffe suggests that Newton's habit of freely kissing others rattled her Puritan neighbours, whose strict beliefs in chastity were incompatible with an "uncontained female touch". As a single or possibly widowed woman, Newton lacked "direct male guardianship or control," elevating the likelihood of her being viewed as a threat that should "be excised for the common good." McAuliffe also contrasts Newton with Greatrakes, who testified against her. He purported to cure people through the laying on of hands; his touch was viewed as restorative, unlike Newton's "polluting female touch".

Furthermore, Newton's defence against claims of witchcraft was her failing memory. Subsequently, McAuliffe theorises that Newton was experiencing early symptoms of age-related senility or dementia that caused her to act with erratic aggression.

=== Witness motivations ===
Andrew Lang suggests the trial was the product of "hysterical imposture" by Mary Longdon. He notes that it was "customary" for self-proclaimed victims of witches to describe vomiting strange objects, such as pins. Indeed, a belief that the Devil could make people vomit unusual objects had been a staple of witch trials in Europe since the 15th century. Lang's views mirror that of writer Frank Podmore, who counts the Newton trial as one of many wherein the so-called victims' "symptoms [of] alleged bewitchment were... monotonously alike".

A. R. George Owen, mathematician and parapsychologist, posits that Longdon "invented" her bewitchment and used sleight of hand tricks to play the role of a poltergeist. Owen suggests that, at trial, John Pyne "may have been exaggerating" what he saw of Longdon's supposed assaults by an unseen entity. As it was not unheard of for Puritan landowners to become intimate with their servants, Owen infers that Pyne may have been a willing (or reluctant) participant in her deceit due to a relationship between them. Podmore similarly finds it noteworthy that Pyne "bore witness" to Longdon's "miraculous" claims. He counts their claims among a series of clear "frauds" in Europe's witch trials that could be the product of either "self-deception [or] malevolent trickery".

Andrew Sneddon, a leading modern expert on Ireland's witch trials, notes that Newton had asked Longdon for food shortly before Longdon's alleged bewitchment began. Longdon's claims therefore resembled other cases that scholars of Europe's witch trials classify under the 'charity-refused model.' This model, as defined by researcher Jonathan Barry, posits that Longdon feigned her bewitchment because she "felt guilt" for refusing to aid Newton; to alleviate her conscience, she "attributed subsequent misfortune [to] malice of the person refused".

In his history of Youghal, Michael Twomey concludes that Longdon was motivated by a "self-centred" desire for attention, but her claims were readily accepted and platformed by "ambitious" men in the community who "desired to be at the centre of a national controversy as a means to boost their importance and influence". He highlights Valentine Greatrakes, who became a faith healer of some renown within a year of Newton's trial, and notes that the Cromwellian settlers would have been motivated to "take a positive role in finding evil and ridding" Youghal of it, to improve their reputations in the eyes of the restored monarchy.

In a more sympathetic interpretation, academic Imogen Knox proposes that Longdon's improbable claims were attempts to understand her own suicidal ideation. Knox finds "suicidal connotations" in Longdon's tendency to seemingly teleport into isolated parts of the house. Her claims of being cursed may have been subconscious attempts to seek the support and supervision of her community. Journalist Nicola Depuis suggests that Newton's alleged murder victim, David Jones, may have died from heart failure, and Longdon herself had epilepsy.

== Impact on later witch trials ==
Fortean Times founder Bob Rickard notes that testimony later given at the Salem witch trials bore a resemblance to Mary Longdon's claims. Both Longdon and self-proclaimed victims of witchcraft in Salem testified that they experienced fits so violent that multiple men could not hold them down.

Andrew Sneddon compares Newton's case to that of Ireland's next witch trials in Islandmagee in 1711. In both cases, the principal accuser was an educated young woman who claimed to have been targeted by a person or persons from a poor background with comparatively lower social standing. Mary Dunbar, the accuser in the 1711 case, claimed to experience symptoms that heavily resembled Longdon's claims, such as vomiting strange items and suffering violent fits.

== In arts and culture ==
Emma Donoghue presents a fictionalised retelling of Newton's trial in her 1996 play, Trespasses. The play was adapted into an opera, Vagabones, by Raymond Deane in 2019. In these adaptations, Longdon is portrayed as in love with an ambivalent John Pyne, who manipulates her into accusing Newton.

== See also ==
- Islandmagee witch trial
- Alice Kyteler
