= Swimbridge =

Village in Devon, England

Coordinates: 51.0529°N 3.9704°W

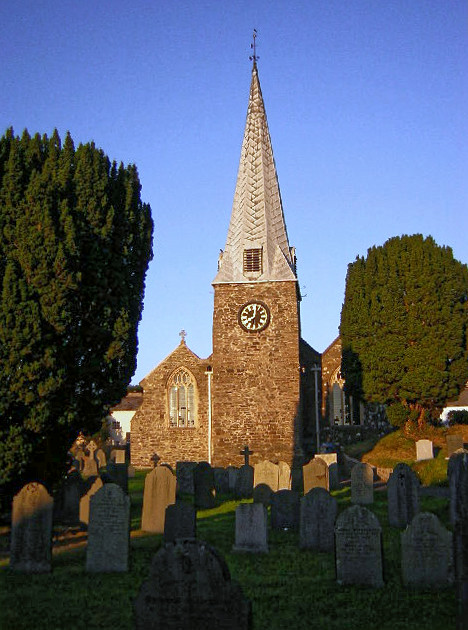
The Parish Church of St. James, Swimbridge

Swimbridge (historical spelling: Swymbridge) is a village, parish and former manor in Devon, England. It is situated 4 miles (6.4 km) south-east of Barnstaple and twinned with the town of St.Honorine Du Fay in Normandy, France. It was the home of the Rev. John "Jack" Russell who first bred the Jack Russell Terrier.

== Etymology ==
The manor is called Birige in the Domesday Book of 1086, when it was held in-chief from King William the Conqueror by an Anglo-Saxon priest named Sawin (or Saewin), whose uncle Brictferth had held it before the Norman Conquest of 1066. The honour of being a tenant-in-chief in feudal times was generally restricted to great warriors and close followers of the king, but Sawin was given this land in alms by Queen Matilda, wife of William the Conqueror. It was probably part of the royal manor of South Molton, and Sawin was probably one of the priests at South Molton. It thenceforward became known as "Sawain's Birige" which eventually transformed into "Swimbridge".

== Description ==
Before the changes to parish boundaries in 2003, at 7,280 acres (29.5 km^{2}) it was one of the largest in North Devon. It formerly hosted a number of historic estates.

The village is noted for its church (The Parish Church of St. James; tower ca. 1300) which has been described as a treasure house due to its fine carvings and memorials.

== Church ==
Door within chancel screen, entry to St Bridget's Chapel, north aisle of Swimbridge Church, looking east

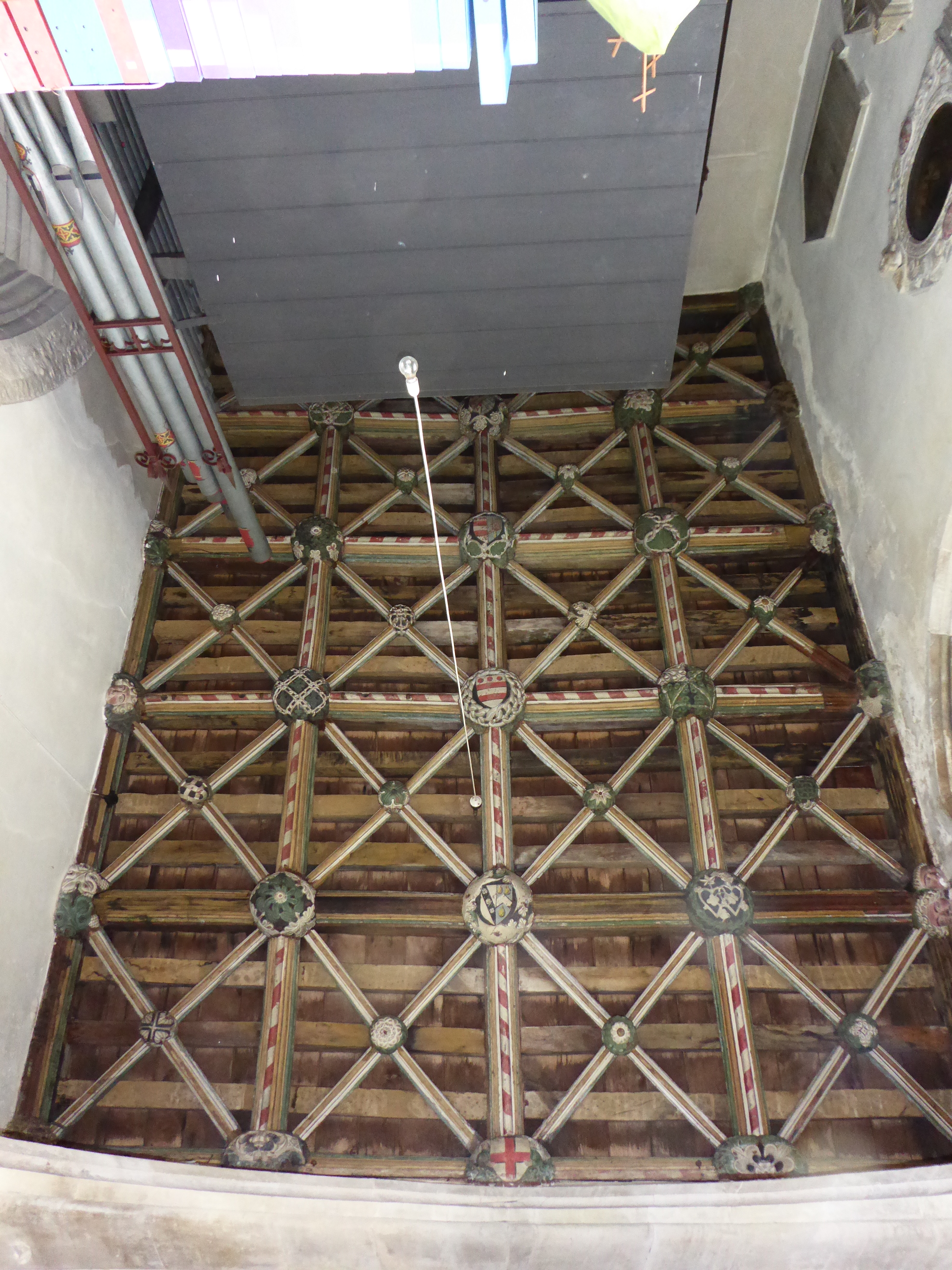
Ceiling of St Bridget's Chapel with heraldic bosses showing arms of Mules, repainted in 1727

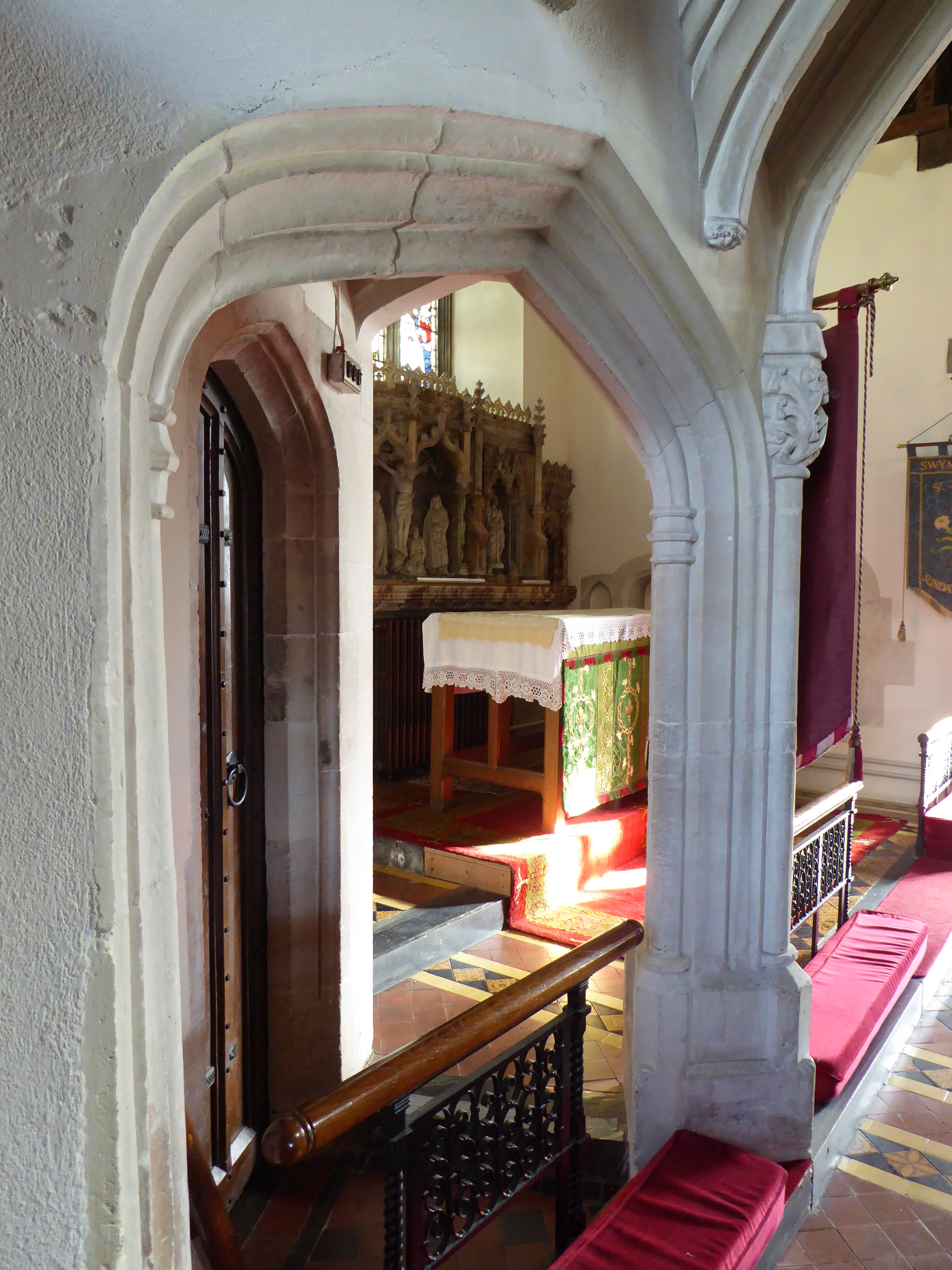
Squint allowing a view of the high altar from within St Bridget's Chapel

According to Tristram Risdon, writing in the early 17th century, John Mules of Ernesborough built the north aisle of Swimbridge Church, and gave his estate of Furse for the maintenance of it. This is known as St Bridget's Chapel, or the "North Chancel Chapel".

In his will dated 1422 John D'Abernon requested to be buried in the "newly built aisle". This manorial chapel served to seat the household of the Mules family. It is now mostly occupied by the large Victorian organ and the remaining space serves as a vestry. It includes an interesting squint in the form of the corner of a wall being removed and held up with a column, which would allow the family to view the priest elevating the host at the high altar, the holiest point of the Roman Catholic mass. The surviving roof bosses of the North Chancel Chapel display various arms of Moels, repainted in 1727 as a date shows. Pevsner states Swimbridge Church itself to have been "mostly rebuilt in the 15th and 16th centuries".

== Jack Russell Terrier ==
The parish was the home of the Rev. John "Jack" Russell, Vicar of Swimbridge and Rector of Black Torrington, who first bred the Jack Russell Terrier. Russell is said to have acquired his first terrier, Trump, whilst he was studying at Oxford University and then bred from her to eventually originate the Jack Russell strain of terrier. Russell died in 1883 and was buried in the graveyard of St. James's Church. The village pub is named The Jack Russell and displays an image of Trump on its sign.

== Railway ==
From 1873 to 1966, Swimbridge had a station on the Devon and Somerset Railway, which became part of the Great Western Railway and which ran from Taunton to Barnstaple.

== Industry ==
Leather Tanning was a major local industry until 1965.

== Twin towns – sister cities ==
Swimbridge,is twinned with:

- Sainte-Honorine-du-Fay, France.
