= Anthony Upton (judge) =

English judge

Anthony Upton (1656–1718) was an English-born judge, much of whose career was spent in Ireland. He was a close friend of the poet William King, who lived for a time at Mountown, Upton's country house near Dublin. Upton was accused by his critics of neglecting his official duties, but he showed a notably enlightened attitude at the Islandmagee witch trial of 1711, where he urged the jury, without success, to acquit the accused women. He was removed from the Bench in 1714, on account of his political affiliation, and returned to England, where he committed suicide for unknown reasons in 1718.

== Early life ==
He was born at Monken Hadley in Middlesex (now a suburb of north London). He was the son of John Upton (d.1689) of Hadley and later of Stoke Newington, Middlesex, by his wife Jane daughter of Sir John Lytcott of Molesey, Surrey. He was educated at Oxford, first at Trinity College and then at All Souls College, from which he graduated in 1674. He entered Lincoln's Inn and was called to the Bar in 1683.

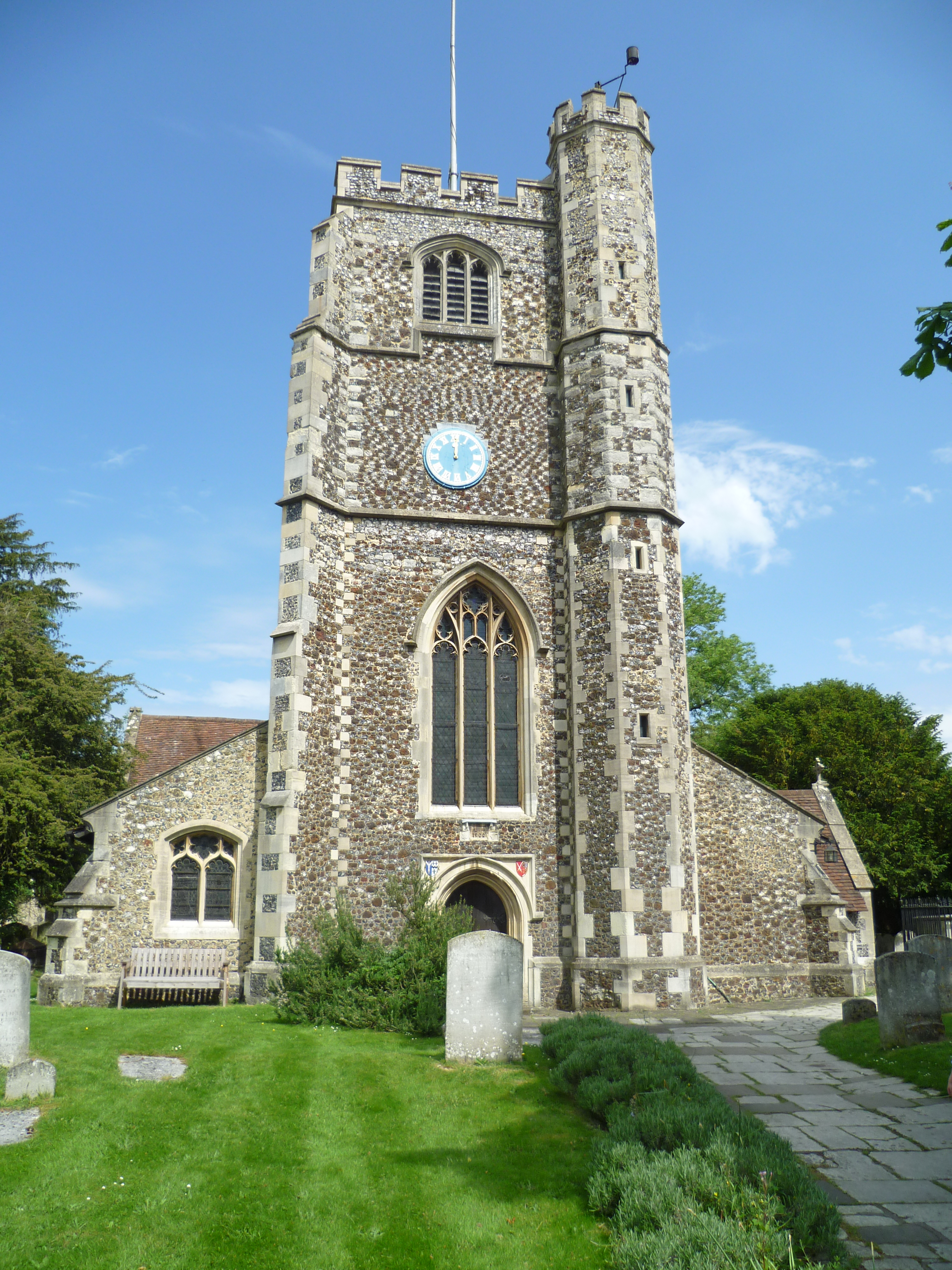
St Mary's Church, Monken Hadley. Upton was born in Monken Hadley.

== Friendship with William King ==
He was appointed a judge of the Court of Common Pleas (Ireland) in 1702. He acquired a comfortable house at Mountown, previously the family home of the noted writer Sir Richard Steele, near present-day Monkstown, Dublin. He was accused by his political opponents of spending most of his time at Mountown, to the neglect of his office, in the company of his friend, the poet William King. King wrote one of his best-known poems, Mully of Mountown (a mock ode to a red cow) while staying with Upton. They shared a taste for poetry and a keen enjoyment of country life. Since King was also a Crown official, who held several senior positions including Judge Advocate and Commissioner for Prizes, there may be some justice in the criticism that they were both neglecting their official duties. It was said that the pair 'thought of nothing but spending their last years in their rural retreat"; but in the event, King returned to England in 1708 and died there in 1712.

Upton, to do him justice, was not alone in neglecting his official duties: his colleague Sir Gilbert Dolben, 1st Baronet, despite his position on the Irish Court of Common Pleas, refused to vacate his seat in the House of Commons of England and spent part of every year in England.

== Witch trials ==
On at least one occasion Upton showed himself to be a responsible and humane judge: this was at the Islandmagee witch trial in 1711. These were apparently the last witchcraft trials in Ireland, and are said to have originated in a dispute between two Protestant factions, the accusers being non-conformists while the accused were Anglicans. Eight women- Janet Mean, Janet Latimer, Janet Miller, Margaret Mitchell, Catherine McCalmond, Janet Liston, Elizabeth Seller and Janet Carson- were accused of bewitching a young woman called Mary Dunbar.

Upton in his summing-up to the jury did not deny the existence of witchcraft- which would be a very advanced view for the time- rather he dwelt on the good character of the accused. Since witches were expected to renounce churchgoing on giving their allegiance to the Devil, he pointed to the accuseds' regular attendance at church as evidence of their innocence (a similar point had been frequently made during the Salem witch trials of 1692) and referred to their accuser Mary Dunbar's evidence as "visionary imaginings" (another echo of the Salem trials, where the mental health of the accusers was a crucial issue). He told the jury that they "could not bring the accused in guilty upon such evidence".

Unfortunately for the accused, his fellow judge James Macartney urged the jury to convict, which they duly did. Since witchcraft was, in theory, a capital crime, the sentence- a year in prison and four sessions in the pillory- may seem relatively lenient, although it is said that the convicts were treated very roughly by an angry crowd while being pilloried. However Upton's enlightened attitude may have helped to ensure that there were no further witch trials in Ireland.

== Death ==
On the death of Queen Anne in 1714, her Irish judges were removed en masse and most of them were in temporary political disgrace. No permanent damage was done to their reputation or their subsequent careers, but Upton perhaps felt the disgrace more keenly than the others. Abandoning his beloved home at Mountown, he returned to England and resumed his practice at the English Bar, but in 1718, while suffering from what was described as "delirium", he cut his throat at his temporary chambers at Gray's Inn.
