= Richard Pyne =

Irish landowner, barrister and judge

Sir Richard Pyne (1644 – December 1709) was an Irish landowner, barrister and judge. He held office as Lord Chief Justice of Ireland from 1695-1709.

== Background - the Pynes of Mogeely ==
He was born in County Cork, the fourth son of Nicholas Pyne of Mogeely, near Castlemartyr and Jane Tynte, daughter and co-heiress of Sir Robert Tynte of Ballycrenane (of the family of the Tynte Baronets) and his wife Elizabeth Boyle, who was one of the numerous cousins of the Earl of Cork. His father was probably the Nicholas Pyne who was a key witness for the prosecution at the trial of Florence Newton for witchcraft held at Youghal in 1661.

Nicholas was the eldest son of the English-born settler Henry Pyne (or Pine) of Mogeely (Mogylie). Henry, who is thought to have belonged to a junior branch of the prominent Pyne family of Upton Pyne, Devon, had received a substantial lease of lands in County Cork c.1589, and built Mogeely Castle (which no longer stands, although some remains survive). During the serious disturbances in Munster in 1598, he saved himself by a headlong flight back to England, but was later accused of secretly helping the Irish rebels, although there is no evidence for this. In fairness to Henry, he was only one of many settlers in Munster who fled ignominiously to safety. Henry returned to Ireland in about 1601 and prospered, despite quarrelling with other settlers, notably Sir Walter Raleigh, from whom he rented his lands, and the formidable Richard Boyle, 1st Earl of Cork, who acquired Raleigh's interest; there was also much gossip about his unscrupulous business practices. He died sometime after 1620. His wife was a Miss Stronge from Dunkitt, County Kilkenny.

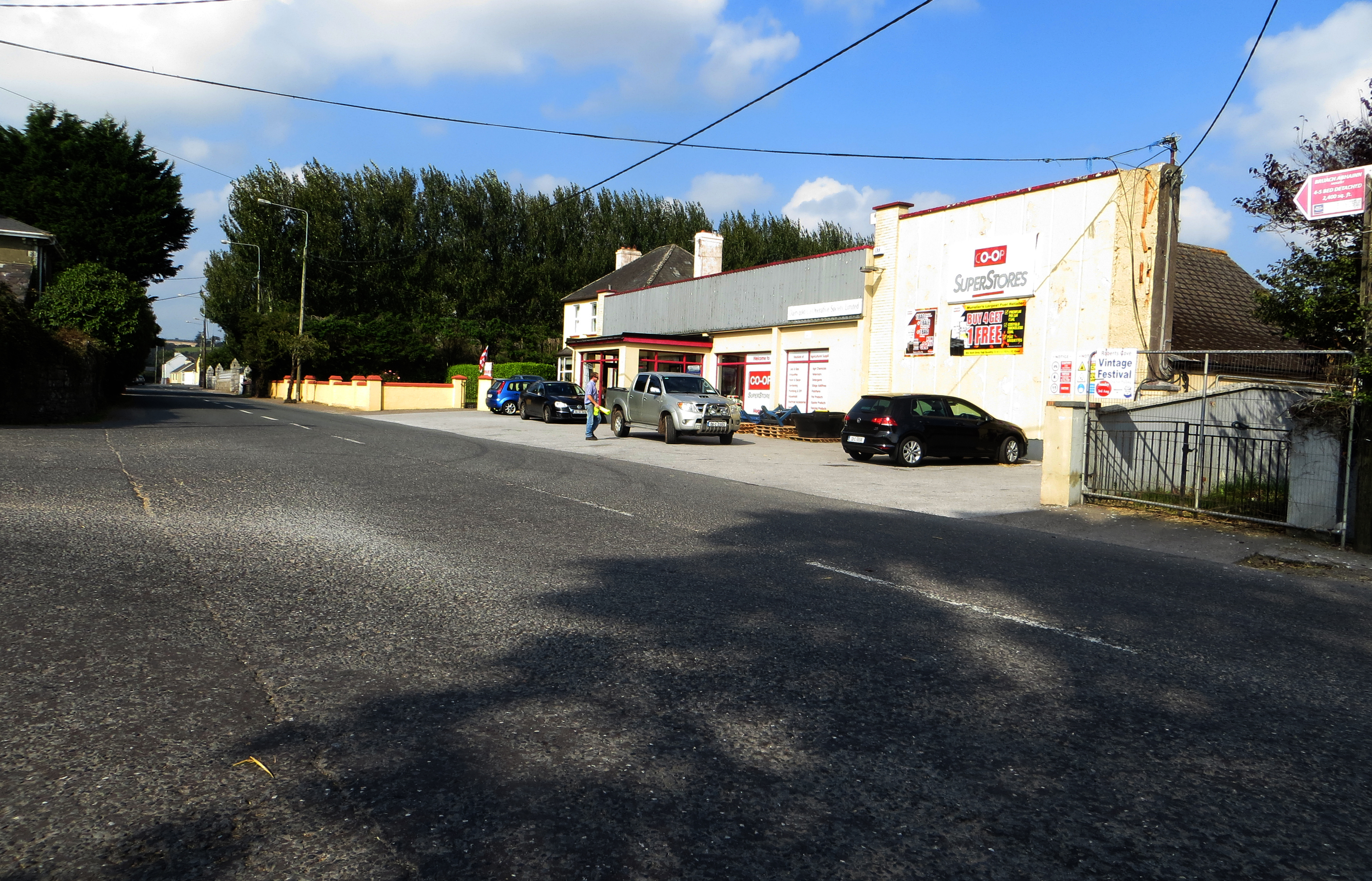
Mogeely, County Cork, present day. The Pyne family were the main landowners here, and built Mogeely Castle, which no longer stands, apart from a few traces

== Education and early career ==
Richard matriculated from Queen's College, Oxford in 1662 and entered the Middle Temple the same year. He was called to the English Bar in 1669 and to the Irish Bar in 1674 when he also entered the King's Inns. In the same year he inherited the estates of his brother Henry, who had just died childless (their father had died in 1670). He became King's Counsel in 1685, and in 1686 counsel to the Irish Revenue Commissioners. Although he was willing to accept office under the Roman Catholic King James II, he was himself a strong Protestant and a Whig in politics, and was later a supporter of the Revolution of 1688. In 1688 he quarrelled sharply with Justin MacCarthy, Viscount Mountcashel, one of James II's most influential Irish generals, but later denied that he had fought a duel with him.

== Judicial career ==
After the Battle of the Boyne in 1690, he was appointed joint Commissioner of the Great Seal of Ireland with Sir Richard Ryves and Sir Robert Rochfort and also acted as a judge of oyer and terminer in Ulster. Early in 1691 he was appointed Chief Justice of the Irish Common Pleas, at the personal request of William III. This was a notable mark of royal favour, as the office had apparently already been promised to John Osborne, the Prime Serjeant. The decision to appoint Pyne instead may reflect Osborne's growing unpopularity with his political superiors, who removed him from office the following year for gross insubordination. Pyne was knighted in 1692.

Pyne was promoted to the office of Lord Chief Justice of the King's Bench for Ireland in 1695. He held the latter office until his death, although he seems to have been in failing health in his last years, and frequently visited Bath in the hope of a cure.

The memoirist and poet Elizabeth Freke (who was English-born, but married a Freke cousin from County Cork and settled there) in her Diary noted his presiding at the Cork assizes in 1694, where he condemned 28 men to be hanged or branded in the hand (the latter was a frequent penalty for serious but non-capital crimes). Elizabeth made a personal plea for clemency in one case where she believed the condemned man was guilty of manslaughter, not murder. Pyne presided at the trial for embezzlement of Colonel James Waller, Lieutenant-Governor of Kinsale, in 1697. As Chief Justice he clashed with the powerful cleric William King, Bishop of Derry and future Archbishop of Dublin, who accused him of interfering in Church affairs. He is listed as one of the trustees of the King's Inns in 1706. He was awarded the Freedom of the City of Dublin in 1707. He died at his English estate at Ashley in Surrey in December 1709.

== Property ==
Pyne was a substantial landowner in County Cork: he lived mainly at Waterpark, near Carrigaline, and also acquired estates at Ardra and Ballinaneala. In 1703 he bought Blarney Castle, but sold it a few months later, apparently on the basis of a rumour (unfounded as it turned out) that the dispossessed owners, the MacCarthys, were about to recover it. He also owned an estate at Ashley, near Guildford, Surrey, where he died, and Great Codham Hall near Braintree, Essex. He is chiefly remembered nowadays as the builder of Ballyvolane House near Fermoy, although it was not completed until a considerable time after his death.

== Family ==
He married Catherine Wandesford, daughter of Sir Christopher Wandsford, 1st Baronet of Kirklington, Yorkshire and Eleanor Lowther, and grand-daughter of the statesman Christopher Wandesford, Lord Deputy of Ireland and Alice Osborne. His only son Henry married Anne Edgecumbe, daughter of Sir Richard Edgecumbe and Lady Anne Montagu, and sister of Richard Edgcumbe, 1st Baron Edgcumbe. Their daughter Anne married Sir Henry Cavendish and was the mother of the statesman Sir Henry Cavendish, 2nd Baronet, whose descendants took the title Baron Waterpark.

Pyne also left substantial lands, including Ballyvolane, to his nephew Robert Wakeham, the son of his sister Jane. Jane had married a cousin, son of her aunt Catherine Pyne, who married Richard Wakeham. As a condition of inheriting these lands laid down in his uncle's will, Robert added the surname Pyne to his original name; the Wykeham Pynes remained at Ballyvolane for several generations. Robert was dead by 1715, when his widow Margaret filed a lawsuit in the Court of Chancery.

== Reputation ==
In 1698, the Irish-born author and publisher John Dunton who was on a visit to Dublin, gave a favourable picture of most of the Irish judiciary, including Pyne, describing them as "men whose reputation is such that no one complains of them".

A portrait of Pyne in his judicial robes by William Gandy still exists.

Legal offices
| Preceded by John Keating | Chief Justice of the Irish Common Pleas; 1691–1695 | Succeeded by Sir John Hely |
| Preceded by Sir Richard Reynell | Lord Chief Justice of Ireland; 1695–1709 | Succeeded by Alan Brodrick |
