= William Gandy =

English painter

William Gandy (c. 1655 or c.1660–1729), was an English portrait-painter.

== Life ==
Gandy, son of James Gandy, was probably born in Ireland. For some years he was an itinerant painter in Devon and the west of England. He went to Plymouth in 1714, and eventually settled in Exeter. According to Northcote, whose grandfather and father knew and befriended Gandy:

He was a man of a most untractable disposition, very resentful, of unbounded pride, and in the latter part of his life both idle and luxurious; of which I remember to have heard many instances from my father who knew him, and whose portrait he painted when a child.
He was at all times totally careless of his reputation as a painter; and more particularly so if any thing happened in the course of his business to displease him.

He liked people to think that he was a natural son of his father's patron, the Duke of Ormonde, and that he was so much concerned in the duke's affairs that he was not able to make a public appearance in London.

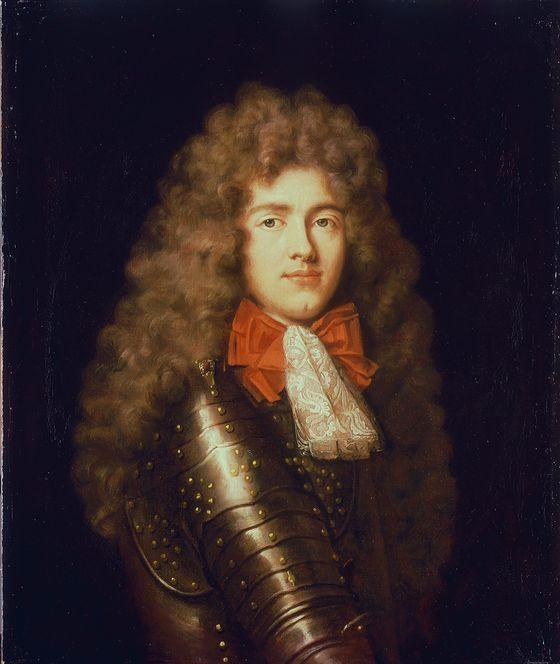
Gandy's portrait of the second Duke of Ormonde

His portraits, though sometimes slight and sketchy, showed real genius, and were frequently admired by great artists. The portrait of the Rev. Tobias Langdon in the college hall at Exeter excited the admiration of Sir Godfrey Kneller. Gandy may also be credited with having directed and stimulated the rising genius of Sir Joshua Reynolds. Reynolds saw Gandy's pictures early in life, and they made a great impression on his mind; he, like Northcote, often borrowed one of Gandy's portraits, probably the Langdon portrait, to study.

He painted Sir Isaac Newton, James Northcote's grandmother, the Rev. Nathaniel Harding of Plymouth, the Rev. John Gilbert, vicar of St. Andrew's, Plymouth (engraved by Vertue as a frontispiece to Gilbert's Sermons), John Patch, surgeon in the Exeter Hospital, the Rev. William Musgrave (engraved by Michael van der Gucht), Sir Edward Seaward in the chapel of the poorhouse at Exeter, Sir Richard Pyne, Lord Chief Justice of Ireland in his judicial robes, Sir William Elwill, and others. Gandy frequently left his pictures to be finished by others. He died in Exeter, and was buried in St. Paul's Church on 14 July 1729.
