= James Gandy =

English painter

Memorial portrait of Charles Cutcliffe, died 1670, Swimbridge Church, Devon

James Gandy (1619–1689) was an English portrait-painter, one of the earliest native English painters. He was certainly one of the earliest portrait painters documented as working in Ireland.

== Life ==
Gandy was probably a native of Exeter. He is said to have been a pupil of Anthony van Dyck, and to have acquired some of his style; he may have painted the drapery in Van Dyck's pictures. In 1661 he was taken to Ireland by his patron, the Duke of Ormonde, and remained there until his death. He was the father of William Gandy.

== Works ==
He executed a number of copies of portraits by Van Dyck for the duke's collection at Kilkenny, some of which were sold at the dispersal of the collection, as original works. His principal portraits were done in Ireland, and remained there. One of the Duke of Ormonde was in the possession of the Earl of Leicester.
