= Hugh Wyndham, 4th Baron Leconfield =

British peer, politician and author

The Right Honourable The Lord Leconfield

Member of House of Lords
- Lord Temporal
- In office 16 April 1952 – 6 July 1963
- Preceded by: The 3rd Baron Leconfield
- Succeeded by: The 5th Baron Leconfield

Personal details
- Born: Hugh Archibald Wyndham; 4 October 1877 Petworth, West Sussex, England
- Died: 6 July 1963 (aged 85) London
- Spouse: Maud Lyttelton (m. 1908; died 1953)
- Occupation: Author, politician

Arms of Wyndham, Baron Leconfield and Egremont: Azure, a chevron between three lion's heads erased or a bordure wavy of the last. These are the arms of Wyndham of Orchard Wyndham, differenced by a bordure wavy, for the illegitimacy of the 1st Baron Leconfield.

Hugh Archibald Wyndham, 4th Baron Leconfield (4 October 1877 – 6 July 1963), was a British peer, politician and author. He succeeded his elder brother as fourth Baron Leconfield in 1952. He was the historian of the Wyndham family.

== Biography ==
Wyndham was born at the family estate, Petworth House, in Sussex. A direct descendant of Sir John Wyndham, he was the fourth (but third surviving) son of Henry Wyndham, 2nd Baron Leconfield, and Constance Evelyn Primrose, daughter of Archibald Primrose, Lord Dalmeny. His grandfather, George Wyndham, 1st Baron Leconfield, was the eldest illegitimate son and heir of George Wyndham, 3rd Earl of Egremont, from whom the family derived their considerable wealth.

Hugh was educated at Eton College and New College, Oxford.

In 1908, he married Maud Mary Lyttelton, daughter of Charles Lyttelton, 8th Viscount Cobham. She died in 1953, one year after he inherited the family titles from his older brother.

He did not move to the family estate in Petworth but primarily resided at Wyndham House in London. He died at the London Clinic in 1963, 11 years after inheriting the title.

Like his two elder brothers, he had no children, and the title passed to his younger brother Edward.

== Published works ==
- as The Hon. H. A. Wyndham (1933) Native Education : Ceylon, Java, Formosa, the Philippines, French Indo-China, and British Malaya (London: Milford). Problems of Imperial Trusteeship series.
- as The Hon. H. A. Wyndham (1935). The Atlantic and Slavery. Oxford University Press. ASIN B001U4RDIM.. Problems of Imperial Trusteeship series.
- as The Hon. H. A. Wyndham (1937). The Atlantic and Emancipation. Oxford University Press. ASIN B000H2FNPS. Problems of Imperial Trusteeship series.
- as The Hon. H. A. Wyndham (1939) A Family History, 1410-1688 : The Wyndhams of Norfolk and Somerset (London: Oxford).
- as The Hon. H. A. Wyndham (1950). A Family History, 1688-1837: The Wyndhams of Somerset, Sussex and Wiltshire. Oxford University Press. ASIN B000XY2IEY.
- as Lord Leconfield (1954). Petworth Manor in the Seventeenth Century. Oxford University Press. ASIN B000XY2IEY.
- as Lord Leconfield (1956). Sutton And Duncton Manors. Oxford University Press. ASIN B002M5TBJC.

Peerage of the United Kingdom
Preceded by Charles Wyndham	Baron Leconfield; 1952–1963; Member of the House of Lords (1952–1963)	Succeeded by Edward Wyndham
