= George Wyndham (disambiguation) =

George Wyndham (1863–1913) was a British political figure and writer.

George Wyndham may also refer to:

- George Wyndham, 3rd Earl of Egremont (1751–1837), English agriculturist, canal builder, art collector
- George Wyndham, 4th Earl of Egremont (1786–1845), English nobleman and naval officer
- George Wyndham, 1st Baron Leconfield (1787–1869), English soldier
- George Wyndham (table tennis) (1990–2026), Sierra Leonean table tennis player
- George Wyndham (winemarker) (1801–1870), English-Australian farmer, wine-grower and pastoralist
