= Carlyn Chisholm, Baroness Chisholm of Owlpen =

British politician and life peer (born 1951)

The Right Honourable The Baroness Chisholm of Owlpen
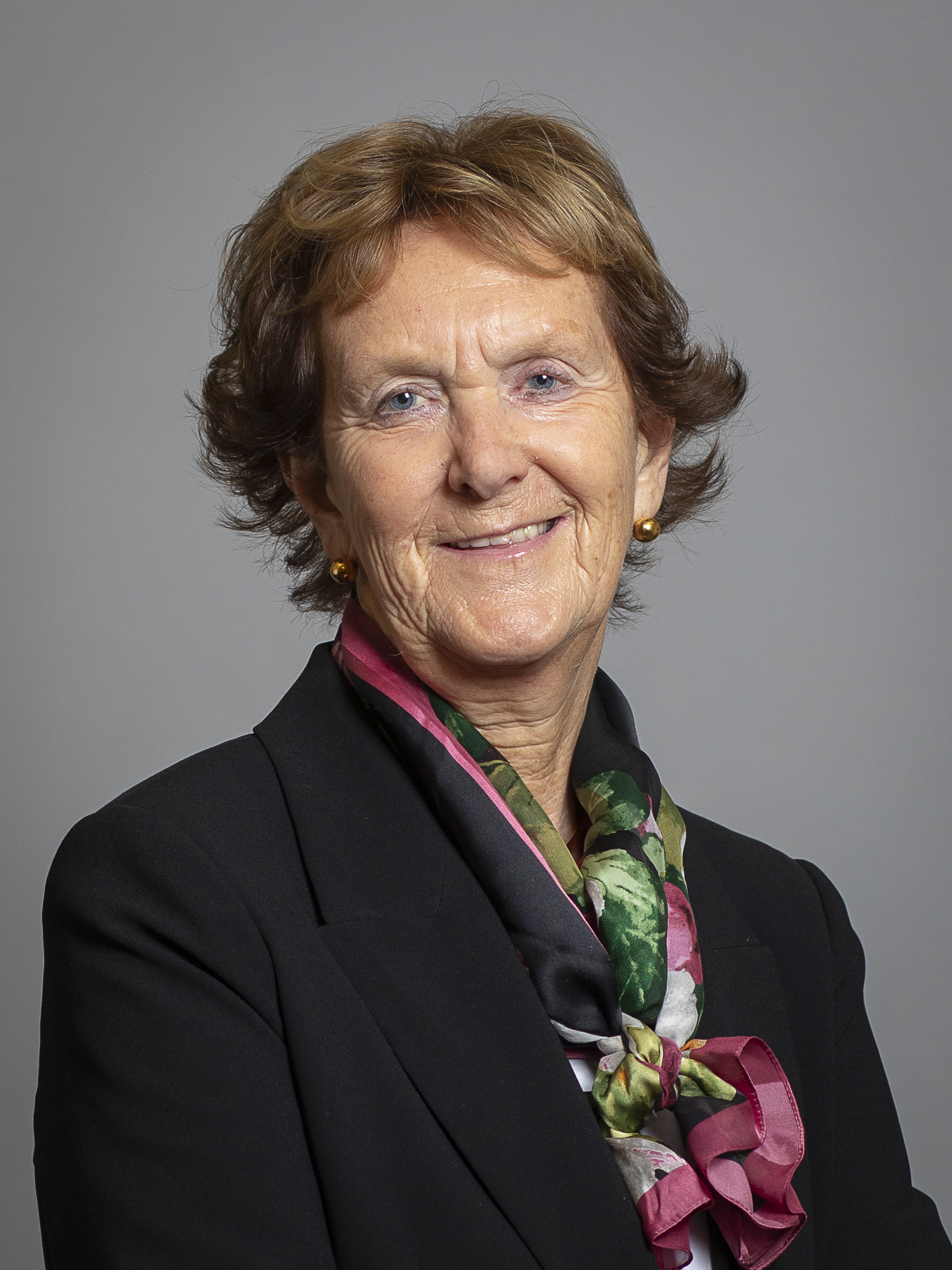
- Official portrait, 2020

Baroness-in-Waiting Government Whip
- Acting; 15 September 2021 – 4 February 2022 (Note: Served in position in an acting capacity during the maternity leave of Baroness Penn)
- Prime Minister: Boris Johnson
- Preceded by: Joanna Penn, Baroness Penn
- Succeeded by: Joanna Penn, Baroness Penn
- In office 12 August 2019 – 13 February 2020
- Prime Minister: Boris Johnson
- Preceded by: The Baroness Goldie
- Succeeded by: The Lord Parkinson of Whitley Bay
- In office 11 June 2017 – 29 March 2018
- Prime Minister: Theresa May
- Preceded by: The Lord O'Shaughnessy
- Succeeded by: The Baroness Manzoor
- In office 14 May 2015 – 21 December 2016
- Prime Minister: David Cameron; Theresa May
- Preceded by: The Baroness Williams of Trafford
- Succeeded by: The Lord O'Shaughnessy

Member of the House of Lords
- Lord Temporal
- Life peerage 16 September 2014

Personal details
- Born: 23 December 1951 (age 74)
- Party: Crossbencher (2022–present)
- Other political affiliations: Conservative (2014–2022)
- Spouse: Colin Chisholm (m. 1976)
- Children: 3
- Parent(s): John Wyndham, 1st Baron Egremont; Pamela Wyndham-Quin

Caroline Elizabeth Chisholm, Baroness Chisholm of Owlpen (born 23 December 1951), is a British life peeress and member of the House of Lords, where she currently sits as a non-affiliated member. In 2022, she was appointed as one of six Queen's companions to Queen Camilla.

== Life ==
The only daughter of John Wyndham, 1st Baron Egremont, and Pamela Wyndham, Lady Egremont, her elder brother, Max Egremont, succeeded to the family titles.

The Hon. Carlyn Wyndham married in 1976, Colin Chisholm, son of Archibald Chisholm CBE. They have two sons and one daughter.

She was made a life peer on 16 September 2014 as Baroness Chisholm of Owlpen, of Owlpen in the County of Gloucestershire. She sat in the House of Lords as a Conservative Party peer. She has been a baroness-in-waiting (a type of government whip) from 2015 to 2016, 2017 to 2018, 2019 to 2020, and 2021 to 2022. She was a Lords spokesperson for the Cabinet Office in 2016.

In 2022, she became one of the six ladies appointed as "Queen's companions" to Queen Camilla. At the same time, she resigned the Conservative whip to sit as a non-affiliated member.

With her husband, she was invited to ride in the King's procession at Royal Ascot 2023.

== Honours ==
Country	Date	Appointment	Ribbon
United Kingdom	6 May 2023	King Charles III Coronation Medal	

== See also ==
- Earl of Egremont
- Johnson ministry

== Notes ==
Orders of precedence in the United Kingdom
Preceded by The Baroness Harding of Winscombe	Ladies; Baroness Chisholm of Owlpen	Followed by The Baroness Shields
