= Wyndham House =

Wyndham House may refer to:

- Wyndham House, London
- Wyndham House, Oxford
