= Elizabeth Ilive =

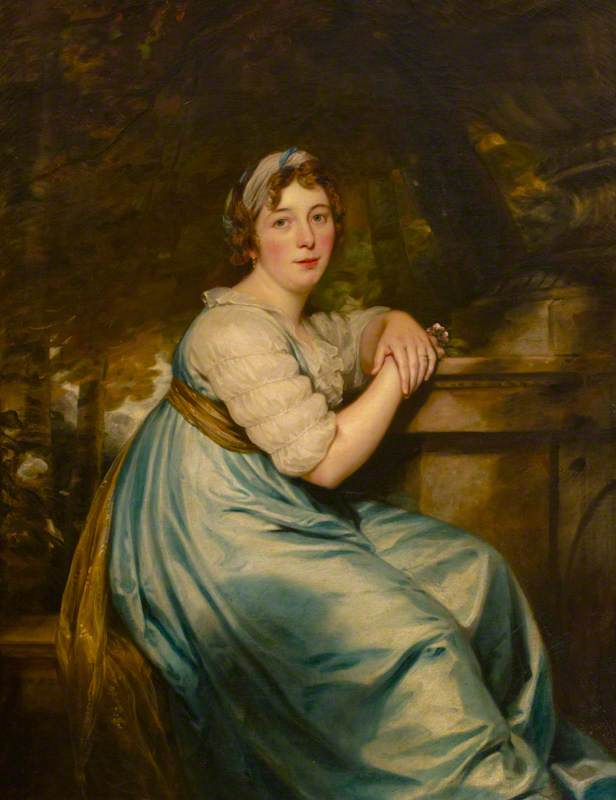
- portrait by Thomas Phillips
- Born: 1769
- Died: 30 December 1822
- Spouse: George Wyndham, 3rd Earl of Egremont
- Children: George Wyndham, 1st Baron Leconfield, Henry Wyndham, Charles Wyndham, Frances Wyndham, Charlotte Wyndham, Lady Elizabeth Wyndham

Elizabeth Wyndham (née Ilive or Iliffe; c.1769 – 30 December 1822), styled the Countess of Egerton after 1801, was an English polymath. She was given an award from the Royal Society of Arts for the design for a "cross-bar lever" that she had invented, for the purpose of lifting stones.

She was the mistress and later wife of George Wyndham, 3rd Earl of Egremont. She was the mother of eight of his children.

== Early life ==
Elizabeth Ilive came from Oxford, and her father may have been a printer and/or a master at Westminster School. Thomas Hamilton Ayliffe was her younger brother.

== Marriage and issue ==
Ilive became one of Wyndham's mistress in 1785. The earl lived openly with his various mistresses and acknowledged paternity of more than 40 illegitimate children.

They were married in 1801, but only one of their children, a daughter who died in infancy in 1803, was born in wedlock. Soon afterwards, the couple separated.

The children born to the couple prior to their marriage were:

- Colonel George Wyndham, 1st Baron Leconfield (1787–1869); George inherited his father's unentailed estates, including Petworth House in Sussex, Leconfield Castle in Yorkshire and Egremont Castle in Cumbria, in preference to the earl's nephew George Wyndham, 4th Earl of Egremont, who inherited the title. Colonel Wyndham was created Baron Leconfield in 1859. He married Mary Fanny Blunt, and had children, including Henry Wyndham, 2nd Baron Leconfield.
- Frances Wyndham Ilive (1789–1848), who married Sir Charles Burrell, 3rd Baronet, and had children.
- General Sir Henry Wyndham (1790–1860), who married Elizabeth Somerset but had no children.
- Edward Wyndham Ilive (1792–1792)
- William Wyndham Ilive (bapt. 13 September 1793 – bur. 20 February 1794)
- Charlotte Henrietta Wyndham Ilive (11 April 1795 – 1870), who married John James King, the son of John King, and had children.
- Colonel Charles Wyndham (1796–1866), who married Elizabeth Anne Hepburne-Scott, daughter of Lord Polwarth, but had no children.

== Scientific interests ==
In 1798, Elizabeth Ilive submitted to the Royal Society of Arts the design for a "cross-bar lever" that she had invented, for the purpose of lifting stones. This resulted in the award of a silver medal. A portrait of Elizabeth, by Thomas Phillips, RA, is held at her former home, Petworth House. It depicts Elizabeth with a diagram of her invention.

== Art ==
The artist William Blake lived near Petworth for a while, and Elizabeth is thought to have commissioned several works from him. The unnamed woman in Blake's Vision of the Last Judgment is believed to represent her.

Her husband, the earl, was a patron of J. M. W. Turner, and Elizabeth is believed to have assisted Turner with the creation of pigments in her own "laboratory". Evidence for this includes the existence of receipts for artists’ supplies, glass and earthenware retorts, imploding bottles, Magdeburg hemispheres, and yellow powder.
