= Henry Wyndham, 2nd Baron Leconfield =

British peer

The Right Honourable The Lord Leconfield JP DL
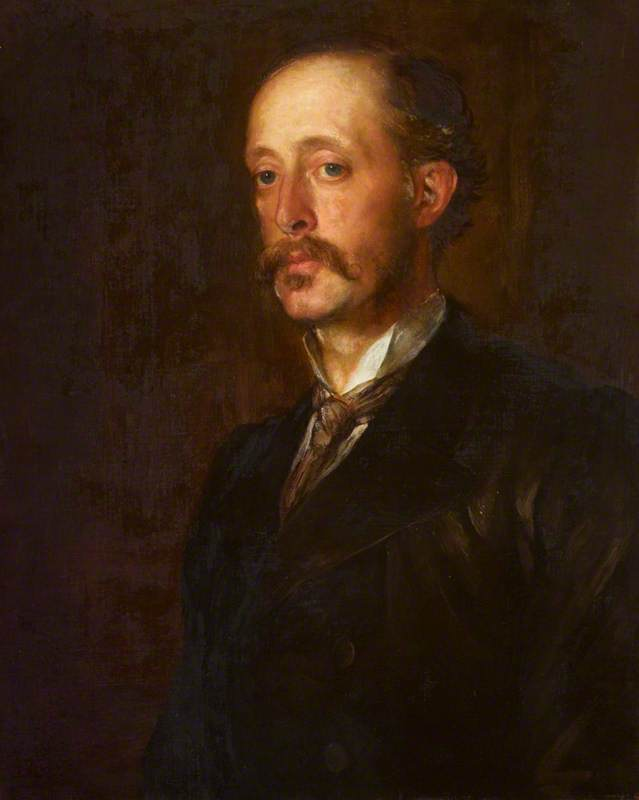
- Lord Leconfield by George Frederic Watts

Member of the House of Lords
- Lord Temporal
- In office 18 March 1869 – 6 January 1901
- Preceded by: The 1st Baron Leconfield
- Succeeded by: The 3rd Baron Leconfield

Personal details
- Born: Henry Wyndham; 31 July 1830
- Died: 6 January 1901 (aged 70)
- Party: Conservative

Henry Wyndham, 2nd Baron Leconfield (31 July 1830 – 6 January 1901), was a British peer and Conservative Member of Parliament.

== Early life and education ==
A direct descendant of Sir John Wyndham, Leconfield was the eldest surviving son of George Wyndham, 1st Baron Leconfield, and Mary Fanny Blunt. His father was the eldest natural son and adopted heir of George Wyndham, 3rd Earl of Egremont, and succeeded to the unentailed Egremont estates on his death, in 1837. George Wyndham was his nephew.

Leconfield was educated at Eton and Christ Church, Oxford. After leaving university, he joined the 1st Life Guards, from which he retired with the rank of captain.

== Career ==
Leconfield was elected to the House of Commons for West Sussex in 1854, a seat he held until he succeeded his father as second Baron in 1869 and entered the House of Lords. He was a Justice of the Peace (JP) and a Deputy Lieutenant (DL) for Sussex, and vice-chairman and alderman of the Western Division of the Sussex County Council.

== Marriage and children ==
Lord Leconfield married Lady Constance Primrose, daughter of Archibald Primrose, Lord Dalmeny, and sister of Prime Minister Archibald Primrose, 5th Earl of Rosebery, in 1867. They had six sons and three daughters:

- Lieutenant Hon. George O'Brien Wyndham (17 November 1868 – 13 January 1895)
- Hon. Mary Caroline Wyndham (17 November 1870 – 21 January 1944), married General Sir Ivor Maxse.
- Charles Henry Wyndham, 3rd Baron Leconfield (17 February 1872 – 17 April 1952)
- Hon. Maud Evelyn Wyndham (1 September 1874 – 22 July 1963), married Vincent Wodehouse Yorke and was the mother of Henry Vincent Yorke, better known as the novelist Henry Green.
- Lieutenant Hon. William Reginald Wyndham (16 March 1876 – 6 November 1914), killed in action on the Western Front and is buried at Zillebeke Churchyard Commonwealth War Graves Commission Cemetery in Belgium.
- Hugh Archibald Wyndham, 4th Baron Leconfield (4 October 1877 –- 6 July 1963)
- Hon. Margaret Blanche Wyndham (9 October 1879 – 26 February 1965)
- Edward Scawen Wyndham, 5th Baron Leconfield (30 April 1883 – 17 October 1967), father of John Wyndham, 6th Baron Leconfield and 1st Baron Egremont.
- Brigadier General Hon. Everard Humphrey Wyndham (4 December 1888 – 3 November 1970)

== Death ==
Lord Leconfield died at his town residence in Chesterfield Gardens, London, on 6 January 1901 at the age of 70. He was succeeded in the barony by his second but eldest surviving son Charles. Lady Leconfield died in 1939.

Parliament of the United Kingdom
Preceded by Earl of March; Richard Prime	Member of Parliament for West Sussex; 1854–1869; With: Earl of March 1854–1860; Walter Barttelot 1860–1869	Succeeded by Walter Barttelot; Earl of March
Peerage of the United Kingdom
Preceded by George Wyndham	Baron Leconfield; 1869–1901; Member of the House of Lords (1869–1901)	Succeeded by Charles Wyndham
