= John Wyndham, 1st Baron Egremont =

British peer, art collector and author

The Right Honourable The Lord Egremont MBE
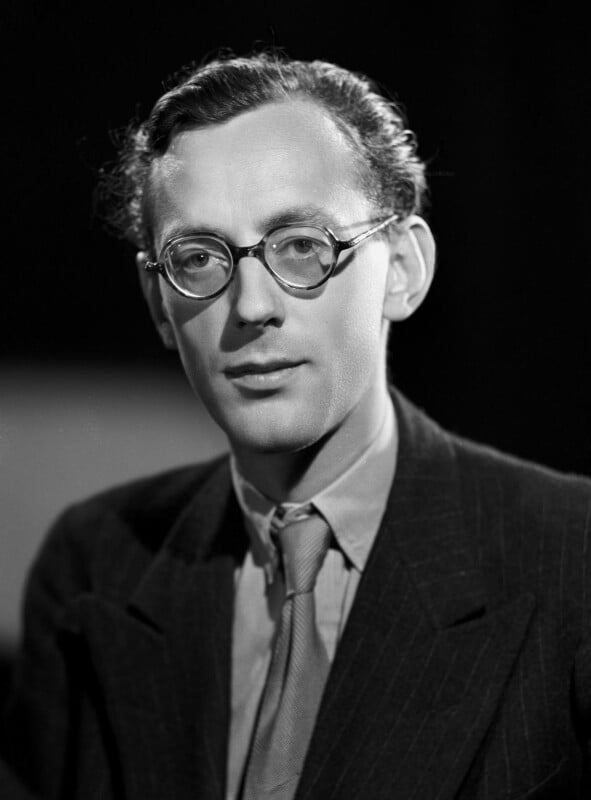
- Wyndham in 1947

Member of House of Lords
- Lord Temporal
- In office 29 November 1963 – 6 June 1972
- Preceded by: Peerage created
- Succeeded by: The 2nd Baron Egremont

Personal details
- Born: John Edward Reginald Wyndham; 5 June 1920
- Died: 6 June 1972 (aged 52)
- Occupation: Art collector, author, peer
- Other titles: 6th Baron Leconfield

Arms of Wyndham, Baron Leconfield and Egremont: Azure, a chevron between three lion's heads erased or a bordure wavy of the last. These are the arms of Wyndham of Orchard Wyndham, differenced by a bordure wavy, for the illegitimacy of the 1st Baron Leconfield.

John Edward Reginald Wyndham, 1st Baron Egremont, 6th Baron Leconfield (5 June 1920 – 6 June 1972), was a British hereditary peer, art collector and author.

== Early life and education ==
John Wyndham was the son of Edward Wyndham, 5th Baron Leconfield, and his wife Gladys Mary Farquhar, and was a direct descendant of Sir John Wyndham. He was educated at Eton College and the University of Cambridge.

== Career ==
He served as Private Secretary to Harold Macmillan in various appointments that the latter held between 1940 and 1945, then again in 1955 when Macmillan was Foreign Secretary, and finally during his time as prime minister from 1957 to 1963. He was also a Trustee of the Wallace Collection between 1953 and 1972.

In 1963, four years before succeeding his father as Baron Leconfield, he was raised to the peerage in his own right in Macmillan's resignation honours as Baron Egremont of Petworth in the County of Sussex. This was a revival of the Egremont title held by his ancestors the Earls of Egremont. He and his father took their seats in the House of Lords on the same day.

== Marriage and children ==
Lord Leconfield married his second cousin once removed, Pamela Wyndham-Quin (29 April 1925 – 4 November 2013), daughter of the Hon. Valentine Wyndham-Quin and great-granddaughter of the Hon. Blanche Julia Wyndham, (daughter of George Wyndham, 1st Baron Leconfield), in 1947. They had two sons and a daughter:

- John Max Henry Scawen Wyndham, 2nd Baron Egremont and 7th Baron Leconfield (born 21 April 1948)
- Hon. Caroline Elizabeth Wyndham (born 23 December 1951), married Colin Chisholm in 1976, created a life peer as Baroness Chisholm of Owlpen in 2014.
- Hon. Harry Hugh Patrick Wyndham (born 28 September 1957)

In 1952, he inherited significant property from his uncle, Charles Wyndham, 3rd Baron Leconfield. He and his bride moved into the magnificent Petworth House in West Sussex.

== Death ==
Lord Leconfield died of cancer in June 1972 at the age of 52. He was succeeded in the baronies by his eldest son Max who wrote the entry on him for the Dictionary of National Biography and dedicated his War Diaries (1984) to him. Lord Egremont himself wrote an engaging autobiography, Wyndham and Children First (Macmillan, London, 1968) which covers his service with Macmillan in North Africa during the Second World War.

== Notes ==
Peerage of the United Kingdom
New creation	Baron Egremont; 1963–1972; Member of the House of Lords (1963–1972)	Succeeded by Max Wyndham
Preceded by Edward Wyndham	Baron Leconfield; 1967–1972	Succeeded by Max Wyndham
