= Earl of Egremont =

Earldom in the Peerage of Great Britain

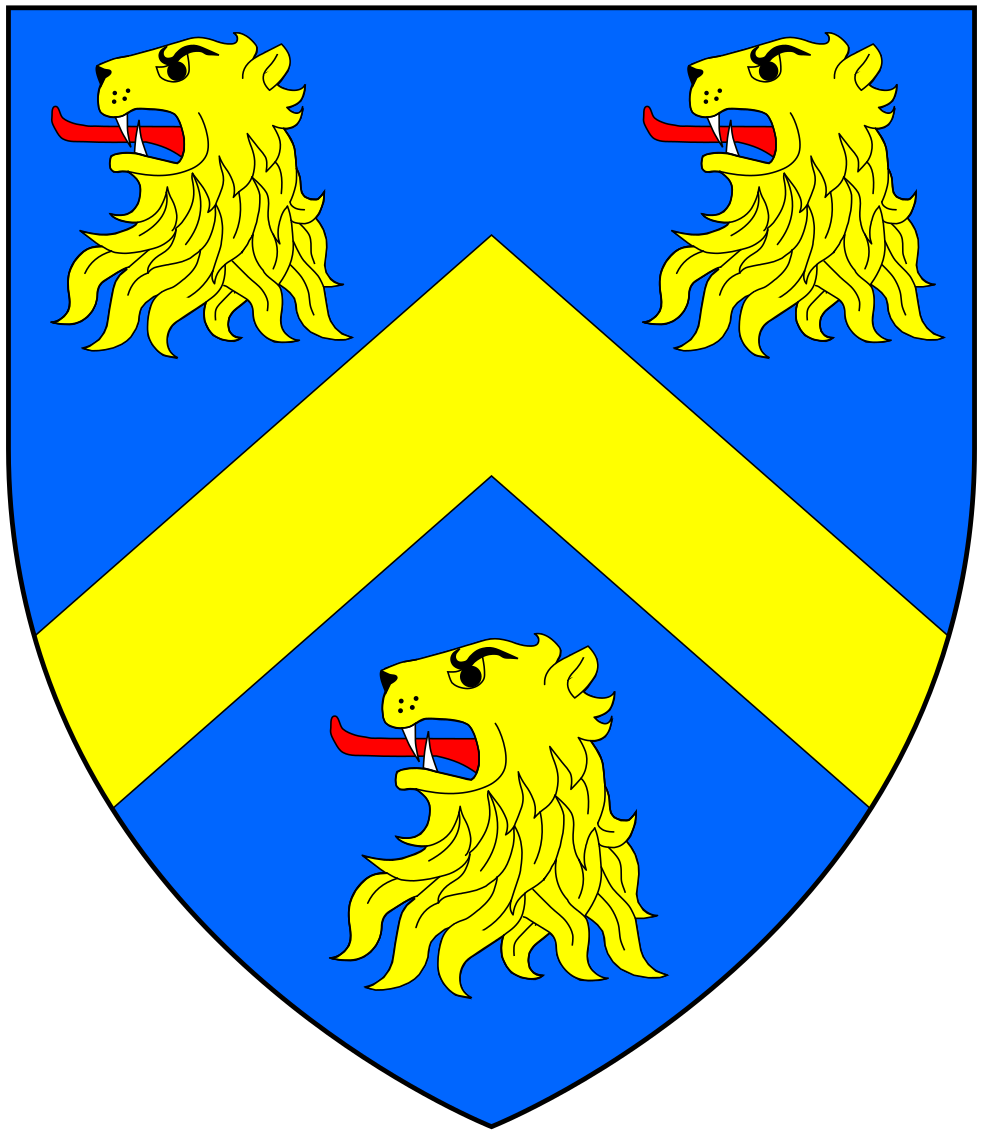
Undifferenced arms of Wyndham: Azure, a chevron between three lion's heads erased or. The Wyndham Barons Egremont and Leconfield bear these arms within a bordure wavy or for difference.

Earl of Egremont was a title in the Peerage of Great Britain. It was created in 1749, along with the subsidiary title Baron Cockermouth, in Cumberland, for Algernon Seymour, 7th Duke of Somerset, with remainder to his nephews Sir Charles Wyndham, 4th Baronet, of Orchard Wyndham, and Percy Wyndham-O'Brien. The Duke had previously inherited the Percy estates, including the lands of Egremont in Cumberland, from his mother Lady Elizabeth Percy, daughter and heiress of Joceline Percy, 11th Earl of Northumberland. In 1750 Sir Charles Wyndham succeeded according to the special remainder as 2nd Earl of Egremont on the death of his uncle. His younger brother Percy Wyndham-O'Brien was created Earl of Thomond in 1756.

The Wyndham baronetcy, of Orchard Wyndham in the County of Somerset, had been created in the Baronetage of England in 1661 for William Wyndham, who represented Somerset and Taunton in Parliament. His son, Sir Edward Wyndham, 2nd Baronet, represented Ilchester in the House of Commons. He was succeeded by his only son, Sir William Wyndham, 3rd Baronet, a prominent politician who notably served as Chancellor of the Exchequer. He married Lady Catherine Seymour, daughter of Charles Seymour, 6th Duke of Somerset. His eldest son was the 4th Baronet, who succeeded as 2nd Earl of Egremont in 1750.

The 2nd Earl's eldest son and successor, George Wyndham, 3rd Earl of Egremont, was known as a patron of art. He also sponsored the Petworth Emigration Scheme, which sent thousands of working-class people from the south of England to Upper Canada between 1832 and 1837. On his death the titles passed to his nephew, George Wyndham, 4th Earl of Egremont. When he died in 1845 the barony of Cockermouth and earldom of Egremont became extinct. The large Wyndham estates, including Petworth House in Sussex had already passed to Colonel George Wyndham. He was the natural son and adopted heir of the 3rd Earl. In 1859 he was raised to the peerage in his own right as Baron Leconfield. Moreover, in 1963 the Egremont title was revived for his great-great-grandson John Wyndham, who was created Baron Egremont, of Petworth in the County of Sussex. In 1967 he succeeded his father as sixth Baron Leconfield.

Another member of the Wyndham family was Thomas Wyndham, 1st Baron Wyndham, Lord Chancellor of Ireland from 1726 to 1739. He was the grandson of Sir Wadham Wyndham, uncle of Sir William Wyndham, 1st Baronet, of Orchard Wyndham. The Wyndham family inherited much land from their Wadham connection on the death of Nicholas Wadham, co-founder of Wadham College, Oxford.

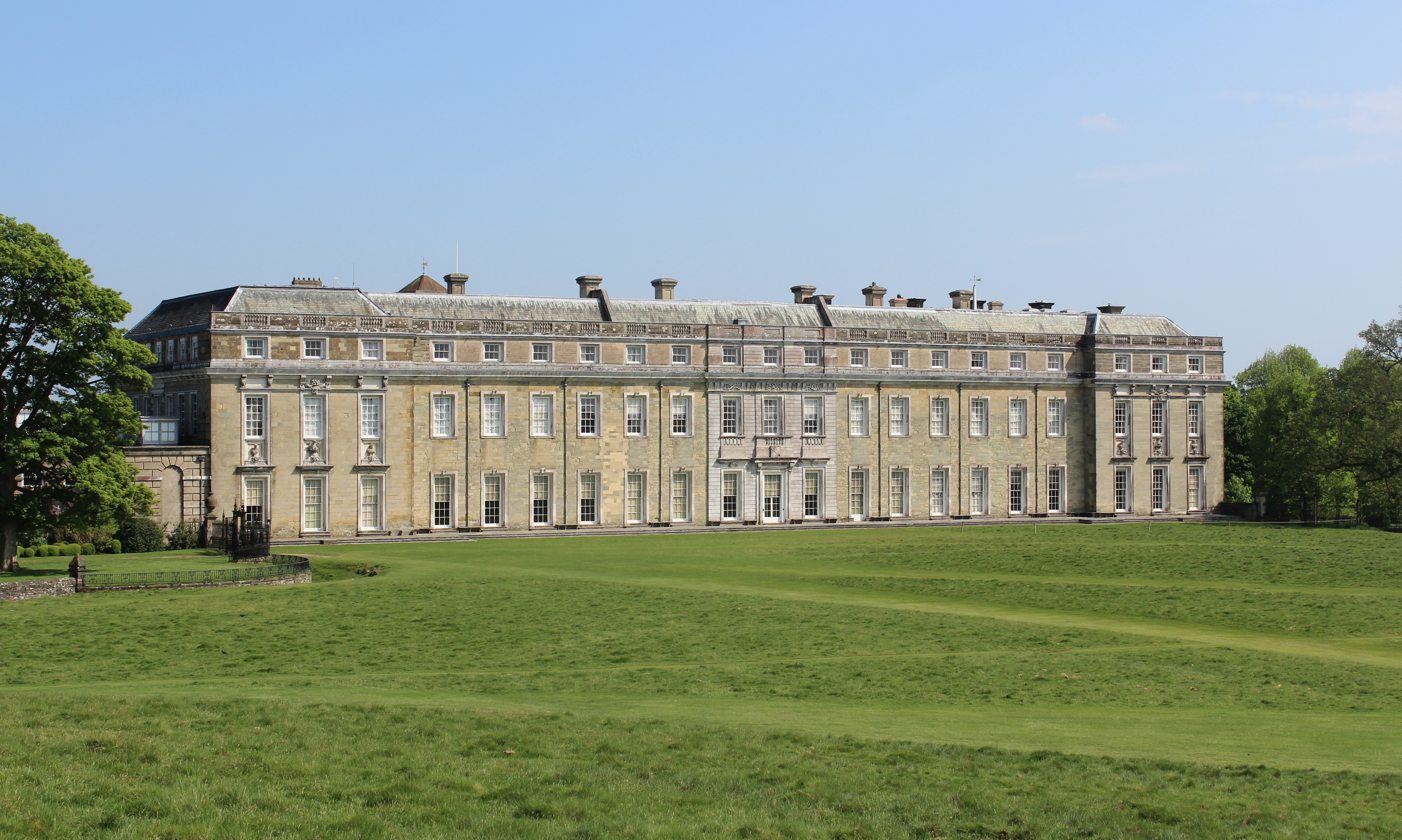
Petworth House, West Sussex

== Baron Egremont; first creation (1449) ==
- Thomas Percy, 1st Baron Egremont (1422–1460)

== Wyndham baronets, of Orchard Wyndham (1661) ==
- Sir William Wyndham, 1st Baronet (c. 1632 – 1683)
- Sir Edward Wyndham, 2nd Baronet (c. 1667 – 1695)
- Sir William Wyndham, 3rd Baronet (1687–1740)
- Sir Charles Wyndham, 4th Baronet (1710–1763) (succeeded as Earl of Egremont in 1750)

=== Earl of Egremont (1749) ===
- Algernon Seymour, 7th Duke of Somerset, 1st Earl of Egremont (1684–1750)
- Charles Wyndham, 2nd Earl of Egremont (1710–1763)
- George O'Brien Wyndham, 3rd Earl of Egremont (1751–1837)
- George Francis Wyndham, 4th Earl of Egremont (1785–1845)

=== Barons Egremont, second creation (1963) ===
- See Baron Leconfield

== See also ==
- Duke of Somerset
- Baron Leconfield
- Earl of Thomond
- Baron Wyndham
- George Wyndham
- Wyndham baronets
