= Pamela Wyndham, Baroness Egremont =

British socialite (1925–2013)

The Right Honourable The Lady Egremont
- Born: Pamela Wyndham-Quin; 29 April 1925; Paddington, London, England
- Died: 4 November 2013 (aged 88)
- Occupations: Society hostess and traveller
- Known for: Worked at Bletchley Park during the Second World War
- Spouse: John Wyndham, 1st Baron Egremont
- Children: 3, including Max and Carlyn
- Relatives: Windham Wyndham-Quin, 5th Earl of Dunraven and Mount-Earl (grandfather); E. G. Pretyman (grandfather)

Pamela Wyndham, Baroness Egremont (née Wyndham-Quin; 29 April 1925 – 4 November 2013), was a British society hostess and traveller, who worked at Bletchley Park during the Second World War, before marrying her cousin John Wyndham, 1st Baron Egremont.

== Early life ==
She was born Pamela Wyndham-Quin on 29 April 1925 at 66 Oxford Terrace, Paddington, London, the third and youngest daughter of Royal Navy Captain Valentine Maurice Wyndham-Quin (1890–1983), and his wife, Marjorie Elizabeth Wyndham-Quin, née Pretyman (1897–1969). Her father was the younger son of Windham Wyndham-Quin, 5th Earl of Dunraven and Mount-Earl, and her mother was the daughter of Ernest George Pretyman, a Conservative Party politician and MP, and a former Civil Lord of the Admiralty. She was educated at home by a long series of governesses, and had two older sisters, Ursula and Mollie.

== Career ==
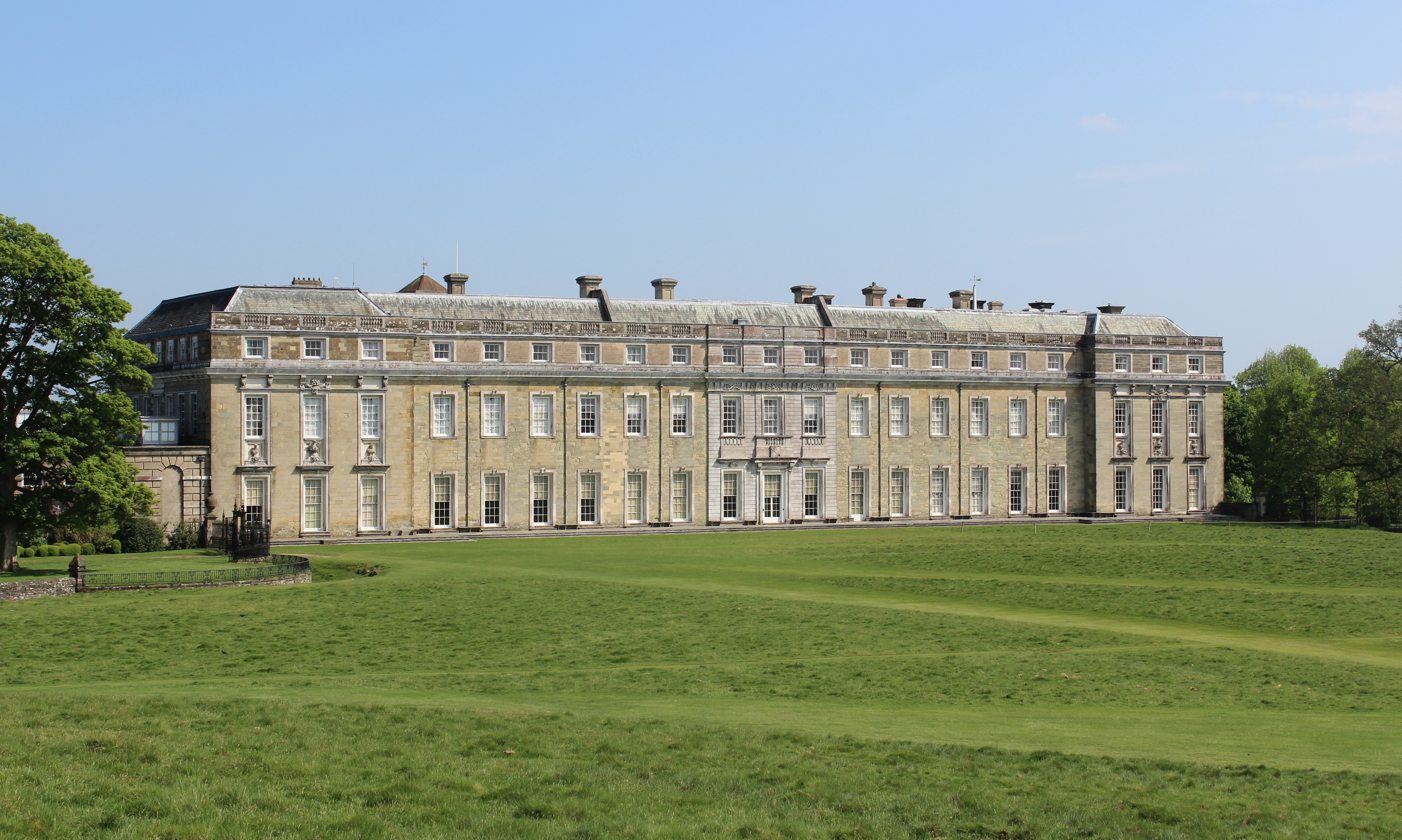
Petworth House

At the start of the Second World War, Wyndham joined the Women's Royal Naval Service, who seconded her to Bletchley Park to "work on secret decoding operations", thanks to her abilities with foreign languages, and she was based nearby at Woburn Abbey. Near the end of the war, her father was appointed British naval attaché in Argentina, and she went with him.

After her marriage in 1947, she became a well-known society beauty and hostess, principally at Petworth House.

== Personal life ==
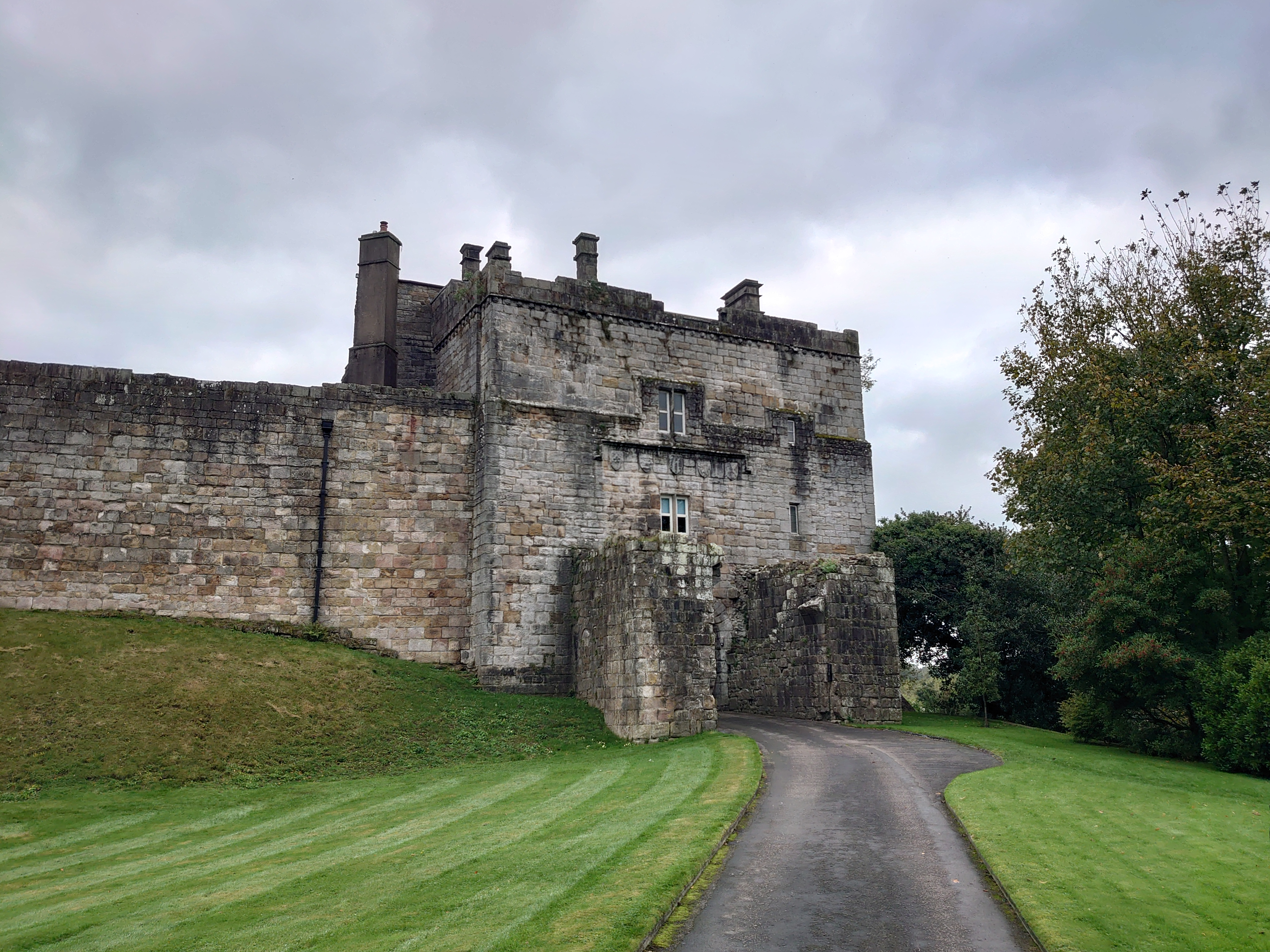
Cockermouth Castle in 2024

Not long after returning to the UK, she met John Wyndham, 1st Baron Egremont, her second cousin once removed, and a nephew to Charles Wyndham, 3rd Baron Leconfield. He was also heir to Petworth House, a 17th-century house with an extensive art collection which included 20 Turner paintings, as well as land in Sussex and Cumbria. He was not able to serve in the armed forces due to poor eyesight, and had spent the war working for Harold Macmillan, a connection that was to continue until his death in 1972.

They married in 1947, when he was employed in the Conservative Research Department, and resided in London until 1952, when Lord Leconfield died, and they moved into Petworth House. In 1963, her husband was created Lord Egremont in Macmillan's retirement honours list, reviving an old family title. In 1967, he became the 6th Baron Leconfield in 1967 (the title having passed rapidly through two uncles and onto his father). He died of cancer in 1972, aged 52.

In 1978, she handed over the running of Petworth to their elder son, Max Wyndham, 2nd Baron Egremont (also known as the author Max Egremont), and moved to the family estate of Cockermouth Castle in Cumbria, where she restored the interiors and rejuvenated the gardens, and kept her house in Pimlico, London.

They had two sons and a daughter, Carlyn Chisholm, Baroness Chisholm of Owlpen.

== Later life ==
She died on 4 November 2013.
