= Baron Leconfield =

Barony in the Peerage of the United Kingdom

Arms of Wyndham, Baron Leconfield and Egremont: Azure, a chevron between three lion's heads erased or a bordure wavy of the last. These are the arms of Wyndham of Orchard Wyndham, differenced by a bordure wavy, for the illegitimacy of the 1st Baron Leconfield.

Baron Leconfield, of Leconfield, in the East Riding of the County of York, is a title in the Peerage of the United Kingdom. It was created in 1859 for Col. George Wyndham (1787–1869). He was the eldest illegitimate son and adopted heir of George Wyndham, 3rd Earl of Egremont (1751–1837), by Elizabeth Ilive, his future wife (see Earl of Egremont for earlier history of the family), from whom he inherited Petworth House in Sussex, Egremont Castle and Cockermouth Castle in Cumbria and Leconfield Castle in Yorkshire, all formerly lands of Josceline Percy, 11th Earl of Northumberland (1644–1670), inherited by Charles Seymour, 6th Duke of Somerset (1662–1748), on his marriage to the Percy heiress Elizabeth Percy (1667–1722) and inherited as one of the co-heirs of his son Algernon Seymour, 7th Duke of Somerset, 1st Earl of Egremont (1684–1750), by the latter's nephew Sir Charles Wyndham, 4th Baronet (1710–1763), of Orchard Wyndham in Somerset, who inherited by special remainder the earldom of Egremont.

The 1st Baron's eldest son, the second Baron, represented West Sussex in the House of Commons as a Conservative. He was succeeded by his eldest son, the third Baron, who served as Lord Lieutenant of Sussex from 1917 to 1949. The latter's nephew, the sixth Baron, served as Private Secretary to Prime Minister Harold Macmillan from 1957 to 1963. In 1963, four years before he succeeded his father in the barony of Leconfield, the Egremont title held by his ancestors was revived when he was raised to the peerage as Baron Egremont, of Petworth in the County of Sussex. As of 2017 the titles are held by his son, the seventh Baron. Known as Max Egremont, he is a biographer and novelist.

The Hon. Percy Wyndham, younger son of the first Baron, was a Conservative politician and member of The Souls. He was the father of the Conservative politician and man of letters George Wyndham and of the soldier Guy Wyndham.

The family seat is Petworth House in Petworth, West Sussex.

== Barons Leconfield (1859) ==
- George Wyndham, 1st Baron Leconfield (1787–1869)
  - George William Wyndham (1817–1837)
- Henry Wyndham, 2nd Baron Leconfield (1830–1901)
  - Lt. George O'Brien Wyndham (1868–1895)
- Charles Wyndham, 3rd Baron Leconfield (1872–1952)
- Hugh Wyndham, 4th Baron Leconfield (1877–1963)
- Edward Wyndham, 5th Baron Leconfield (1883–1967)
- John Wyndham, 6th Baron Leconfield (1920–1972) (created Baron Egremont in 1963)
- (John) Max Wyndham, 7th Baron Leconfield, 2nd Baron Egremont (b. 1948)

The heir apparent is the present holder's son, the Hon. George Ronan Valentine Wyndham (b. 1983)

=== Title succession chart ===
Title succession chart, Barons Leconfield and Barons Egremont (second creation.

George Wyndham; 1st Baron Leconfield; 1787–1869
George Wyndham; 1817–1837	Henry Wyndham; 2nd Baron Leconfield; 1830–1901
Lt. Hon. George Wyndham; 1868–1895	Charles Wyndham; 3rd Baron Leconfield; 1872–1952	Lt. Hon. William Wyndham; 1876–1914	Hugh Wyndham; 4th Baron Leconfield; 1877–1963	Edward Wyndham; 5th Baron Leconfield; 1883–1967
Baron Egremont
Henry Wyndham; 1915–1942	John Wyndham; 6th Baron Leconfield; 1st Baron Egremont; 1920–1972
Max Wyndham; 7th Baron Leconfield; 2nd Baron Egremont born 1948
Hon. George Wyndham born 1983

=== Line of succession ===
Note: numbers 5–8 are in the line of succession to the Leconfield barony only.

- George Wyndham, 1st Baron Leconfield (1787–1869)
  - Henry Wyndham, 2nd Baron Leconfield (1830–1901)
    - Charles Henry Wyndham, 3rd Baron Leconfield (1872–1952)
    - Hugh Archibald Wyndham, 4th Bacon Leconfield (1877–1963)
    - Edward Scawen Wyndham, 5th Baron Leconfield (1883–1967)
      - John Edward Reginald Wyndham, 6th Baron Leconfield, 1st Baron Egremont (1920–1973)
        - (John) Max Henry Scawen Wyndham, 7th Baron Leconfield, 2nd Baron Egremont (born 1948)
          - (1,1) Hon. George Ronan Valentine Wyndham (b. 1983)
        - (2,2) Hon. Harry Hugh Patrick Wyndham (b. 1957)
          - (3,3) Alexander Wyndham (b. 1986)
          - (4,4) Richard Wyndham (b. 1990)
      - Hon. Mark Hugh Wyndham (1921–2008)
        - (5) Henry Mark Wyndham (b. 1953)
          - (6) Edward Francis Reginald Wyndham (b. 1983)
          - (7) Leo David Wyndham (b. 1985)
          - (8) William Henry Wyndham (b. 1988)

== See also ==
- Earl of Egremont
