= James O'Shaughnessy, Baron O'Shaughnessy =

British politician (born 1976)

The Right Honourable The Lord O'Shaughnessy
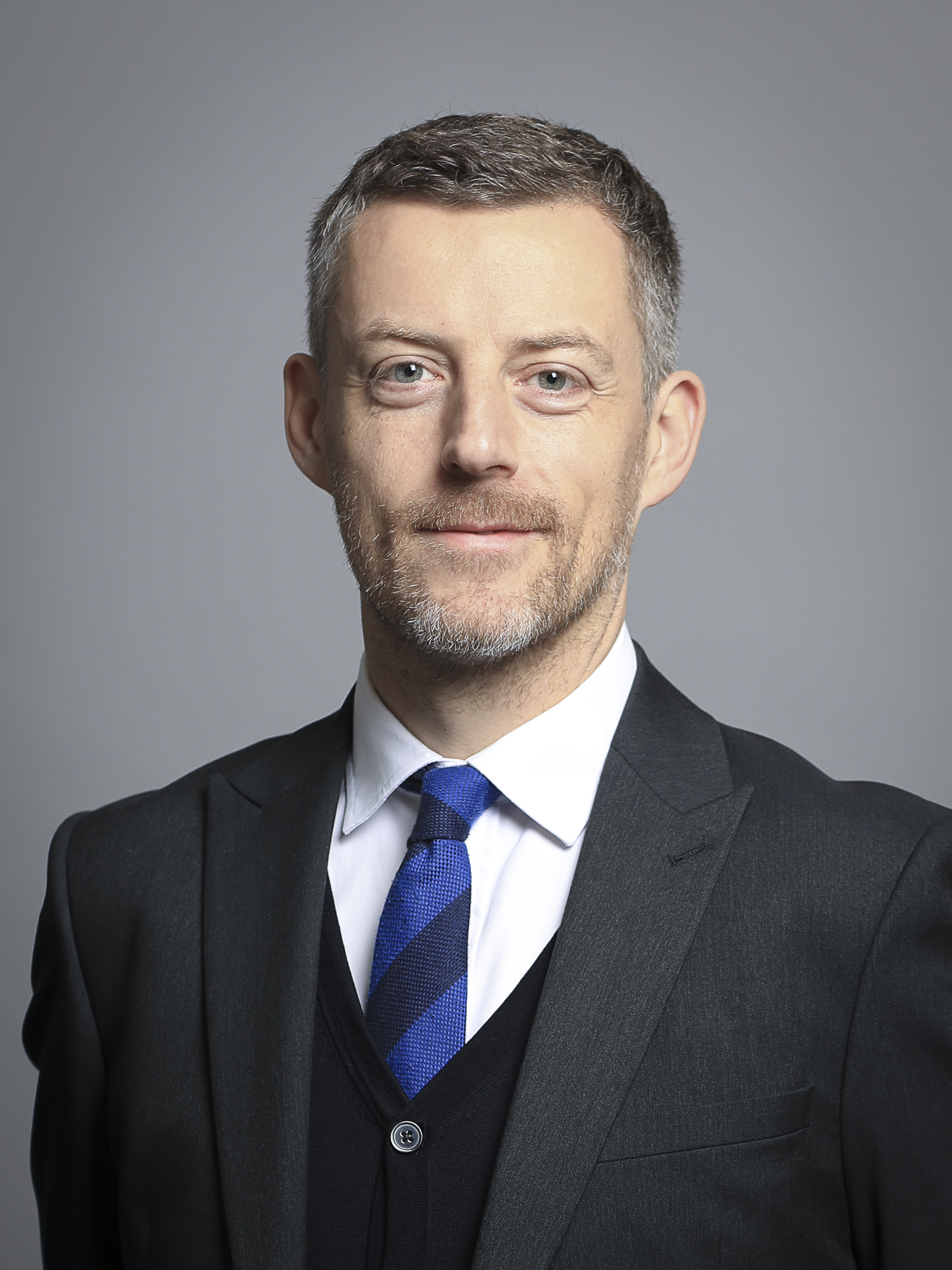

Parliamentary Under-Secretary of State for Health
- In office 21 December 2016 – 31 December 2018
- Prime Minister: Theresa May
- Preceded by: The Baron Prior of Brampton
- Succeeded by: The Baroness Blackwood of North Oxford

Lord-in-Waiting Government Whip
- In office 21 December 2016 – 11 June 2017
- Prime Minister: Theresa May
- Preceded by: The Baroness Chisholm of Owlpen
- Succeeded by: The Baroness Chisholm of Owlpen

Member of the House of Lords
- Lord Temporal
- Life peerage 1 October 2015

Personal details
- Born: 26 March 1976 (age 50) Taplow, Buckinghamshire
- Party: Conservative
- Education: St Hugh's College, Oxford

James Richard O'Shaughnessy, Baron O'Shaughnessy (born 26 March 1976) is a British Conservative politician and member of the House of Lords. He is the current Chair of Cambridge University Health Partners. He authored the 2010 Conservative Party Manifesto, was Director of the Number 10 Policy Unit and served as a Minister at the Department of Health and Social Care. O'Shaughnessy is now a senior partner at Newmarket Strategy, a medical consultancy which he co-founded in 2021.

== Biography ==
O'Shaughnessy was born on 26 March 1976 in Taplow, Buckinghamshire, England. He was educated in Berkshire at Claires Court School and then Wellington College. He went up to St Hugh's College, Oxford to read philosophy, politics and economics, graduating in 1998 with a Bachelor of Arts (BA) degree: as per tradition, his BA was promoted to a Master of Arts (MA Oxon) degree.

O'Shaughnessy worked at Policy Exchange, where he wrote a number of papers on education policy – including a 2005 paper outlining proposals for a pupil premium for disadvantaged children, which was picked up by both the Conservatives and Liberal Democrats in the Coalition government. He was Director of the Conservative Research Department from 2007 to 2010, succeeding George Bridges, Baron Bridges of Headley, and authored the Conservative Party’s general election manifesto.

A former Downing Street aide, he was Director of the Number 10 Policy Unit under Prime Minister David Cameron from May 2010 to October 2011. Following the general election in May that year, he led the development and implementation of the Programme for Government in the Cameron–Clegg coalition between the Conservatives and Liberal Democrats.

Created a life peer on 1 October 2015, he took the title Baron O'Shaughnessy, of Maidenhead in the Royal County of Berkshire. He made his maiden speech on 26 November 2015 during a debate on freedom of speech at universities. He served as a Lord-in-Waiting (i.e. Government Whip in the House of Lords) from 21 December 2016 to 11 June 2017 and as Parliamentary Under Secretary of State at the Department of Health and Social Care from 21 December 2016 until 31 December 2018. As Minister his responsibilities included implementing the Life Science Industrial Strategy, delivering a new pricing scheme with the pharmaceutical industry and chairing the National Genomics Board.

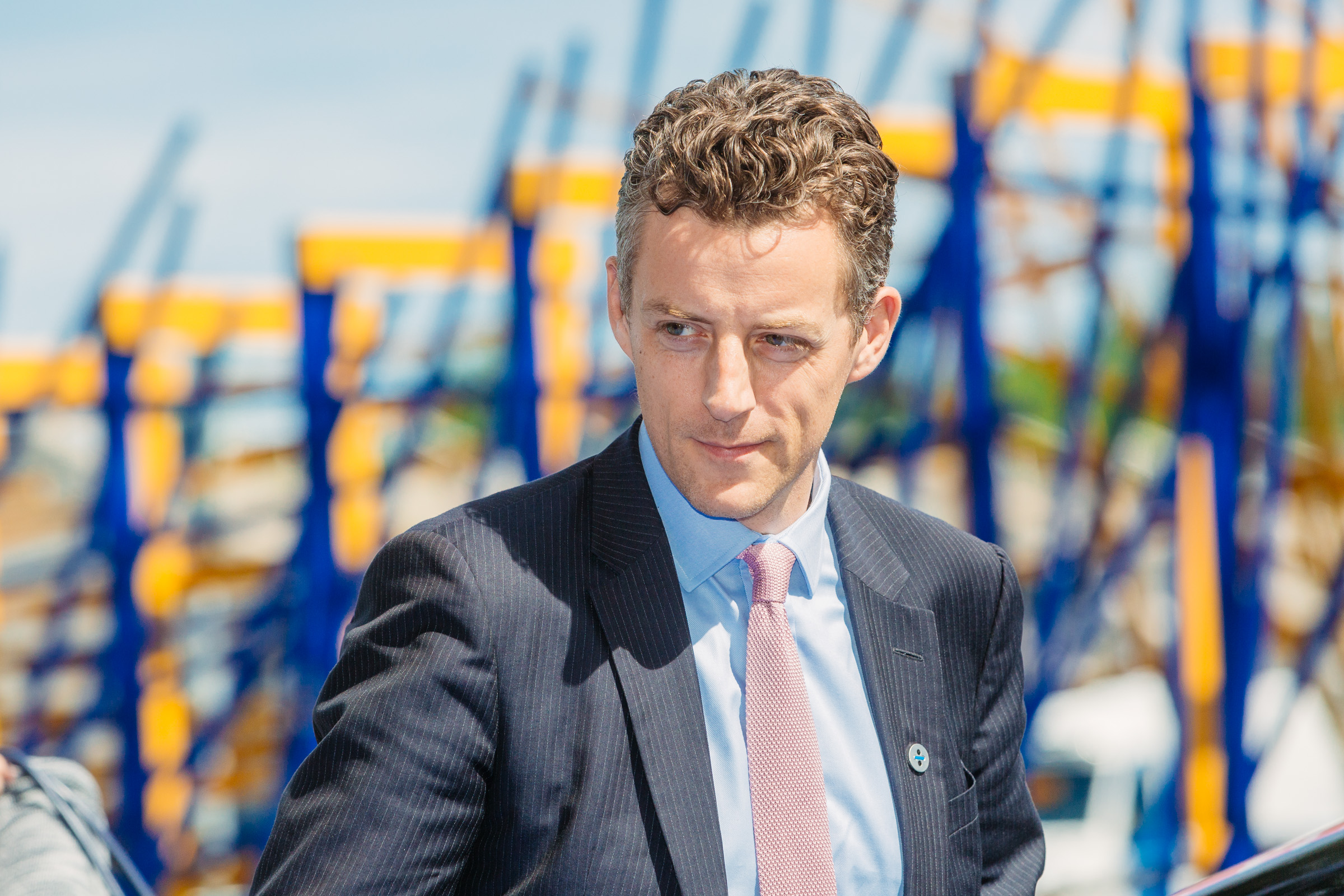
Lord O'Shaughnessy at a meeting of European Health Ministers, July 2017

In March 2021, Lord O'Shaughnessy co-founded Newmarket Strategy, a medical consultancy. He is a board member of Health Data Research UK, a Visiting Professor at Imperial College London's Institute of Global Health Innovation, and a Senior Research Fellow in Education at the Jubilee Centre at the University of Birmingham. O'Shaughnessy is also Patron and Strategic Adviser to the Tessa Jowell Brain Cancer Mission. He is a member of the University of Cambridge Centre for Science and Policy Advisory Council.

In May 2023, he published the O'Shaughnessy Review of Commercial Clinical Trials in the United Kingdom, which was commissioned by HM Government in February of that year.

== See also ==
- Burke's Peerage & Baronetage
- Policy Exchange

Orders of precedence in the United Kingdom
| Preceded by The Lord Arbuthnot of Edrom | Gentlemen; Baron O'Shaughnessy | Followed by The Lord Polak |
