= George Wyndham, 4th Earl of Egremont =

English nobleman (1768–1845)

Captain The Right Honourable The Earl of Egremont
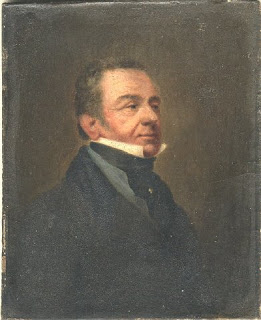
- 4th Earl of Egremont, miniature portrait circa 1843, private collection
- Born: 30 August 1786
- Died: 2 April 1845 (aged 58)
- Title: 4th Earl of Egremont
- Spouse: Jane Roberts (m. 1820)
- Parents: William Frederick Wyndham (father); Frances Mary Harford (mother)

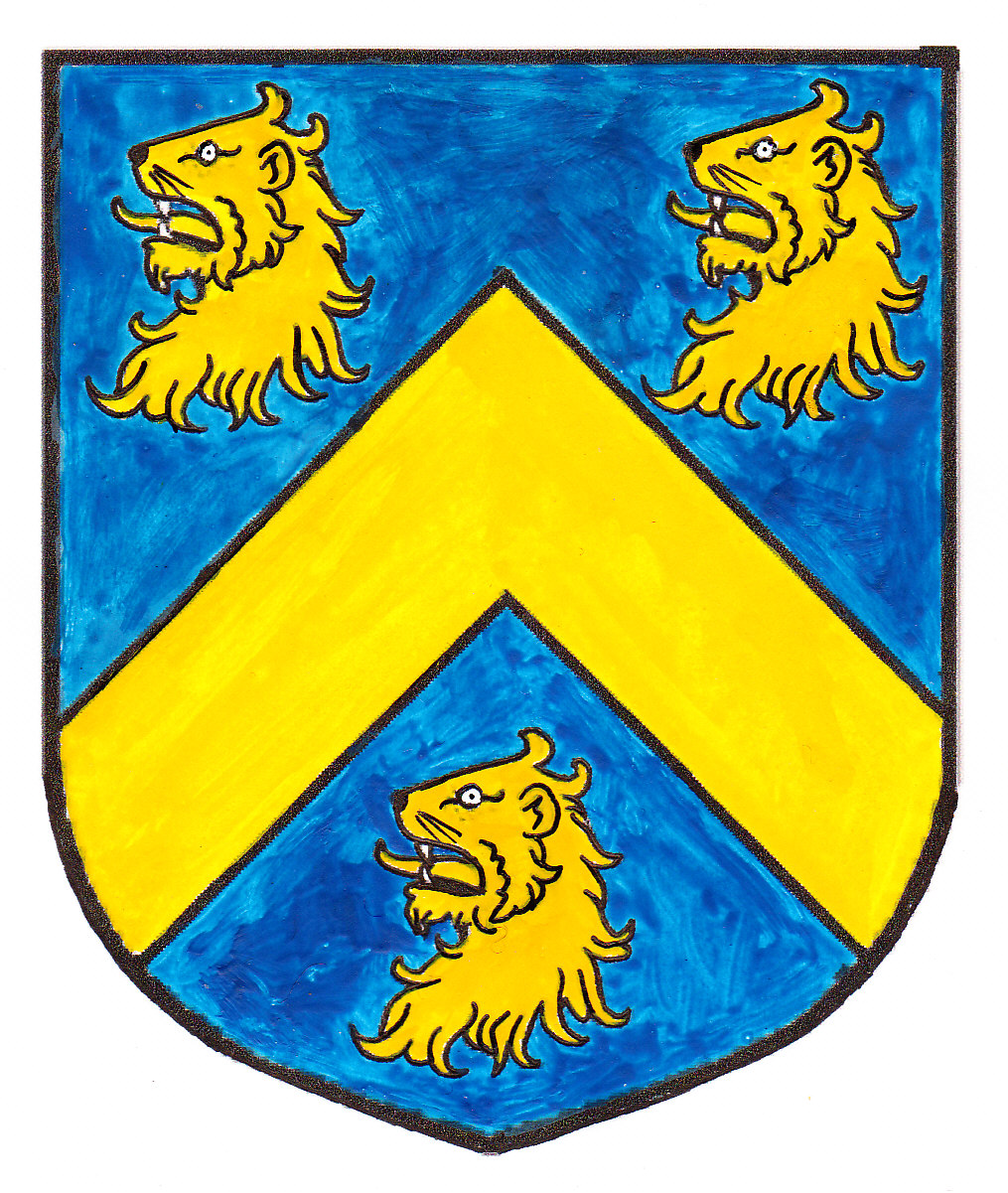
Arms of Wyndham: Azure, a chevron between three lion's heads erased or

George Francis Wyndham, 4th Earl of Egremont (30 August 1786 – 2 April 1845) of Orchard Wyndham, Somerset and Silverton Park, Devon, was an English nobleman and naval officer.

== Origins ==
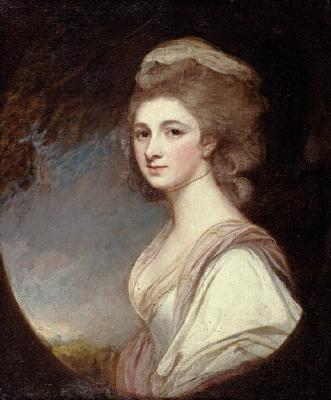
Wyndham's mother, Frances Harford, painted by George Romney in 1785

He was the son of William Frederick Wyndham (1763–1828), youngest son of Charles Wyndham, 2nd Earl of Egremont (1710–1763) and his wife Frances Mary Harford (1759–1822), the illegitimate daughter of Frederick Calvert, 6th Baron Baltimore, by Mrs. Hester Whelan.

== Inheritance ==
His father's elder brother, George Wyndham, 3rd Earl of Egremont (1751–1837), of Petworth House, Sussex, died without legitimate male issue and so George Francis Wyndham as the heir male succeeded him as Earl of Egremont (and Baron Wyndham and Baron Cockermouth). Perhaps to his surprise, and certainly disappointment, he did not however inherit the great estate and mansion of Petworth (inherited by the 2nd Earl ultimately from the ancient and noble Percy family), which the 3rd Earl bequeathed instead to his natural son Colonel George Wyndham, created Baron Leconfield in 1859.

== Career ==
George Francis received his first Royal Navy commission in 1799, rising to captain in 1812.

== Buildings ==
The 4th Earl's principal residence was at Orchard Wyndham, Watchet, in Somerset, the ancient seat of the Wyndham family since the 16th century. He was a prolific builder and early patron of the architect James Thomas Knowles (senior) (1806–1884) and built the following:

- Blackborough House, in the parish of Blackborough, Devon, near Kentisbeare, commenced in 1838 to the design of John Thomas Knowles (senior) but never completed. Italian Renaissance or "Tuscan" in style. It is now semi-derelict and surrounded by a scrap yard.
- All Saints Church, Blackborough, 1838, to the design of John Thomas Knowles (senior).
- Silverton Park in the parish of Silverton, Devon, 1838 to the design of John Thomas Knowles (senior). Neo-classical or "Grecian", unusual in being "entirely clothed in colonnades"(Pevsner). Demolished 1901. It has been suggested that the 4th Earl had commenced the building of Blackbourough House as a secondary seat (from which on occasion he could supervise his Devon estates), with the assumption that Petworth would descend to him at his uncle's death as his principal seat. When that did not occur he determined that Blackborough would not be sufficiently grand as a principal seat and so commenced the building of the more palatial Silverton Park.
- Kentisbeare House, in the parish of Kentisbeare, Devon, built in 1841 as the rectory (to house his brother-in-law, the Rev. R.A. Roberts, and his sister who had no children.) to the design of John Thomas Knowles (senior).
- Prispen House, Silverton, built in 1839 as the new rectory of Silverton, for which the old rectory was demolished, to the design of Richard Carver. As patron he installed in it as rector his friend Rev. Charles Tripp, the son of Rev. John Tripp (d.1814), rector of Sutton, near Petworth, by his wife Sarah Burchill, said to have been an illegitimate daughter of the 2nd Earl. Charles's brother was Henry Tripp (d.1835), a barrister of the Middle Temple who resided at the Wyndham seat of Orchard Wyndham. Prispen House burnt down in 1990.

== Marriage ==
On 14 November 1820 he married Jane Roberts (died 1876), third daughter of Rev. William Roberts, vice-provost of Eton College; but left no surviving issue.

== Death and succession ==
He died on 2 April 1845 at Silverton Park, without issue and his titles thus became extinct. Under his will, his heir for her life was his widow who died in 1876, and in remainder thereafter to his cousin, William IV Wyndham (1769–1841) of Dinton, Wiltshire, who shared common descent from Sir John Wyndham (1558–1645) of Orchard Wyndham, Somerset. William IV had died in 1841, four years before the Earl's death, but his heir in 1876 became William IV's grandson, William VI Wyndham (1834–1914) of Dinton, who thus inherited the ancient family manor of Orchard Wyndham in Somerset.

== Sources ==
- George Francis Wyndham, 4th Earl of Egremont at thePeerage.com

Peerage of Great Britain
Preceded by George Wyndham	Earl of Egremont; 1837–1845	Extinct
