= George Wyndham, 3rd Earl of Egremont =

English peer, landowner and art collector (1751-1837)

The Right Honourable The Earl of Egremont FRS
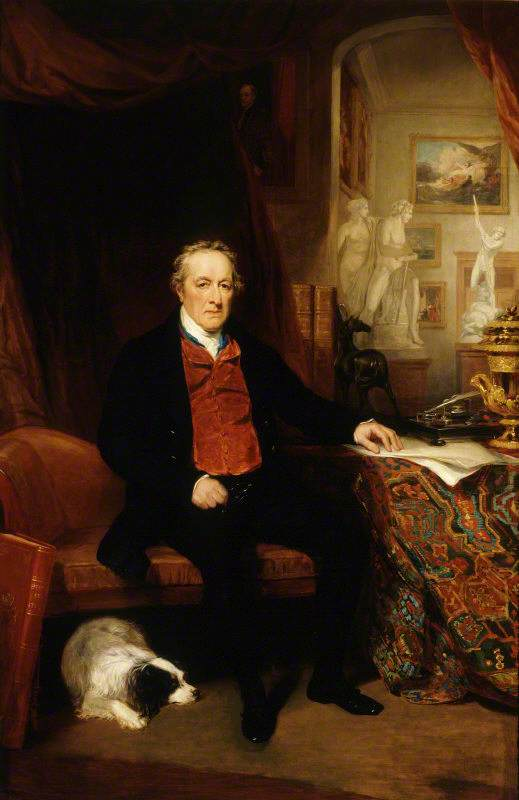
- Portrait of the Earl of Egremont by Thomas Phillips, 1839
- Born: 18 December 1751; Petworth House, Sussex, England
- Died: 11 November 1837 (aged 85); Petworth House, West Sussex
- Spouse: Elizabeth Ilive (m. 1801)
- Issue: 40+ illegitimate children, including: George Wyndham, 1st Baron Leconfield; General Sir Henry Wyndham
- Father: Charles Wyndham, 2nd Earl of Egremont
- Mother: Alicia Maria Carpenter
- Occupation: Agriculturist

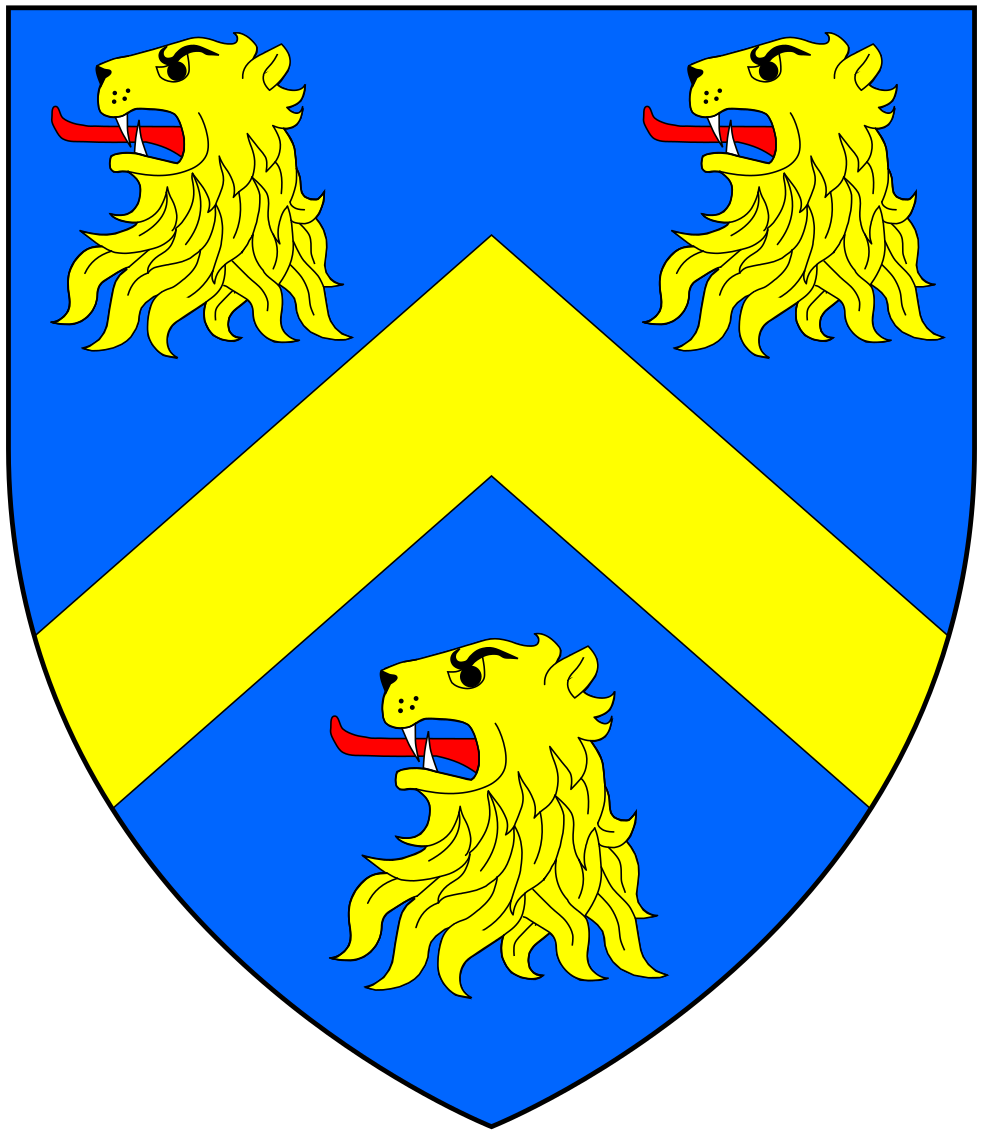
Arms of Wyndham: Azure, a chevron between three lion's heads erased or

George O'Brien Wyndham, 3rd Earl of Egremont FRS (18 December 1751 – 11 November 1837) was an English peer, landowner and art collector. He was interested in the latest scientific advances. He was an agriculturist and a friend of the agricultural writer Arthur Young, and was an enthusiastic canal builder who invested in many commercial ventures for the improvement of his estates. He played a limited role in politics.

He was a great patron of art, and the painter J. M. W. Turner lived for a while at his Sussex seat of Petworth House. Other talented artists – including John Constable, Charles Robert Leslie, George Romney and the sculptor John Flaxman – received commissions from Wyndham, who filled his house with valuable works of art. The Earl was a sponsor of the Petworth Emigration Scheme intended to relieve rural poverty caused by overpopulation. Generous and hospitable, blunt and eccentric, the earl was in his day a very prominent figure in English society. Charles Greville assessed him as "immensely rich and his munificence was equal to his wealth" and wrote that "in his time Petworth was like a great inn."

Though Wyndham had more than 40 children, the only legitimate one died in infancy. Lord Egremont was succeeded in the earldom by his nephew George Wyndham, 4th Earl of Egremont (1786–1845), but bequeathed his unentailed estates, namely the former Percy estates including Petworth House in Sussex, Leconfield Castle in Yorkshire and Egremont Castle in Cumbria, to his eldest illegitimate son Col. George Wyndham, 1st Baron Leconfield (5 June 1787 – 18 March 1869).

== Early life ==
Wyndham was born on 18 December 1751, the eldest son and heir of Charles Wyndham, 2nd Earl of Egremont (1710–1763) of Orchard Wyndham and Petworth House, by his wife Alicia Maria Carpenter, daughter of George Carpenter, 2nd Baron Carpenter of Killaghy, by his wife Elizabeth Petty.

In 1763, at the age of 12, he succeeded to his father's titles and estates at Petworth in Sussex, Egremont in Cumbria, Leconfield with further land in Wiltshire and also the large estates at Orchard Wyndham in Somerset, the family's oldest possession. He later inherited the lands of the Earl of Thomond in Ireland.

He was educated at Wandsworth and Westminster Schools. In 1774, he added O'Brien to his name upon inheriting extensive estates in Ireland from his uncle Percy Wyndham-O'Brien, 1st Earl of Thomond. He went on two grand tours to Italy in the 1770s. At the family's newly built London residence, Egremont House, he associated with fashionable Macaronis.

== Patron of the arts ==
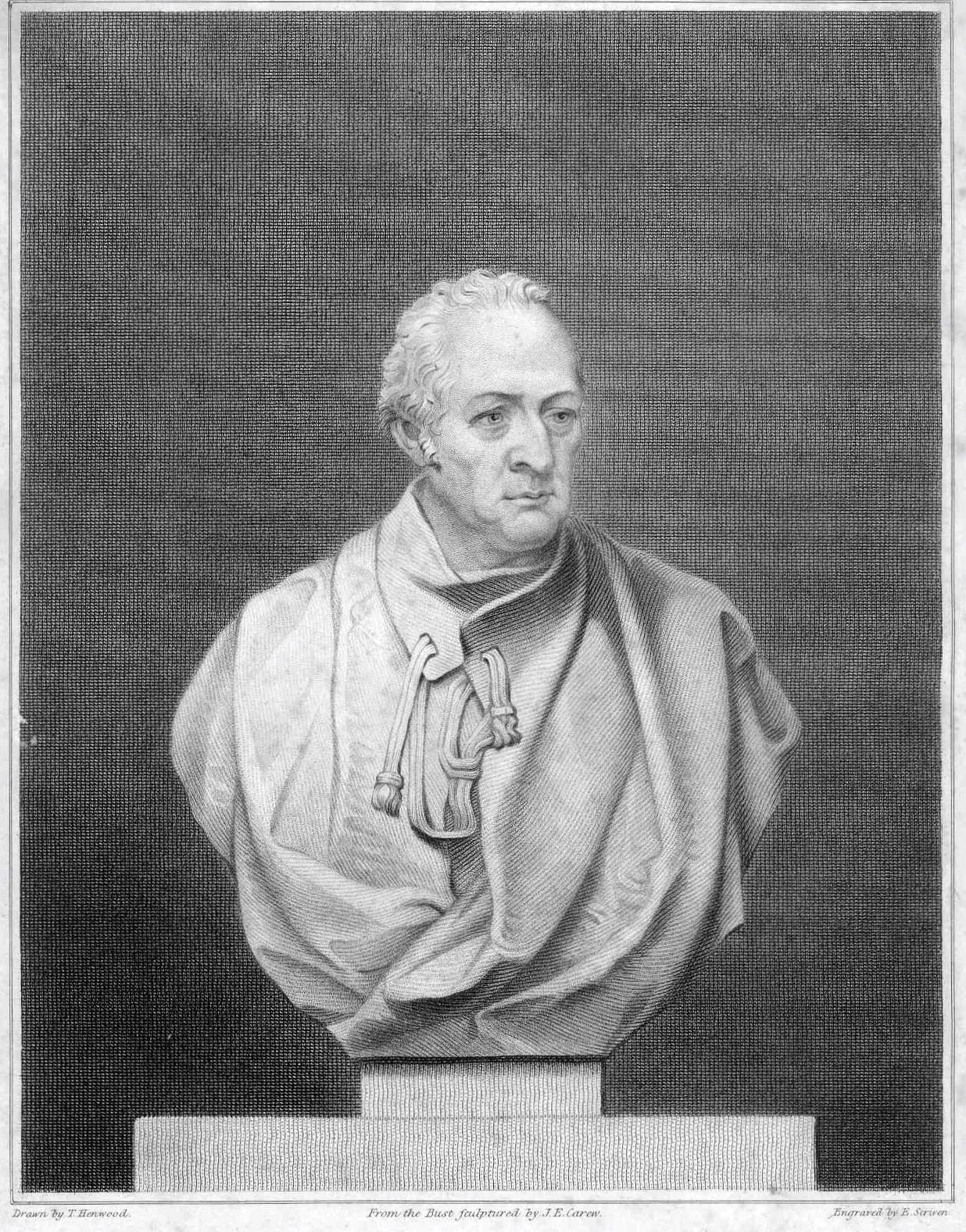
Engraving of a bust by Carew

Wyndham was a patron of painters such as Turner and Constable, and of the sculptor John Flaxman who contributed a heroic group of Michael overthrowing Satan for the North Gallery at Petworth. Turner spent much time at Petworth House and had a studio on an upper floor. He painted landscapes of Petworth, Arundel, and one of the Earl's canal projects, the Chichester Ship Canal. Like his father, the Earl also collected French furniture, as when on a visit to Paris in July 1802 during the Peace of Amiens, he bought a pair of five-light candelabra supported by bronze female caryatids, supplied by Martin-Eloy Lignereux.

== Canal builder ==
The Earl was an enthusiast for canal building, which would allow for agricultural improvement on his Petworth estates by bringing in chalk from Houghton for liming, and coal to replace scarce supplies of firewood, releasing more land for food production. The first venture was the Rother Navigation, making the River Rother navigable to Midhurst. Failing, during the time of Canal Mania, to find any reliable contractor able to undertake the construction, most of the work was done by the Earl's own estate workers. Starting from Stopham the Navigation reached Petworth in 1795 and Midhurst in 1796. A branch to Haslingbourne, south of Petworth, was then built, known as the Petworth Canal. This was originally intended to be extended north to link to the River Wey, but following unfavourable surveys, the plan was abandoned when the cost of locks needed to reach the north side of Petworth proved prohibitive.

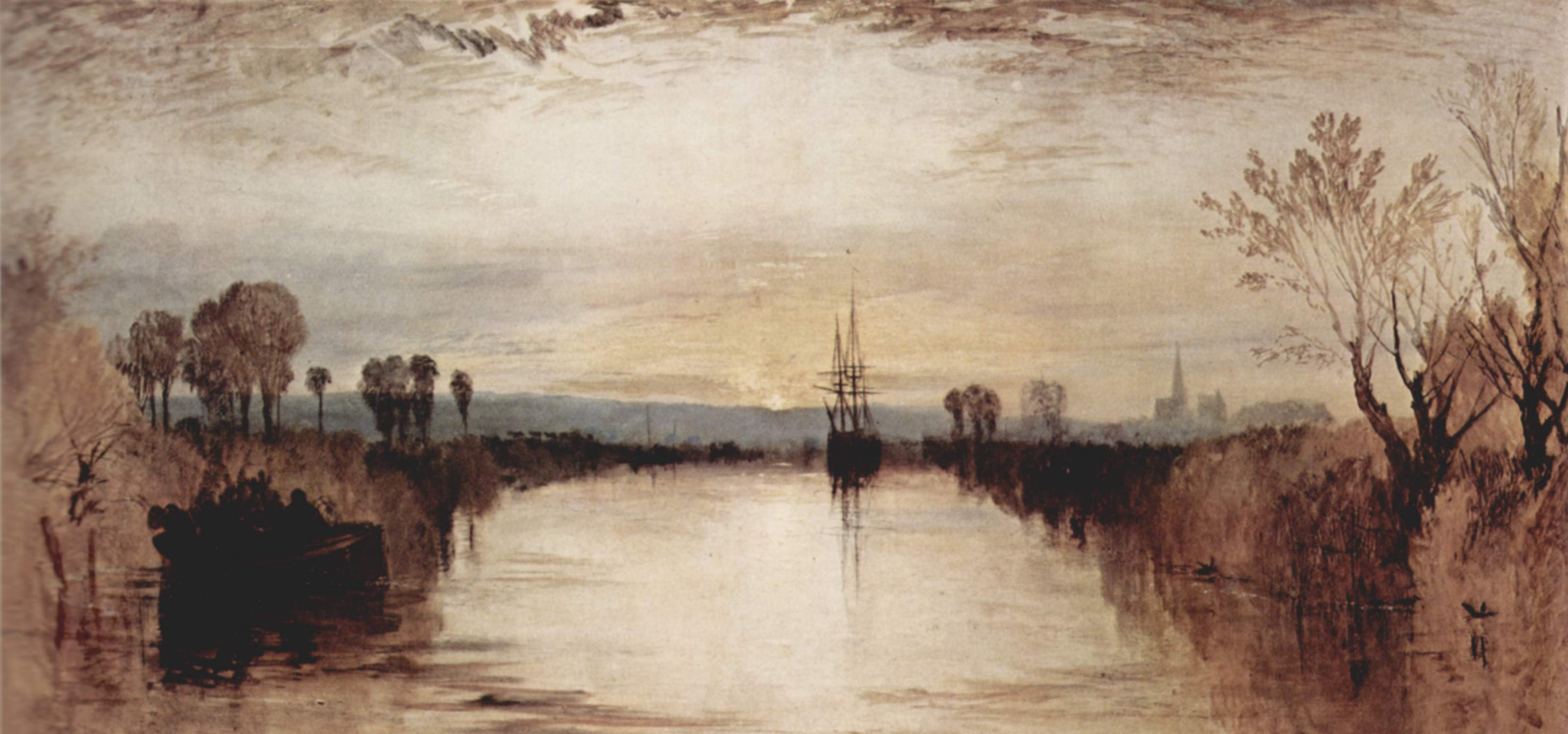
Chichester Canal circa 1828 by J.M.W. Turner

In 1796, the Earl purchased 36 per cent of the shares in the Arun Navigation Company, saving it from bankruptcy when it was burdened with the £16,000 cost of building the Coldwaltham cut and Hardham tunnel. Having abandoned plans for a canal from Petworth to Shalford and keen for the nation to have an inland waterway linking London and Portsmouth, safe from natural hazards to coastal shipping and naval attack by the French, the Earl turned his attention to linking the River Arun to the River Wey in Surrey. The Arun Canal had extended the navigable length of the River Arun to Newbridge on the road from Wisborough Green to Billingshurst and the Wey and Arun Junction Canal was completed in 1816 to connect to the Godalming Navigation. In 1823, the completion of the Portsmouth and Arundel Canal, including the Chichester Ship Canal, completed the London to Portsmouth route for barges and marked the end of the Earl's investment in canal building.

A number of vessels were named Egremont, including a barge on the Arun Navigation, a brigantine built at Littlehampton for coastal trading and wrecked on the Goodwin Sands after only two years, and later a steam tug used to tow barges across Chichester and Langstone harbours for the Portsmouth and Arundel Canal.

== Promoter of emigration ==
War with France and population growth made famine an ever-present danger in the early nineteenth century and there was an urgent need to maximise food production using any land that could be cultivated. In the 1820s, emigration, mostly to Canada, was promoted as a means of relieving rural unemployment and poverty. Thomas Sockett, Rector of Petworth and Wyndham's protégé, promoted the Petworth Emigration Scheme, which sent 1,800 people from Sussex and neighbouring counties to Upper Canada between 1832 and 1837. The Earl encouraged those living on his land to join the scheme by offering to pay the £10 per head cost of passage.

== Agriculture ==
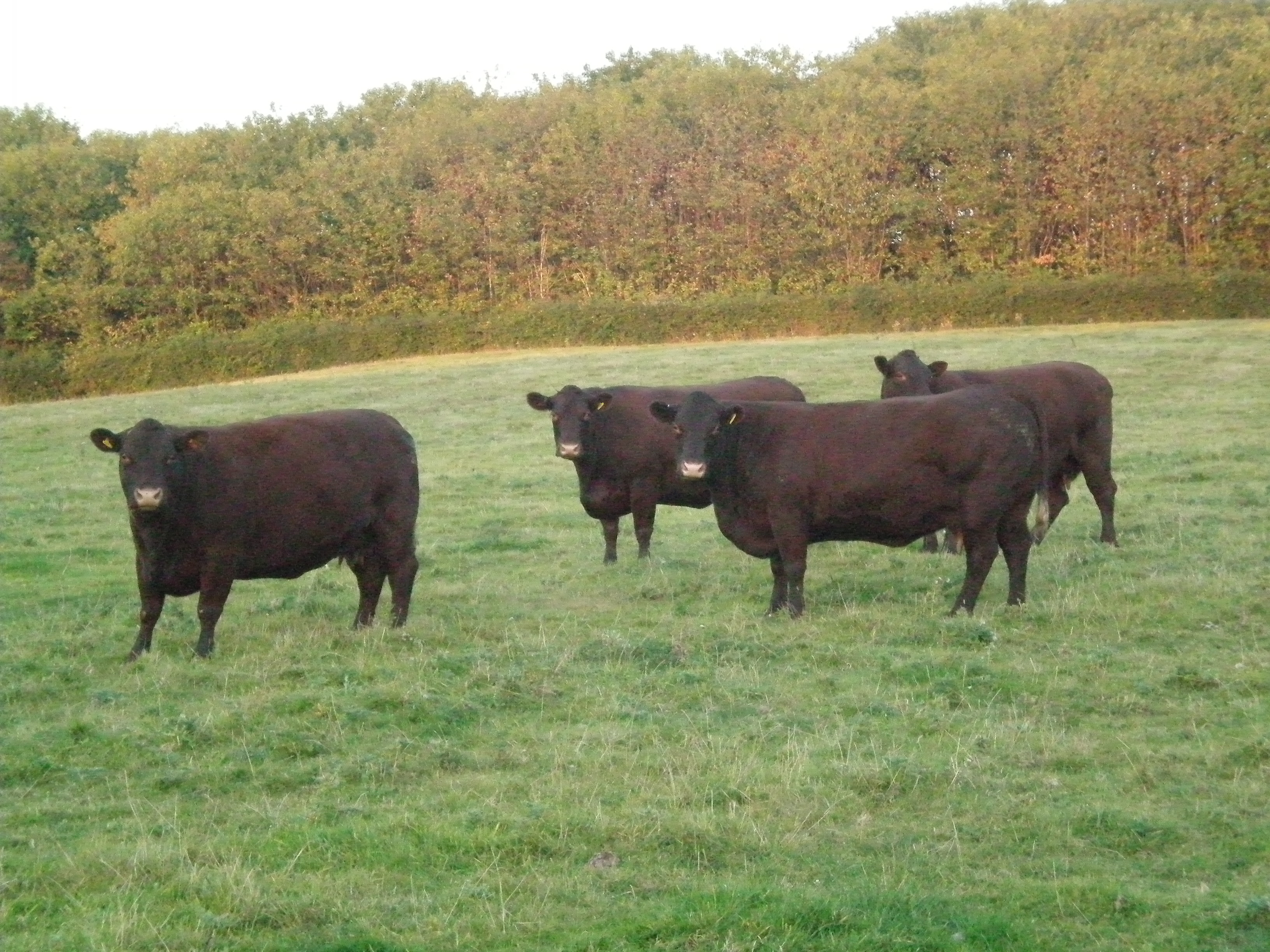
Sussex cows at Stag Park

The agriculturist Arthur Young stayed at Petworth House while conducting his surveys of English agriculture. The Earl established a pedigree herd of Sussex cattle from the local breed which was commended by Young who wrote that they "must be unquestionably ranked among the best of the kingdom". A herd descended from these animals is maintained at Stag Park at the present day. Devon and Hereford cattle were also kept, together with crossbreds. Different breeds of sheep were tried and exotic Tibetan Shaul goats, which produced fine wool for hatters.

Stag Park model farm was created in the northern part of Petworth Park on land cleared of scrub and gorse, consisting of between 700 and 800 acres divided into fields and drained. Land previously used for producing wood fuel could then be released for food production as wood had been replaced by coal delivered by the new canal system. Crop rotations including turnips, tares, wheat, barley, oats and grass were introduced. Potatoes were grown at Petworth and rhubarb as medicine. More unusually Young describes opium production at Petworth, with juices from the incised poppy heads being scraped into earthenware bowls and dried in the sun. The 1797 crop was the largest grown in England and was said to be purer than imported opium.

The 24,000-acre estates in Yorkshire at Wressle and Leconfield in the East Riding, Catton and Seamer in the North Riding, and Spofforth and Tadcaster in the West Riding were also greatly improved with £26,000 spent on drainage and fencing alone between 1797 and 1812.

As well as breeding horses and introducing improved machinery, the Earl was keen to continue using draught-oxen when they were going out of favour elsewhere. Young records that by experiment traditional wooden yokes were found to be superior to horse-style collars.

John Ellman, writing in The History, Antiquities and Topography of the County of Sussex by Thomas Walker Horsfield (1835), writes of Wyndham:

Horses—This county must not boast of their breed. The Earl of Egremont, with a spirit of liberality which pervades all his actions, gives to farmers, in the neighbourhood of Petworth, the opportunity of breeding from his valuable stud; his lordship also affords the eastern part of the county the same opportunity, by giving the use of one of his best bred horses to Mr. Brown, the venerable training groom at Lewes; his lordship also gives annual premiums to the breeders of the best colts, shewn at Egdean fair, near Petworth.

In 1800, Wyndham bought land at Houghton, Sussex, where he developed chalk pits, which in 1808 Arthur Young reported as producing 40,000 tonnes (40,000,000 kg) annually. A canal cut was dug from the River Arun to allow chalk to be moved by barge to lime kilns on higher reaches of the river system, including one at Haslingbourne, south of Petworth.

== Other enterprises ==
Paper mills were established at Duncton, south of Petworth and at Iping, west of Midhurst. Near Northchapel, a government factory was set up to produce high-quality charcoal (for making gunpowder) from alder wood in coal-heated iron cylinders.

At Spofforth in North Yorkshire, the geologist William Smith was employed to search for coal and iron ore deposits. Between 1803 and 1804, £1,000 was invested in sinking test wells, with the use of steam engines to pump out water. Six thin veins of coal were found but were insufficient to be of commercial value.

== Horse racing ==
Wyndham maintained a racing stud near Lewes and had his first winner at Lewes in 1777. Assassin won the Derby in 1782, the first of his five Derby winners and five Oaks winners. His racing silks were dark green with a black cap.

== Politics ==
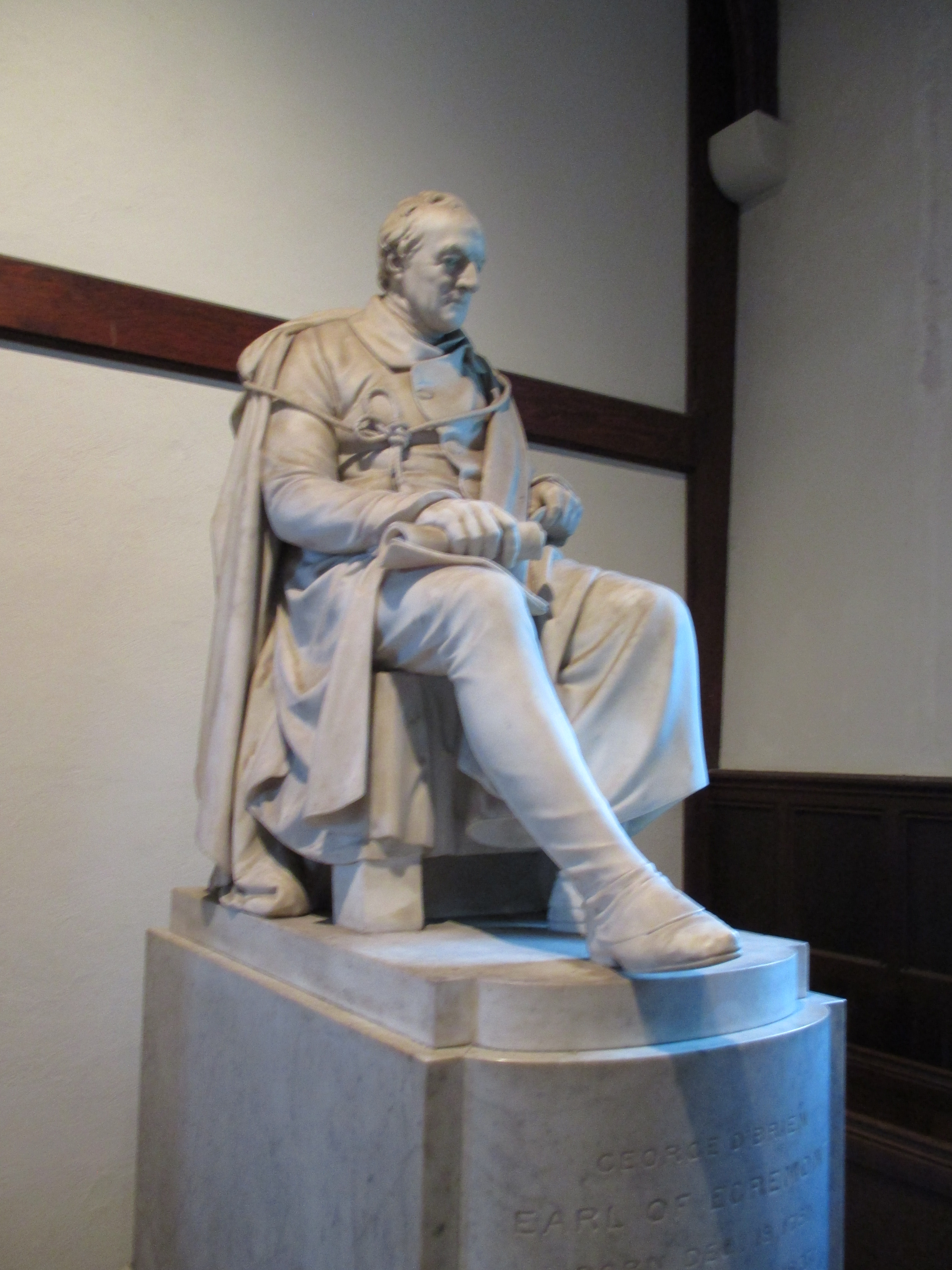
Monument by Edward Hodges Baily in St Mary's Church, Petworth

Wyndham was a member of the Whig party. In 1787, he bought the pocket borough of Midhurst and used it to return his two younger brothers, Charles and Percy, to the House of Commons. Charles only served in one parliament for Midhurst and by 1796 the seat had been sold to Robert Smith, 1st Baron Carrington. When the party split in 1792 over the French Revolution he sided with the more conservative faction which supported Prime Minister William Pitt the Younger in his condemnation of the "wicked and seditious" writings of radicals such as Thomas Paine. He opposed the Poor Law Amendment Act 1834 which introduced the harsh workhouse system. When the Sussex Poor Law Commissioner William Hawley visited Petworth House in October 1835 he was politely received but was informed that the Earl considered the Act "one of the worst measures that could have been devised".

While Egremont remained aloof from day-to-day affairs, his secretary Thomas Sockett, Rector of Petworth, was deeply involved with poor relief and emigration, and became engaged in bitter disputes with the commissioner over the provision of relief to Petworth paupers and the running of the Petworth Emigration Scheme. The national press reported the matter and Sockett, together with other witnesses from Petworth, gave evidence to a House of Commons select committee in March 1837.

== Military ==
The county Yeomanry was revived in 1794 "in case of invasion or internal commotion", reflecting aristocratic nervousness following the French revolution. Composed of landowners and tenant farmers this cavalry force was naturally commanded by the most powerful landowners. In Sussex, this took the form of the Sussex Troops of Gentlemen and Yeoman Cavalry, with the Earl himself as Colonel, as well as commanding the Petworth Troop. Volunteers provided their own horse while the government paid for maintenance and basic equipment. Wyndham himself bought extra arms, helmets, cloaks and feathers from London. Volunteers gained exemptions from taxes on horses, hair powder and from road tolls. By 1798 the Petworth Troop had fifty-two members.

== Petworth ==
Wyndham financed the building of a market house at Petworth in 1793 on the market square where bulls had previously been tied to a stake for baiting by dogs. The Earl ended this cruel practice and also the practice of "throwing at cocks", which involved throwing wooden staves at cockerels, the thrower winning a bird if it was stunned or had its legs broken. This had been done at the Midhurst road turning. The Market House or Town Hall was built of stone and adorned at the northern end with a bust of William III.

The Earl provided land in 1784 for a new House of Correction, to replace the previous gaol, which had been a squalid place consisting of two unheated rooms and unable to be enlarged to provide the work which was considered essential for the moral improvement of inmates. Delays were caused by petitioning by ratepayers against the costs they would have to bear. Thirty-two cells in two storeys were built over brick arch arcades to prevent tunnelling out, and the institution opened in 1788 near the present police station and courthouse. Prisoners were kept in strict solitary confinement, and never allowed to speak to each other; even when in chapel they were in individual high-sided box pews. Exercise in the outside yards, called "airing", was also done individually.

Town gas was introduced in 1836 when a gas works was built in Station Road, using coal brought to Coultershaw wharf by barge and later by rail to Petworth railway station. A monument which stands at the north end of East Street was given by the townspeople to show their gratitude to the Earl.

The second-hand spire which Wyndham bought from a Brighton church for St Mary's Church became crooked and was taken down in 1947. The great wall which he had built around Petworth Park is still a feature of the area. Built of sandstone masonry over two metres tall, some fourteen miles of wall surrounds the park and subdivides it into three parts, the deer park in the south, then a large area of woodland, with farmland and woods in the northern part. The stone road which runs the length of the park to emerge at the junction of the Ebernoe road with the A283 once continued northward, passing to the east of Northchapel and through Frith Wood to rejoin the A283 London road at a pair of gatehouses which still stand to the north of Northchapel village. This road provided a private bypass of the toll gate at Northchapel for the Earl's family and friends.

== Mistresses ==
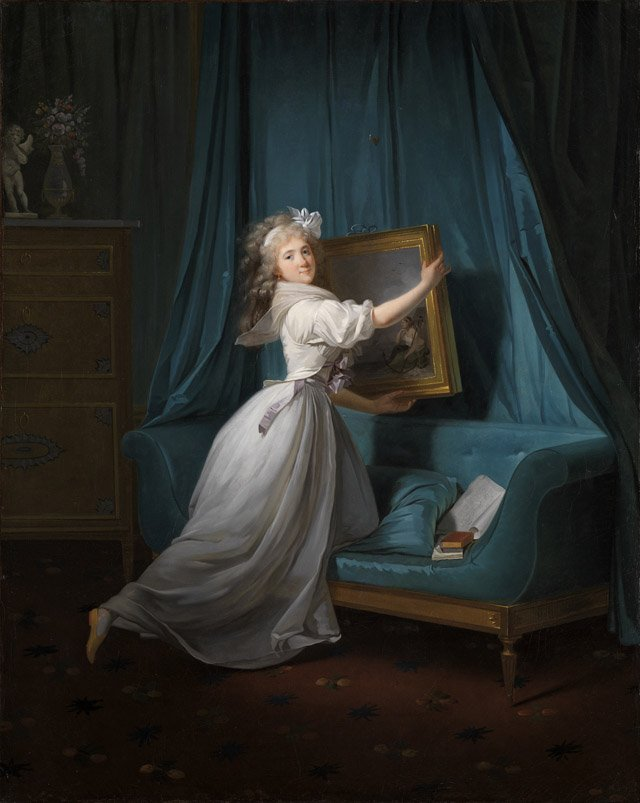
Mistress Rosalie Duthé painted by Henri-Pierre Danloux

As a young man in London, Egremont gave a gilded coach to Rosalie Duthé, sometimes called "the first officially recorded dumb blonde", a French courtesan who had moved to London during the French Revolution, with whom he was frequently seen at the opera. He was later close to Elizabeth Lamb, Viscountess Melbourne whose son William Lamb, later prime minister, was widely regarded as Wyndham's son and was said to look remarkably like him. Lamb often spent time at Petworth House as a child and continued to visit Egremont until the end of the Earl's life. Egremont called off a planned marriage to Lady Maria Walpole, a granddaughter of Prime Minister Sir Robert Walpole.

Egremont inherited the recently built London townhouse Egremont House in Piccadilly, which was known as a haunt of Macaronis. As his country seat he rented Stansted House during 1775 and 1776 while renovation work was in progress at Petworth House. He also spent much time at East Lodge, his house in Brighton, at Kemptown, on the east side of Upper Rock Gardens. He attended Brighton and Lewes races and visited the Prince Regent at the Royal Pavilion. Egremont was known for his philanthropy, and was a founding subscriber of the Royal Sussex Hospital. He also donated £1,000 towards the founding of the Sussex Scientific Institution and Mantellian Museum at Old Steine in Brighton.

Egremont maintained around 15 mistresses and fathered more than 40 illegitimate children at Petworth House. It is recorded that the peace of the household was often disturbed by disputes between the children, with their respective mothers joining in. The children, certainly of the more favoured mistresses and especially those of Elizabeth Ilive, were educated by Thomas Sockett, a protégé of the Earl whom he appointed Rector of Petworth, who also acted as the Earl's secretary. He also had four or five children by Elizabeth Fox and many others by other women.

=== Illegitimate progeny ===
Egremont had seven children by Elizabeth Ilive, who were legitimised by their later marriage but unable to inherit his titles.

- Col. George Wyndham, 1st Baron Leconfield (5 June 1787 – 18 March 1869), to whom he bequeathed his unentailed estates, namely the former Percy estates including Petworth House in Sussex, Leconfield Castle in Yorkshire and Egremont Castle in Cumbria. He adopted a differenced version of the Wyndham arms, with a bordure wavy, and was created Baron Leconfield in 1859. The loss of Petworth and the other former Seymour and Percy estates was a great blow to the 3rd Earl's nephew George Wyndham, 4th Earl of Egremont (1786–1845) who by law had inherited the earldom but without any of the lands. He was left holding the (not inconsiderable) estates of the Wyndhams of Orchard Wyndham and having considered Orchard Wyndham House insufficiently grand for his status, and in order to attempt to compensate himself for the loss of Petworth, between 1839 and 1845 he built a huge neo-classical mansion on the Wyndham manor of Silverton in Devon, called Egremont House (or Silverton Park), demolished in 1901. Petworth was donated to the National Trust in 1947 by the 1st Baron's descendant Charles Wyndham, 3rd Baron Leconfield but part of the house is still occupied today by his descendant (John) Max Wyndham, 7th Baron Leconfield, 2nd Baron Egremont (b. 1948), whose father on his ennoblement in 1963 selected the title Baron Egremont, thus partly regaining the title lost to his ancestor because of his illegitimacy.
- Frances Wyndham (1789–1848), married Sir Charles Burrell, 3rd Baronet and had issue.
- General Sir Henry Wyndham (12 May 1790 – 3 August 1860)
- Edward Wyndham Ilive (1792–1792)
- William Wyndham Ilive (1793–1794)
- Charlotte Henrietta Wyndham Ilive (1795–1870), married John James King, of Coates Castle, Sussex & afterwards of Preston Candover House, son of John King, of Aldenham House, Herts., and had issue
  - Charles Wyndham

Illegitimate children by Elizabeth (or Eliza) Fox or Crole:

- Mary Wyndham Crole (29 August 1792 – 3 December 1842), married George FitzClarence, 1st Earl of Munster, illegitimate son of King William IV, and had issue
- Capt. Charles Crole (c1795 - 20 September 1850 St James Westminster), buried Highgate Cemetery
- Elizabeth Eleanor Crole (baptised 19 June 1796 Chelsea, London, buried 16 February 1799 St James's Church, Piccadilly)
- Rev. William John Crole Wyndham (baptised 23 July 1797 Chelsea, London, died 16 November 1865 Brighton), buried Highgate Cemetery
- Maj. George Seymour Crole (born 23 August 1799, baptised 31 January 1800 St James's Church, Piccadilly, died 13 June 1863 Chatham, Kent), buried Highgate Cemetery Rumoured to be the son of George IV.
- Laura Wyndham Crole

== Marriage ==
On 16 July 1801, Wyndham married his mistress Elizabeth Ilive, already having had seven illegitimate children by her. After their eighth child, Elizabeth, died in infancy, Elizabeth Ilive left Petworth to live in London.

=== Legitimate progeny ===
- Lady Elizabeth Wyndham (1803–1803), died an infant.

== Death ==
The Earl died at Petworth House on 11 November 1837. In earlier centuries a horse fair was held at Egdean in early September. It was one of the last occasions on which Wyndham was seen in public before his death. The Earl gave a £20 prize for the best three-year-old colt or filly.

== Succession ==
As he left no legitimate progeny he was succeeded in the earldom by his nephew George Francis Wyndham, 4th Earl of Egremont, who inherited the Somerset estates, and on whose death without progeny the earldom of Egremont became extinct. Petworth and various estates in Yorkshire and Ireland passed to Colonel George Wyndham, the eldest natural son of the 3rd Earl, who in 1859 was created Baron Leconfield. Henry Wyndham inherited the family estates in Cumberland.

== Bibliography ==
- Arnold, F H (1864). Petworth: a sketch of its History and Antiquities, with notices of objects of archaeological interest in its vicinity. Petworth: A J Bryant.
- Collis, Rose (2010). The New Encyclopaedia of Brighton. (based on the original by Tim Carder) (1st ed.). Brighton: Brighton & Hove Libraries. ISBN 978-0-9564664-0-2.
- Jerrome, Peter (2006). Petworth. From 1660 to the present day. Petworth: The Window Press.(Limited edition)
- Haines, Sheila; Lawson, Leigh (2007). Poor Cottages & Proud Palaces. The Hastings Press. ISBN 978-1-904109-16-7.
- Vine, P A L (2000). Images of England The Arun Navigation. Stroud: Tempus Publishing Limited. ISBN 0-7524-2103-4.
- Vine, P A L. London's Lost Route to Midhurst The Earl of Egremont's Navigation.
- Royall, Michael (1999). The Petworth House of Correction. ISBN 0-9534846-0-2.
- Young, Arthur (1813). General View of the Agriculture of the County of Sussex.
- Wright, Glenn (1813). Moving Here, Staying Here: The Canadian Immigrant Experience. Library and Archives Canada – "Right of Passage: Debates".
- L. Barlow & R.J. Smith, The Uniforms of the British Yeomanry Force 1794–1914, 1: The Sussex Yeomanry Cavalry, London: Robert Ogilby Trust/Tunbridge Wells: Midas Books, ca 1979, ISBN 0-85936-183-7.
- Col H.C.B. Rogers, The Mounted Troops of the British Army 1066–1945, London: Seeley Service, 1959.

Honorary titles
| Preceded by The 4th Duke of Richmond | Lord Lieutenant of Sussex; 1819–1835 | Succeeded by The 5th Duke of Richmond |
| Preceded by The 4th Duke of Richmond | Vice-Admiral of Sussex; 1820–1831 | Succeeded by The 5th Duke of Richmond |
Peerage of Great Britain
| Preceded by Charles Wyndham | Earl of Egremont; 1763–1837 | Succeeded by George Wyndham |
