= Wyndham House, London =

Building in Chelsea, London

Coordinates: 51°29′30.7″N 0°09′25.6″W

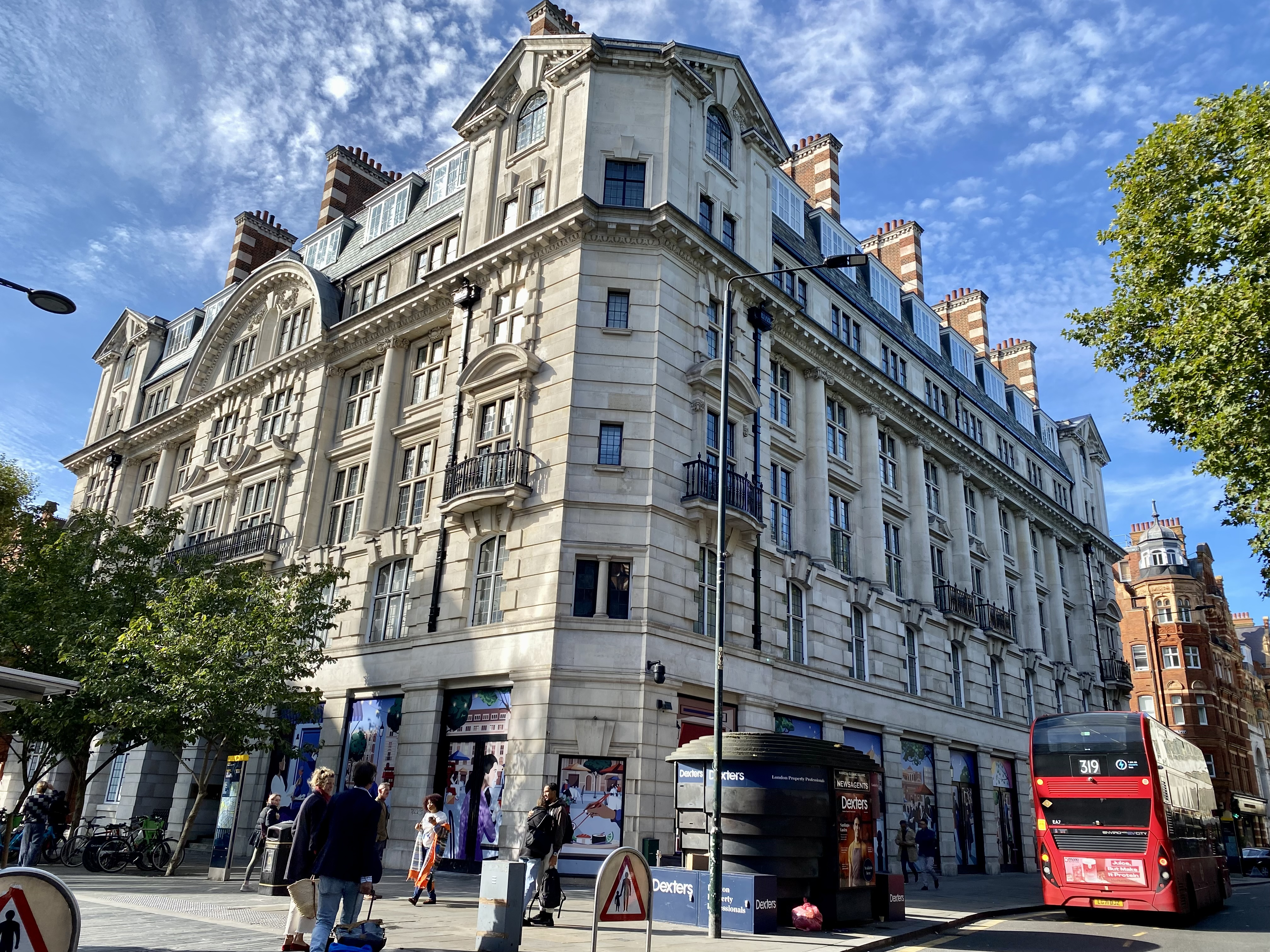
Wyndham House

Wyndham House is a large stone building on the southeast corner of Sloane Square, Chelsea, London. Wyndham House was formerly the London residence of the prominent Wyndham family. It was owned by the Barons Leconfield. It has since been converted to upscale flats for sale.
