= Max Egremont =

British biographer and novelist

The Right Honourable The Lord Egremont FRSL DL
- Arms of Wyndham, Baron Leconfield and Egremont: Azure, a chevron between three lion's heads erased or a bordure wavy of the last. These are the arms of Wyndham of Orchard Wyndham, differenced by a bordure wavy, for the illegitimacy of the 1st Baron Leconfield.

Member of the House of Lords
- Lord Temporal
- In office 6 June 1972 – 11 November 1999 as a hereditary peer
- Preceded by: The 1st Baron Egremont
- Succeeded by: Seat abolished (Note: Pursuant to the House of Lords Act 1999.)

Personal details
- Born: John Max Henry Scawen Wyndham; 21 April 1948 (age 78)
- Occupation: Biographer, novelist
- Other titles: 7th Baron Leconfield

John Max Henry Scawen Wyndham, 2nd Baron Egremont, 7th Baron Leconfield (born 21 April 1948), commonly known as Max Egremont, is a British biographer and novelist.

== Early life and education ==
Egremont is the eldest son of John Wyndham, 1st Baron Egremont, and Pamela Wyndham-Quin. He is a direct descendant of Sir John Wyndham. His father was raised to the peerage as Baron Egremont in 1963, the same year as his grandfather succeeded his older brother in the Leconfield barony. They took their seats in the House of Lords on the same day.

Egremont grew up at Petworth House. He was educated first at Heatherdown School near Ascot, then at Eton College and at Christ Church, Oxford, where he read modern history. He succeeded to both baronies upon the death of his father in 1972.

== Career ==
Egremont has worked for the American publishing firm Crowell Collier Macmillan and on the staff of U.S. Senator Hugh Scott in Washington, D.C.

== Writing ==
Egremont's first book, The Cousins: The Friendship, Opinions and Activities of Wilfrid Scawen Blunt and George Wyndham, was published in 1977 and won the Yorkshire Post Prize for the best first book of that year. His next work was Balfour: A Life of Arthur James Balfour, published in 1980.

He then wrote four novels, The Ladies' Man (1983), Dear Shadows (1986), Painted Lives (1989) and Second Spring (1993). His biography of Major General Sir Edward Spears, Under Two Flags, was published in 1997 and was short-listed for the Westminster Medal for Military History. He was appointed to be the official biographer of Siegfried Sassoon by Sassoon's son George. Egremont's Siegfried Sassoon came out in 2005 and was short-listed for the James Tait Black Memorial Prize.

He gave many lectures of the subject of Sassoon, including to the Manchester Literary & Philosophical Society THE WILDE LECTURE, where notes of his lecture may be viewed.

In 2011 he published Forgotten Land, Journeys Among the Ghosts of East Prussia. In 2014, he published Some Desperate Glory, the First World War the Poets Knew. In 2017 Egremont was joint author with Frances Carey of Käthe Kollwitz, Portrait of the Artist, the catalogue that accompanied a travelling exhibition of Kollwitz's work. He was elected a Fellow of the Royal Society of Literature in 2001. Egremont's short book The Connel Guide to World War 1 was published in 2017.

== Marriage and children ==
Egremont married Caroline Nelson, a garden designer, granddaughter of Almeric Paget, 1st Baron Queenborough, in 1978. They have four children, three daughters and a son:

- Hon. Jessica Mary Wyndham (born 27 April 1979)
- Hon. Constance Rose Wyndham (born 20 December 1980)
- Hon. George Ronan Valentine Wyndham (born 31 July 1983), heir apparent to the baronies.
- Hon. Mary Christian Wyndham (born 4 October 1985)

He lives at the family seat of Petworth House in Sussex, which his family gave to the National Trust in 1947.

== Other interests ==
He was a trustee of the Wallace Collection from 1988 to 2000, of the British Museum from 1990 to 2000, and a member of the Royal Commission on Historical Manuscripts from 1989 to 2001. He has been chairman of the Friends of the National Libraries since 1985 and of the National Manuscripts Conservation Trust since 1995. He is President of the Sussex Heritage Trust and of the Sussex branch of the Council for the Protection of Rural England. Since 1998, he has been President of the Roxburghe Club.

== Books ==
- The Cousins: The Friendship, Opinions and Activities of Wilfrid Scawen Blunt and George Wyndham (William Collins, 1977) ISBN 9780002161343
- Balfour: A Life of Arthur James Balfour (William Collins, 1980)
  - (Phoenix Giants, 1998) ISBN 9780753801468
- The Ladies' Man (Secker & Warburg, 1983) ISBN 9780436141706
- Dear Shadows (Secker & Warburg, 1986) ISBN 9780436141607
- Painted Lives (Hamish Hamilton, 1989) ISBN 9780241127063
- Second Spring (Hamish Hamilton, 1993) ISBN 9780241133897
- Under Two Flags: The Life of Major-General Sir Edward Spears (Weidenfeld & Nicolson, 1997) ISBN 9780297813477
- Siegfried Sassoon: A Poet and His Library (Grolier Club, 2002)
- Siegfried Sassoon. A Biography (Picador, 2005)
  - (US edition) Siegfried Sassoon: A Life (Farrar, Straus and Giroux, 2005) ISBN 9780374263751
- Forgotten Land: Journeys Among the Ghosts of East Prussia (Picador, 2011) ISBN 9780330456609
- Some Desperate Glory: The First World War the Poets Knew (Picador, 2014) ISBN 9780374280321
- Käthe Kollwitz, with Frances Carey (British Museum, 2018)
- All You Need to Know About World War 1 (Connel, 2018)
- The Glass Wall: Lives on the Baltic Frontier (Farrar, Straus and Giroux, 2022) ISBN 9780374163457

=== Contributions ===
- (introduction) Ivan Turgenev, A Sportsman's Notebook (Everyman's Library, 1992) ISBN 9780679410454
- (introduction) Anthony Trollope, The Claverings (London: The Folio Society, 1994)
- (introduction) Anthony Trollope, The Duke's Children (Everyman's Library, 2017) ISBN 9781101907818

== Notes ==
Peerage of the United Kingdom
Preceded by John Wyndham	Baron Egremont; 1972–present Member of the House of Lords (1972–1999)	Incumbent; Heir apparent: Hon. George Wyndham
Preceded by John Wyndham	Baron Leconfield; 1972–present	Incumbent; Heir apparent: Hon. George Wyndham
