= George Wyndham, 1st Baron Leconfield =

British baron (1787–1869)

The Right Honourable The Lord Leconfield
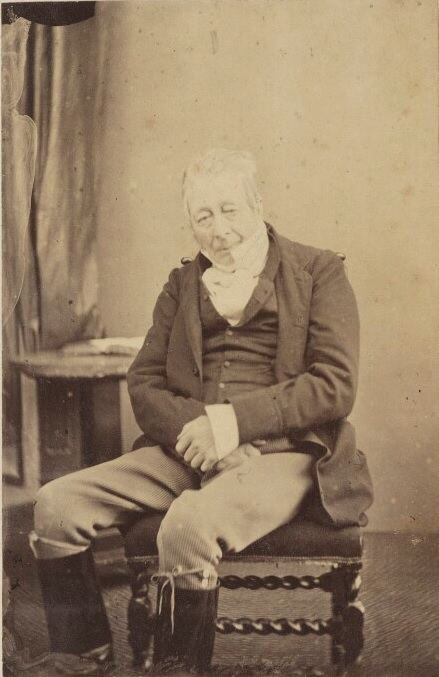
- Leconfield by unknown author circa 1860s

Member of the House of Lords
- Lord Temporal
- In office 11 April 1859 – 18 March 1869
- Preceded by: Peerage created
- Succeeded by: The 2nd Baron Leconfield

Personal details
- Born: George Wyndham; 5 June 1787
- Died: 18 March 1869 (aged 81)

George Wyndham, 1st Baron Leconfield (5 June 1787 – 18 March 1869), was a British soldier and hereditary peer.

== Early life ==
A direct descendant of Sir John Wyndham, he was born in 1787, the eldest natural son of George Wyndham, 3rd Earl of Egremont, and Elizabeth Ilive. His parents were married in 1801 but had no sons after their marriage.

== Military career ==
Wyndham entered the Royal Navy in 1799 as a midshipman on HMS Amelia. In 1802 he transferred to the Army as a cornet in the 5th Dragoon Guards, promoted in 1803 to lieutenant in the 3rd Dragoon Guards. In 1805 he was a captain in the 72nd Highlanders and ADC to Sir Eyre Coote who was Lieutenant Governor of Jamaica. In 1807 he was DAAG to Earl Cathcart at the Bombardment of Copenhagen; in 1809, as captain in the 1st Foot Guards, he took part in the Walcheren Expedition; in 1811 he was a major in the 78th Regiment and the 12th Light Dragoons; and in 1812 he was lieutenant-colonel commanding the 20th Light Dragoons at the siege of Ciudad Rodrigo.

== Peerage ==
Arms of Wyndham, Baron Leconfield and Egremont: Azure, a chevron between three lion's heads erased or a bordure wavy of the last. These are the arms of Wyndham of Orchard Wyndham, differenced by a bordure wavy, for the illegitimacy of the 1st Baron Leconfield.

When he died in 1837 the 3rd Earl of Egremont bequeathed all his unentailed property to George Wyndham, who therefore became the heir to the substantial Egremont estates, including Petworth House in Sussex. In 1859 he was raised to the peerage as Baron Leconfield, of Leconfield in the East Riding of the County of York.

During the Great Irish Famine, Wyndham was often in residence in his County Clare estate near Ennis where he assisted tenants who wanted to emigrate to Canada. This was a continuation of his father's improving policies in Sussex. In late 1849 and early 1850, a series of seven anonymous essays and illustrations concerning the famine appeared in The Illustrated London News under the title "Condition of Ireland: Illustrations of the New Poor Law." Here the narrator (likely the journalist and philanthropist Sidney Godolphin Osborne) writes of Col. Wyndham that "Colonel Windham . . . is not tired of his fellow-creatures, and does not seek to exterminate them. Not a roofless house did I see here." His property was a "little oasis of humanity in the desert of misery."

== Marriage and children ==
Wyndham married Mary Fanny Blunt, daughter of Reverend William Blunt, in 1815. They had nine children:

- Mary Wyndham (3 March 1816 – 24 May 1823), died young
- George William Wyndham (27 February 1817 – 2 July 1837)
- Hon. Fanny Charlotte Wyndham (20 September 1820 – 27 January 1893)
- Hon. Helen Caroline Elizabeth Wyndham (11 May 1823 – 19 March 1852), married Alfred Montgomery, brother of Sir Henry Conyngham Montgomery, 2nd Baronet; their daughter, Sibyl, married John Douglas, 9th Marquess of Queensberry
- Hon. Blanche Julia Wyndham (21 November 1826 – 31 January 1918), married Richard Bourke, 6th Earl of Mayo
- Hon. Caroline Sophia Wyndham (10 September 1829 – 19 March 1852), married Col. Sir Nigel Kingscote
- Henry Wyndham, 2nd Baron Leconfield (1830–1901)
- Hon. Percy Scawen Wyndham (1835–1911)
- Hon. Constance Elizabeth Wyndham (21 November 1836 – 21 January 1920), married William Mure

== Death ==
Lord Leconfield died in March 1869 at the age of 81 and was succeeded in the barony by his eldest surviving son Henry.

His third son, Percy, was the father of the politician and man of letters George Wyndham. His daughter, Caroline, married Colonel Sir Nigel Kingscote on 13 March 1851 at Petworth, Sussex. She died giving birth and is buried with her still-born child in the family vault at Bartons Lane Cemetery, Petworth, West Sussex.

== See also ==
- Earl of Egremont

Peerage of the United Kingdom
New creation	Baron Leconfield; 1859–1869; Member of the House of Lords (1859–1869)	Succeeded by Henry Wyndham
