= Cadency =

System in heraldry to distinguish family members

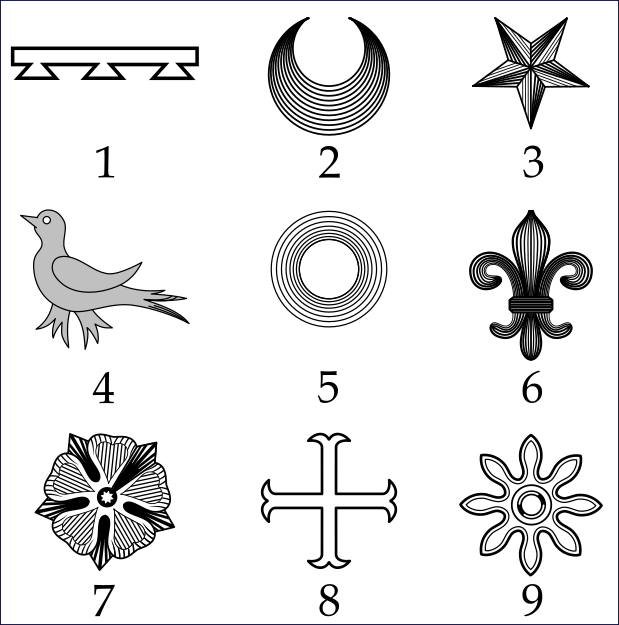
Charges used as marks of cadency in English heraldry: 1: label of three points; 2: crescent; 3: mullet; 4: martlet; 5: annulet; 6: fleur-de-lys; 7: rose; 8: cross moline; 9: octofoil

In heraldry, cadency is any systematic way to distinguish arms displayed by descendants of the holder of a coat of arms when those family members have not been granted arms in their own right. Cadency is necessary in heraldic systems in which a given design may be owned by only one person at any time, generally the head of the senior line of a particular family.

As an armiger's arms may be used 'by courtesy', either by children or spouses, while they are still living, some form of differencing may be required so as not to confuse them with the original undifferenced or "plain coat" arms. Historically, arms were only heritable by sons, and therefore cadency marks had no relevance to daughters; in the modern era, Canadian and Irish heraldry include daughters in cadency.

These differences are formed by adding to the arms small and inconspicuous marks called brisures, similar to charges but smaller. They are typically placed on the fess point (the centre of the field), or in chief (the upper part of the field) in the case of the label. Brisures are generally exempt from the rule of tincture. One of the best examples of usage from the medieval period is shown on the seven Beauchamp cadets in the stained-glass windows of St Mary's Church, Warwick.

== Background ==
Historically, it was recognised that there was a need to difference the arms of the head of the family from those of cadets. This need was recognised in Europe during the 14th century; various means to accomplish this were used.

In the modern era, differencing arms is generally rarely done in continental Europe. It is only in Scotland where the need to difference cadets is enforced.

== Ways of differencing ==
In heraldry's early period, uniqueness of arms was obtained by a wide variety of ways, including:

- changing tincture
- adding a label or bordure
- adding, removing, or replacing an ordinary.
- varying the lines of partition of an ordinary
- the use of brisures or marks of difference

See Armorial of Capetians and Armorial of Plantagenet for an illustration of the variety.

== Systems derived from English and Scottish usage ==
Systematic cadency schemes later developed in England and Scotland, but while in England they are voluntary (and not always observed), in Scotland they are enforced through the statutorily required process of matriculation in the Public Register.

=== England ===
The English system of cadency allows nuclear family members to personally use the arms of the head of that family 'by courtesy'. This involves the addition of a brisure, or mark of difference to the original coat of arms. The brisure identifies the bearer's family relationship to the actual bearer of the arms. Although there is some debate over how strictly the system should be followed, the accepted system is shown below:

	First son	Second son	Third son	Fourth son	Fifth son	Sixth son	Seventh son	Eighth son	Ninth son
family member									
family member	label of three points	crescent	mullet	martlet	annulet	fleur-de-lys	rose	cross moline	double quatrefoil (Note: also known as an octofoil)

Arms of the Earl of Strafford from the Byng family (on the left) and of the Viscount Byng of Vimy (on the right), incorporating a crescent, the mark of cadency for the second son.
The arms of the first Earl Russell, who was the third son of the sixth Duke of Bedford, were given a mullet argent over the central escallop to differentiate them from his paternal arms. The arms of the first Baron Ampthill, who was third son of the ninth Duke of Bedford, were also marked with a mullet for difference, but in a different tincture.
Arms of the Viscount Cobham from the Lyttelton family (on the left) and of the Viscount Chandos (on the right), incorporating a cross moline, the mark of cadency for the eighth son.
Arms of Edward Howard-Gibbon and George Wyndham, 1st Baron Leconfield, incorporating a bordure wavy, the mark of an illegitimate child.

Daughters have no special brisures, and normally use their father's arms on a lozenge, which includes any marks of cadency their father may use. This is because English heraldry has no requirement that women's arms be unique. Upon marriage, they impale their father's arms to the sinister with those of their husband to the dexter. However, if the woman happens to be a heraldic heiress, her father's arms are borne on an inescutcheon on her husband's arms.

In England, arms are generally the property of their owner from birth, subject to the use of the appropriate mark of cadency. Therefore, it is not necessary to wait for the death of the previous generation before arms are inherited.

Arms of the Baron O'Neill (on the left) and of the Baron Rathcavan (on the right), incorporating a mullet, the mark of cadency for the third son.

The eldest son of an eldest son uses a label of five points. Other grandchildren combine the brisure of their father with the relevant brisure of their own. This could lead to confusion, as both an uncle and nephew could have the same cadency mark. In a short number of generations, the accumulation of cadency marks—to show, for example, the fifth son of a third son of a second son—could lead to added complexity. In practice, cadency marks are not much used in England, and even when they are, it is rare to see more than one or two on a coat of arms.

At times, arms with a cadency mark may be used on a hereditary basis. For instance, the arms of the Earls Russell are those of the Duke of Bedford differenced by a mullet, as the 1st Earl was the third son of the 6th Duke.

Although most heraldic texts follow on the English system of cadency set out above, most heraldic examples (whether on old bookplates, church monuments, silver and the like) ignore cadency marks altogether. Oswald Barron noted:

Now and again we see a second son obeying the book-rules and putting a crescent in his shield or a third son displaying a molet, but long before our own times the practice was disregarded, and the most remote kinsman of a gentle house displayed the "whole coat" of the head of his family.

Nor have cadency marks usually been insisted upon by the College of Arms, the heraldic authority for England, Wales, and Northern Ireland. For example, a statement on their website refers to the optional nature of cadency marks:

The arms of a man pass equally to all his legitimate children, irrespective of their order of birth. Cadency marks may be used to identify the arms of brothers, in a system said to have been invented by John Writhe, Garter, in about 1500. Small symbols are painted on the shield, usually in a contrasting tincture at the top.

In correspondence published in the Heraldry Society's newsletter, Garter King of Arms Peter Gwynn-Jones firmly rejected a suggestion that cadency marks should be strictly enforced. He said:

I have never favoured the system of cadency unless there is a need to mark out distinct branches of a particular family. To use cadency marks for each and every generation is something of a nonsense as it results in a pile of indecipherable marks set one above the other. I therefore adhere to the view that they should be used sparingly.

In a second letter published at the same time, he wrote:

Unfortunately, compulsion is not the way ahead for twenty-first century heraldry. However, official recognition and certification of any Armorial Bearings can only be effected when the person in whose favour the Arms are being recognized or certified appears in the appropriate book of record at the College of Arms. I believe it right in England and Wales for a branch to use cadency marks sparingly and only if they wish to do so.

==== Adopted children ====
Clarenceux King of Arms John Brooke-Little wrote that "adopted children may be granted the arms of their adoptive father, but a Royal License must be sought, and the arms, when granted, are differences by the addition of two links of a chain interlaced, either fesswise or palewise..."

=== Scotland ===
The system is very different in Scotland, where every male user of a coat of arms may only use arms recorded, or "matriculated", in the Public Register with a personal variation, appropriate to that person's position in their family, approved by the heraldic authority for Scotland, the Lord Lyon. This means that in Scotland no two men can ever simultaneously bear the same arms, even by accident, if they have submitted their position to the Scottish heraldic authorities (which not all do in practice, in Scotland as in England); if they have not done so, the matter falls under statute law and may result in proceedings in the Lyon Court, which is part of the Scots criminal justice system. To this extent, the law of arms is stricter in Scotland than in England where the only legal action possible is a civil action in the Court of Chivalry, which sits extremely rarely and is not an integrated part of the English justice system.

Scotland, like England, uses the label of three points for the eldest son (or female heir presumptive) and a label of five points for the eldest son of the eldest son, and allows the label to be removed as the bearer of the plain coat dies and the eldest son succeeds.

Differencing system in Scottish heraldry

For cadets other than immediate heirs, Scottish cadency uses a complex and versatile system, applying different kinds of changes in each generation. First, a bordure is added in a different tincture for each brother. In subsequent generations the bordure may be divided in two tinctures; the edge of the bordure, or of an ordinary in the base coat, may be changed from straight to indented, engrailed or invected; charges may be added. These variations allow the family tree to be expressed clearly and unambiguously. The system outlined here is a very rough version that gives a flavour of the real thing.

In the Scots heraldic system (which has little to do with the clan system), only one bearer of any given surname may bear plain arms. Other armigerous persons with the same surname usually have arms derived from the same plain coat; though if actual kinship cannot be established, they must be differenced in a way other than the cadency system mentioned above.

=== Canada ===
Canadian cadency generally follows the English system. However, since in Canadian heraldry a coat of arms must be unique regardless of the bearer's sex, Canada has developed a series of brisures for daughters unique to Canada:

- for the first daughter, a heart;
- for the second daughter, an ermine spot;
- for the third daughter, a snowflake;
- for the fourth daughter, a fir twig;
- for the fifth daughter, a chess rook
- for the sixth daughter, an escallop (scallop shell);
- for the seventh daughter, a harp;
- for the eighth daughter, a buckle;
- for the ninth daughter, a clarion.

The actual practice in Canada is far from the rigidity suggested by the list of differences above – and is best seen in action in the Canadian Public Register – see for example the coats of various Armstrongs, Ravignats and Bradfords.

=== South Africa ===
Personal arms registered at the Bureau of Heraldry may be differenced upon matriculation (which is voluntary). Current policy is that younger children's arms must be differenced if they are matriculated. Methods used include the English and Scottish systems, the substitution of different charges, the changing of lines, and the changing of tinctures and or adding a border to the shield.

=== Ireland ===
The brisures used in the arms granted by the Chief Herald of the Republic of Ireland are identical to the brisures used by the system used in England, Wales and Northern Ireland, but unlike the English system, which only uses these brisures for the sons of an armiger in order of birth, the Irish system applies them to all the children of the armiger, irrespective of sex, and, as illegitimacy has no place in Irish heraldry, these marks are assigned to (recognised) children born outside of marriage as well as inside.

=== British royal family ===
Arms of the King

Arms of the King (in Scotland)

Arms of the Prince of Wales

Arms of the Duke of Rothesay (in Scotland)

Arms of the Duke of Sussex

Arms of Andrew Mountbatten-Windsor

Arms of Princess Beatrice

Arms of Princess Eugenie

Arms of the Duke of Edinburgh

Arms of the Princess Royal

Arms of the Duke of Gloucester

Arms of the Duke of Kent

Arms of Prince Michael

Arms of Princess Alexandra

There are no actual "rules" for members of the royal family, because their arms are theoretically decided ad hoc by the monarch. In practice, however, a number of traditions are practically invariably followed. At birth, members of the royal family have no arms. At some point during their lives, generally at the age of eighteen, they may be granted arms of their own. These will always be the "arms of dominion" of the monarch with a label argent for difference; the label may have three or five points. Since this is in theory a new grant, the label is applied not only to the shield but also to the crest and the supporters to ensure uniqueness. Though de facto in English heraldry the crest is uncharged (although it is supposed to be in theory), as it would accumulate more and more cadency marks with each generation, the marks eventually becoming indistinguishable, the crests of the royal family are always shown as charged.

Each Prince of Wales uses a plain white label and (since 1911) an inescutcheon of the ancient arms of the Principality of Wales. Traditionally, the other members of the family have used a stock series of symbols (cross of Saint George, heart, anchor, fleur-de-lys, etc.) on the points of the label to ensure that their arms differ. The label of the Duke of Sussex has three scallop shells taken from the arms of his mother, Diana, Princess of Wales; this is sometimes called an innovation but in fact the use of maternal charges for difference is a very old practice, illustrated in the "border of France" (azure semé-de-lys or) borne by John of Eltham, Earl of Cornwall (1316–36), younger son of Edward II of England and Isabella of France.

It is often said that labels argent are a peculiarly royal symbol, and that eldest sons outside the royal family should use labels of a different colour, usually gules.

== Continental usages ==
=== France ===
During the Middle Ages, marks of cadency were used extensively by armigers in France. By the eighteenth century, such marks were no longer used by the members of armigerous families, but were still used extensively by the members of the French royal family.

The French Revolution of 1789 had a profound impact on heraldry, and heraldry was abolished in 1790, to be restored in 1808 by Napoleon I. However, Napoleon's heraldic system did not use marks of cadency either; the decree of 3 March 1810 (art. 11) states: "The name, arms and livery shall pass from the father to all sons" although the distinctive marks of Napoleonic titles could pass only to the sons who inherited them.

No subsequent regime in France ever promulgated any legislation regarding marks of difference in heraldry, so they remain unused (except in the heraldry of sovereign houses, such as the former royal family, as can be seen below, or the House of Lorraine).

==== The former royal house ====
French royal arms before 1376; Azure semy-de-lys Or	French royal arms after King Charles V simplified it in 1376; Azure, three fleurs-de-lys Or	Arms of the Dauphin of France

Examples of cadency:

==== Past usage ====
Arms of Philip Hurepel, Count of Clermont	Arms of Robert I, Count of Artois	Arms of Alphonse, Count of Poitiers	Original arms of Charles, before becoming Count of Anjou and Maine
Arms of Charles, Count of Anjou and Maine	Arms of John Tristan, Count of Valois	Arms of Pierre, Count of Alençon	Arms of Robert, Count of Clermont
Arms of Charles, Count of Anjou and Maine	Arms of Louis, Count of Evreux	Arms of Philip, Count of Poitiers	Arms of Charles, Count of La Marche

The sons of Louis VIII and Blanche of Castile used golden castles on a red background (derived from the arms of Castile) as charges to difference their arms: for Robert, a label; for Alphonse, a semy of castles; for Charles, a bordure. This initial system of differencing was dropped in favor of a longer-lasting simpler system. Charles, the youngest son of Louis VIII, changed his arms in favor of the arms of France with a plain label gules.

The simpler system primarily used four marks of difference: the label, the bordure, the bend, and the bordure engrailed. The tinctures used were gules; a compony of argent and gules; and argent. They occasionally came up with more unusual forms, such as a bordure-label gules and a bordure gules charged with eight plates.

Arms granted to Philip the Bold (Duke of Touraine)	Arms of Philip the Bold as Duke of Burgundy	Arms granted to Charles, Duke of Berry, brother of Louis XI	Arms of Charles as Duke of Normandy	Arms of Charles as Duke of Guyenne

Initially, the arms were attributed to the cadet. Thus, even when Philip the Bold exchanged his appanage of Touraine in favor of Burgundy, he retained the arms he had received as Duke of Touraine, but quartered it with the arms of Burgundy. Another example is Charles, Duke of Berry, younger brother of Louis XI.

However, by the seventeenth century, arms became associated with titles. The bordure gules was associated with Anjou, and the label argent with Orléans. Thus, when a cadet exchanged his appanage, his arms changed.

=== Germany ===
German noble houses did not use cadency marks as systematically as their European peers. The sons of noblemen often bore their father's arms, and generally there was no obligation or expectation that they be differenced.

The most common means of differencing was the use of different heraldic crests to mark apart otherwise identical achievements borne by different branches of a family. Other, less frequent forms include counter-changing or the replacement of individual tinctures, or the addition of ordinaries. Bordures and labels were used occasionally, though not doctrinally. Perhaps the most prominent German family to adopt a system of bordures was the House of Hohenzollern.

As a result of the Holy Roman Empire's heavy fragmentation, which form saw more prominent use and when was also influenced by general trends and geographic proximity; for example, the heraldic tradition of the Low Countries and the Rhineland saw a great deal of influence by its French neighbor.

=== Italy ===
==== Former royal house ====
Arms of the head of the house, former Prince of Naples (or Piedmont)	Arms of his Heir; the Prince of Piedmont (or Naples)	Savoy-Genoa (extinct)	Savoy-Aosta

=== Denmark ===
==== Royal family ====
Arms of the King	Arms of Christian, Crown Prince of Denmark, these arms are identical to those of the King, but the external ornaments are different.	Arms of Prince Joachim (the King's brother), identical to the arms of the King and Crown Prince, but the inescutcheon is parted per pale Oldenburg and Laborde de Monpezat, his father's family.	Arms of the sisters of Queen; Margrethe II, Princesses; Anne Marie (formerly Queen of the Hellenes) and Benedikte; also borne by the Queen prior to her accession. These arms are the same as those of the late Frederik IX, only with differing external ornaments.

=== Belgium ===
==== Royal family ====
The following heraldic system was adopted by a royal decree in 2019. Prior to this the system of royal cadency was unclear.

Arms of King Philippe of Belgium	Arms of the Duchess of Brabant, the heir apparent Princess Elisabeth, Duchess of Brabant	Arms of a prince of Belgium, a descendant of King Leopold I	Arms of a princess of Belgium	Arms of a prince of the Royal House of Belgium	Arms of a princess of the Royal House of Belgium

=== The Netherlands ===
==== Royal family ====
The following heraldic system was adopted by a royal decree in 1815 and was in effect until 1907.

Monarch	Prince of Orange (heir apparent)	Eldest son of the Prince of Orange	Second son of the monarch	Eldest daughter of the monarch

Since 1907, the system has differed. Wilhelmina further decreed that in perpetuity her descendants should be styled "princes and princesses of Orange-Nassau" and that the name of the house would be "Orange-Nassau" (in Dutch "Oranje-Nassau"). Since then, individual members of the House of Orange-Nassau are also given their own arms by the reigning monarch, similar to the United Kingdom. This is usually the royal arms, quartered with the arms of the principality of Orange, and an in escutcheon of their paternal arms.

Since 1907, there is no system to delineate individual princes and princesses via their arms.

Arms of the King of the Netherlands

Juliana of the Netherlands & Oranje-Nassau Personal Arms, (escutcheon of Mecklenburg)

Arms of the children of Juliana of the Netherlands, Beatrix of the Netherlands & Oranje-Nassau and her sisters Princess Irene, Princess Margriet and Princess Christina (escutcheon of Lippe)

Arms of the children of Beatrix of the Netherlands, currently used by Prince Constantijn, brother of the King, and his children. These arms were borne by the King before his accession and also by Prince Friso, the King's other, late brother, before his marriage. (escutcheon of Amsberg)

Arms for the children of King William Alexander of the Netherlands, Catharina-Amalia, Princess of Orange, Princess Ariane and Princess Alexia (escutcheon of Zorreguieta).

Arms for the children of Princess Margriet of the Netherlands, Prince Maurits, Prince Bernhard, Prince Pieter-Christiaan and Prince Floris of Orange-Nassau, van Vollenhoven (escutcheon of Van Vollenhoven).

=== Portugal ===
The Portuguese systems of differencing have their origins in the regulations of King Manuel I, who ruled Portugal from 1495 to 1521. There are two systems, one for the non-Royal families and the other for the Royal House.

==== Noble families ====
The Portuguese system of differentiation for the noble non-Royal families is unlike any other cadency system. It is true that the brisure personalises the arms, however, since the Portuguese have an arbitrary choice of surnames, they may select any family name from the father's or mother's side of their genealogical table and a coat of arms, which does not have to coincide with it. Thus, the system of differencing only serves to show from which ancestral line the arms are derived. The head of the lineage uses the arms without a difference, but should he be the head of more than one family, the arms are combined by quartering. The heir apparent to the arms of the head of a lineage never uses a mark of difference.

==== Royal house ====
Arms of the Duke of Braganza, head of the Royal house	Arms of Isabel, Duchess of Braganza, wife of the Duke of Braganza	Arms of Don Alfonso, Prince of Beira and Duke of Barcelos, Eldest son of the Duke of Braganza	Arms of Infanta Maria Francisca, daughter of the Duke and Duchess of Braganza	Arms of Infante Dinis, Duke of Porto, younger son of the Duke of Braganza. The castle on the label is taken from the arms of his mother

=== Spain ===
==== Royal family ====
Arms of the King	Arms of Princess Leonor, Heiress presumptive

=== Sweden ===
==== Royal house ====
Arms of King Carl XVI Gustaf	Arms of Crown Princess Victoria, Duchess of Västergötland, eldest daughter of Carl XVI Gustaf	Arms of Princess Estelle, Duchess of Östergötland, daughter of Princess Victoria	Arms of Prince Carl Phillip, Duke of Värmland, only son of Carl XVI Gustaf	Arms of Princess Madeleine, Duchess of Hälsingland, younger daughter of Carl XVI Gustaf	Arms of Princess Leonore, Duchess of Gotland, daughter of Princess Madeleine
