= Silverton Park =

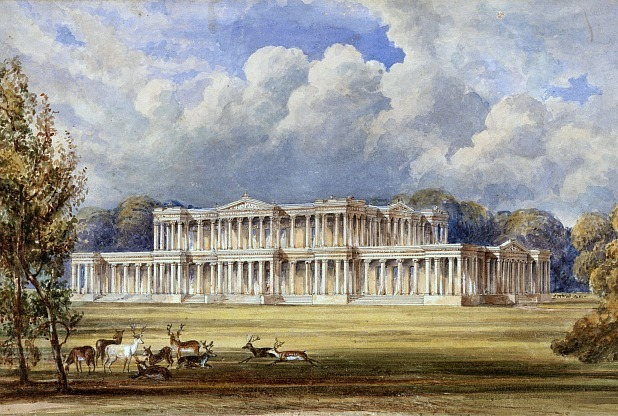
- Silverton Park, south front

- Location within Devon
- Alternative names: Egremont House

General information
- Status: Demolished, stables survive
- Architectural style: Neoclassical
- Location: Silverton, Devon, England
- Coordinates: 50°48′51.2″N 3°27′47.2″W
- Groundbreaking: 1838
- Demolished: 1901 (main house)
- Landlord: Landmark Trust

Design and construction
- Architect: James Thomas Knowles

Silverton Park, also known locally as Egremont House, was a large neoclassical mansion in the parish of Silverton, Devon, England.

== History ==
It was built between 1838 and 1845 by George Wyndham, 4th Earl of Egremont, and demolished in 1901. It was, according to the architectural historians Nikolaus Pevsner and Bridget Cherry "an extraordinary design, entirely clothed in colonnades", but in the opinion of Bernard Coleridge, 2nd Baron Coleridge was "a monstrous Italian house". The stable block, also designed in a neoclassical style, survives and is managed as a holiday let by the Landmark Trust.

In October 2021, the stables was one of 142 sites across England to receive part of a £35-million injection into the government's Culture Recovery Fund.

== Construction ==
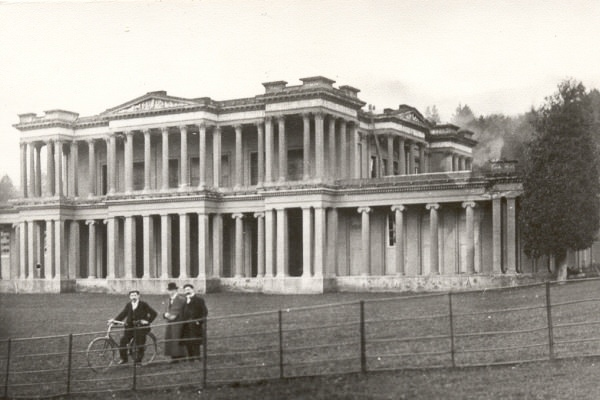
Pre-1901 photograph of Silverton Park, south front viewed from the south-east

Silverton Park was built by George Wyndham, a British naval officer who retired from the service in 1825. In 1837, his uncle, George Wyndham, 3rd Earl of Egremont died, leaving only illegitimate children; George therefore inherited the Egremont title, although the Egremont seat of Petworth House in Sussex and the ancestral wealth passed to the 3rd Earl's eldest son.

George set about building a grand mansion in 1838 using the architect James Thomas Knowles. At the core of the new building was an older house called Combesatchfield, which Knowles surrounded with classical features, constructed in brick with a render of patented, metallic cement. A frieze depicting the Exodus of the Israelites into Egypt was sculpted on the external cornice. The interior was richly furnished. A classical stable block was built alongside the house. George borrowed heavily and increased rents to pay for the hugely expensive project and died, heavily in debt, in 1845.

== Destruction and later use ==
Surviving stable block

Silverton Park was incomplete when George Wyndham died; his widow died in 1876 but attempts to sell the property failed. The contents were sold off in 1892 and in 1902 the house was demolished, although the stable block was converted for agricultural use.

The surviving stable block is, according to Nikolaus Pevsner and Bridget Cherry, a "monumental pedimented composition around a courtyard" built "in a severely Grecian style". It is the only surviving remnant of the house and was acquired in 1987 by Sir John Smith, founder of the Landmark Trust, who sought to prevent it being converted into flats. In 2004, with the financial assistance of private donors, the Landmark Trust started its restoration for use as self-catering holiday accommodation, completing the project in 2008.

== Art forgeries ==
The art forger Shaun Greenhalgh and his father acquired a copy of the 1892 sale catalogue and used the un-illustrated catalogue descriptions to recreate items, for which the catalogue was used to provide spurious provenances. Their most notorious forgery supported by this false provenance was the so-called "Amarna Princess", made in the Amarna art style of ancient Egypt, which they sold in 2003 to Bolton Museum for £440,000, but were subsequently unmasked as forgers.
