= James Thomas Knowles (1806–1884) =

English architect (1806–1884)

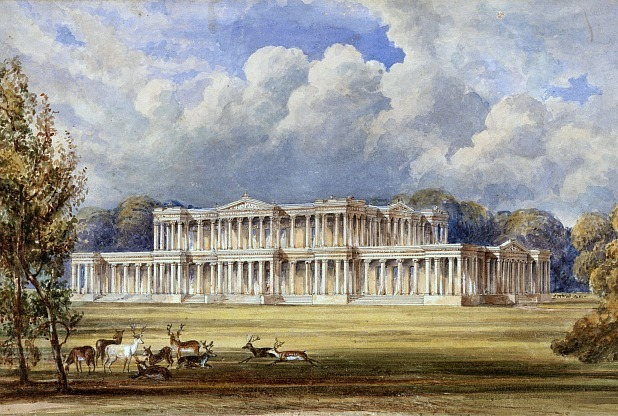
Silverton Park, south front

James Thomas Knowles (1806–1884) was an English architect with an extensive practice, who designed upper-class houses in an Italianate manner more familiar in the work of Sir Charles Barry. The drawings he submitted in the competition for the new Houses of Parliament lost to Barry's.

== Major works ==
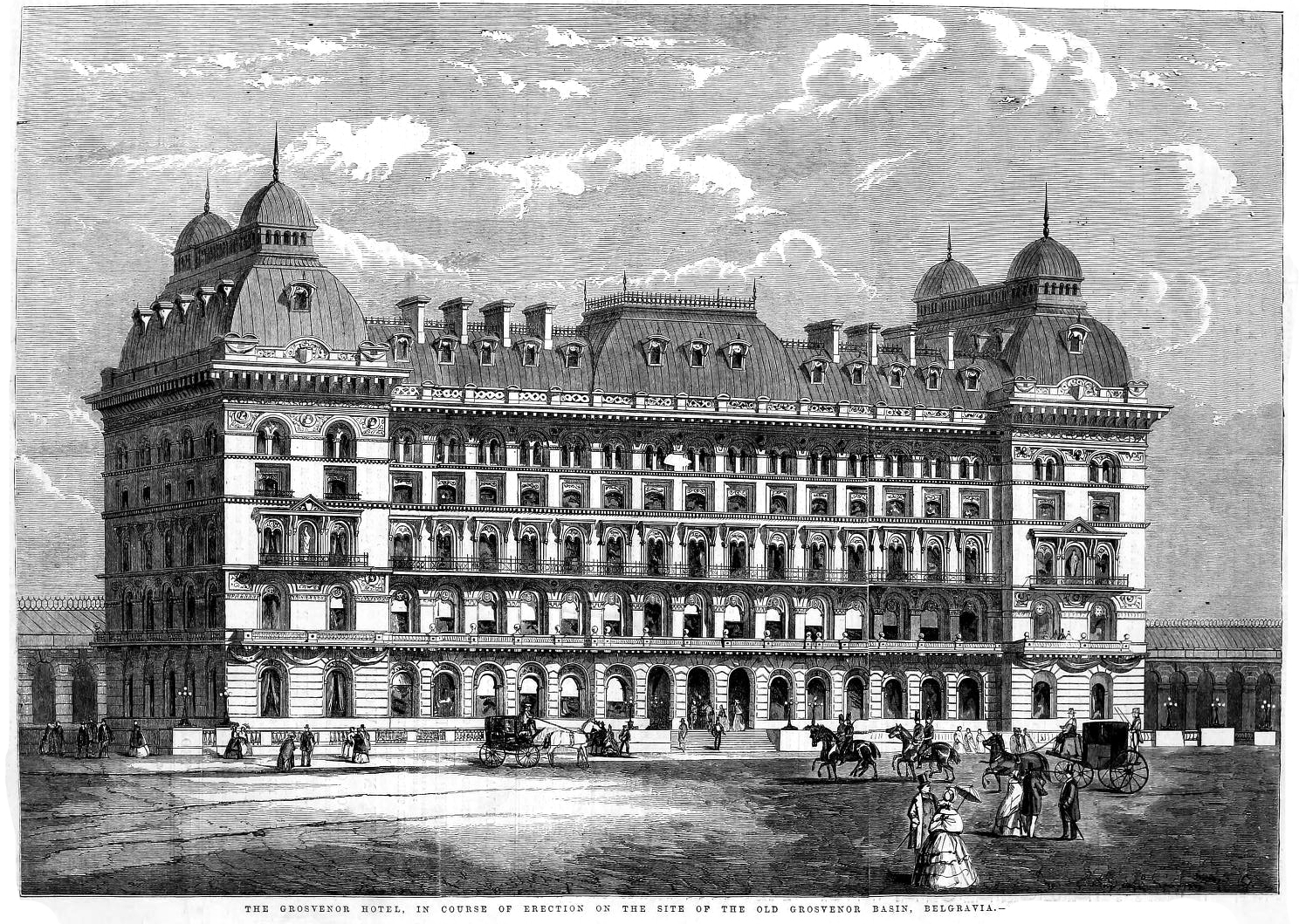
Grosvenor Hotel

In London, Knowles built in 1854 the confident and technically assured palazzo at 15 Kensington Palace Gardens, which is today the official residence of the Ambassador of Finland. Together with his son, Sir James Thomas Knowles, he was responsible for the Grosvenor Hotel at Victoria station.

Knowles provided a vast Italianate mansion at Silverton Park, Devon, for George Wyndham, 4th Earl of Egremont, who had inherited the title but not the family seat of Petworth House, Sussex, and was determined to build a rival. It was not fully complete when the Earl died in 1845, and after a house sale in 1892 had dispersed its contents, it was demolished except for the stables. Over a century later, a brief, unillustrated catalogue description in the 1892 sale inspired the creation of a forgery of an ancient Egyptian portrait head, known as the Amarna Princess.

Knowles also built the Italianate Blackborough House in 1832 for Lord Egremont.

Chosen by Sir Francis Cook to rebuild the Monserrate Palace in Sintra, Portugal, Knowles added to the previous Neo-Gothic construction exotic decoration of mixed neo-Indian and neo-Moorish styles. This Palace of Monserrate, along with the Palace of Pena, is considered to be one of the most important examples of Romantic architecture in Portugal.

One of Knowles's sketchbooks survives in the library of the Royal Institute of British Architects.

His son, Sir James Thomas Knowles, practised as an architect in partnership with his father and edited the Contemporary Review in 1870–1877.
