= Art Fund =

United Kingdom art charity

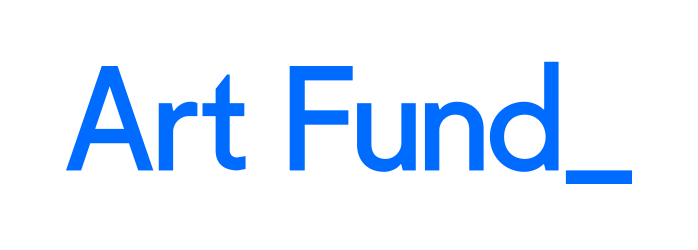
- Founded: 1903; 123 years ago
- Location: London, United Kingdom
- Region served: United Kingdom
- Members: 122,000
- Key people: Jenny Waldman (director) Lord Smith of Finsbury (chairman)
- Revenue: £8,120,000
- Website: artfund.org

Art Fund (formerly the National Art Collections Fund) is an independent membership-based British charity, which raises funds to aid the acquisition of artworks for the nation. It gives grants and acts as a channel for many gifts and bequests, as well as lobbying on behalf of museums and galleries and their users. It relies on members' subscriptions and public donations for funds and does not receive funding from the government or the National Lottery.

Since its foundation in 1903 the Fund has been involved in the acquisition of over 860,000 works of art of every kind, including many of the most famous objects in British public collections, such as Velázquez's Rokeby Venus in the National Gallery, Picasso's Weeping Woman in the Tate collection, the Anglo-Saxon Staffordshire Hoard in Birmingham Museum and Art Gallery and the medieval Canterbury Astrolabe Quadrant in the British Museum.

== History ==
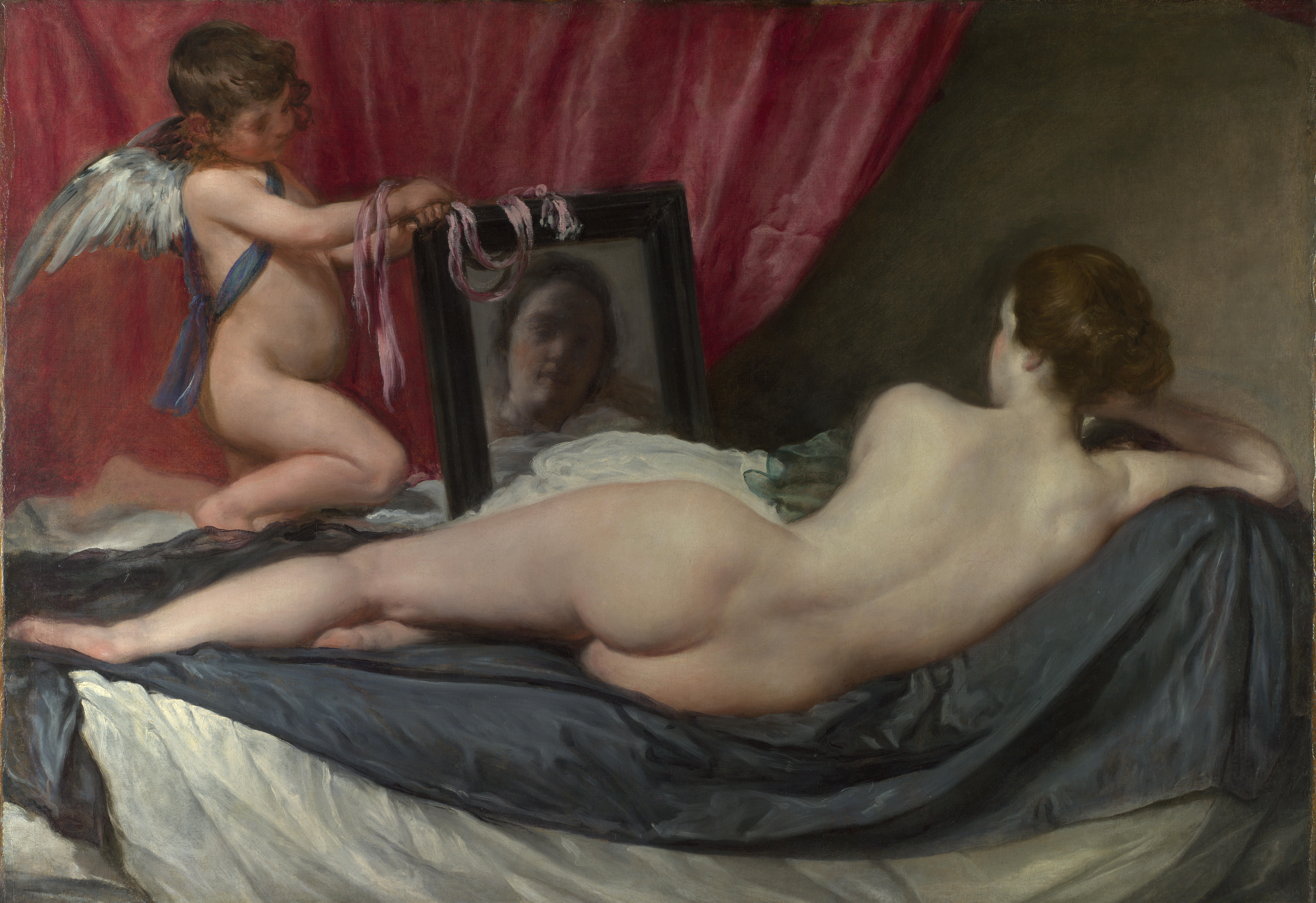
The National Art Collections Fund assisted with the purchase of Velázquez's Rokeby Venus in 1906.

The original idea for an arts charity can be traced to a lecture given by John Ruskin in 1857 when he called for the establishment of a "great society" to save works of art for public collections and "watch over" them.

At the start of the 20th century owners of private art collections, under financial pressure, began to auction off many great works of art, often to wealthy citizens of other countries. Artist and critic D. S. MacColl published his concerns and suggested setting up a public organisation to fundraise. The National Art Collections Fund was founded in 1903 in order to help museums and galleries acquire works of art. The founders, who included MacColl, Christiana Herringham, Roger Fry and Robin Benson, were prompted by what they saw as the inadequacy of government funding of museums. Members paid a guinea per year, and donations were welcomed. Herringham wrote to Lord Balcarres, the first chairman, "If we are to influence public opinion we ought only to buy for the nation work that is of its kind first-class… It should be worthy of a prominent place and we should be proud to have presented to the Nation work of intrinsically fine quality." An early campaign by the Fund was to acquire Velázquez's Rokeby Venus.

Art critic Frank Rutter said it made him "boil with rage" that the Fund had spent thousands of pounds on Old Master paintings, some of which he considered of dubious merit or condition, but "would not contribute one half penny" to his appeal in 1905 to buy the first Impressionist painting for the National Gallery, although it welcomed the prestige of presenting the painting, Eugène Boudin's The Entrance to Trouville Harbour, the following year. He said "the Fund's inertia and snobbish ineptitude are entirely characteristic of the art-officialdom in England."

In 2005 the Fund was caught up in the controversy surrounding the purchase by the Tate gallery of The Upper Room by Chris Ofili.

In the summer of 2006 the organisation's name was changed from National Art Collections Fund to The Art Fund. The operational name was subsequently simplified to Art Fund (without a definite article).

Also in 2006, the Fund was caught out when it was discovered that the Amarna Princess, purportedly an ancient Egyptian sculpture, was actually a forgery by Shaun Greenhalgh.

== Fundraising campaigns ==
In addition to using its own funds to help museums and galleries acquire art, Art Fund organises national fundraising campaigns to secure significant works of art that are in danger of being lost from public view.

In 2009 Art Fund led a fundraising campaign to save the Staffordshire Hoard, a collection of over 3,500 gold and silver artefacts discovered in Staffordshire. Over £900,000 was raised through public donations, and the campaign received substantial funds from trusts and foundations. As a result of the campaign, the £3.3 million treasure was acquired for Birmingham Museum and Art Gallery and the Potteries Museum & Art Gallery, Stoke-on-Trent.

In 2010 The Procession to Calvary by Pieter Brueghel the Younger, which had been hung in Wakefield's Nostell Priory for over 200 years, came under risk of being sold on the open market. Art Fund worked with the National Trust to raise the £2.7 million required to purchase the painting for the National Trust's art collection.

In 2013 King and McGaw partnered with Art Everywhere, a charitable project putting on the world's largest art exhibition. This filled 22,000 billboards across the UK with art prints with all the profits going to Art Fund. The following year the campaign was expanded to 30,000 billboards displaying 25 artworks including the Study of Cirrus Clouds by John Constable, The Circle of Lustful by William Blake and A Lady with a Squirrel and a Starling by Hans Holbein the Younger.

== Museum of the Year ==
External videos
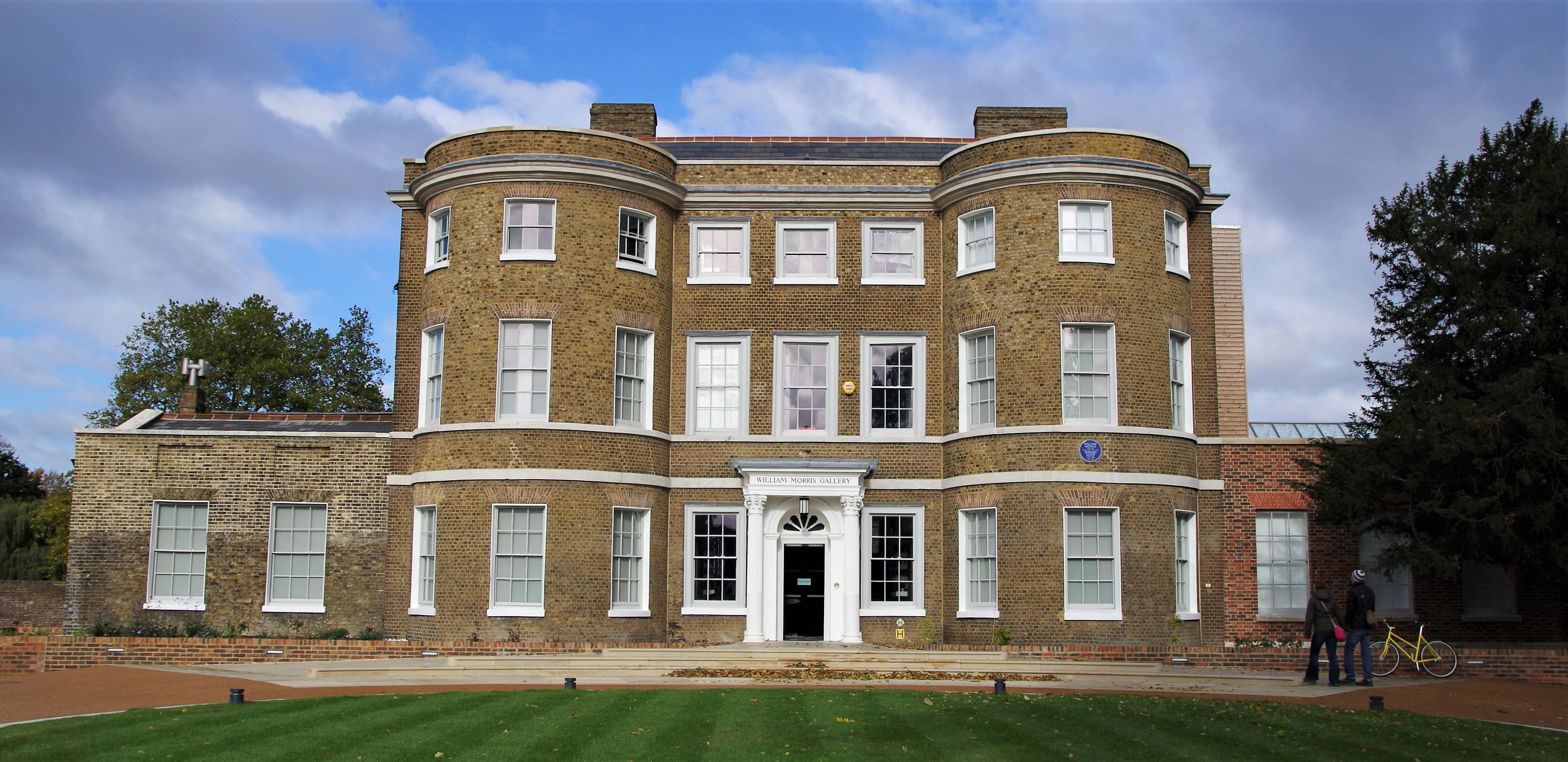
- William Morris Gallery – Museum of the Year 2013, (2:30), ArtFundUK

Art Fund sponsors the Museum of the Year award (known as the Gulbenkian Prize from 2003 to 2007 and the Art Fund Prize from 2008 to 2012). This is a £100,000 prize awarded annually to the museum or gallery that had the most imaginative, innovative or popular project during the previous year.

== Artist Rooms ==
In 2008 Art Fund helped Tate and the National Galleries of Scotland acquire ARTIST ROOMS, a collection of postwar and contemporary art. Since then Art Fund has supported a tour of the collection around the UK, as well as providing additional funds to help museum display the works. By the beginning of 2011 ARTIST ROOMS tours had been seen by approximately 12 million people across Britain.

== See also ==
- AccessArt
