= Risley Park Lanx =

Roman silver lanx discovered in 1729

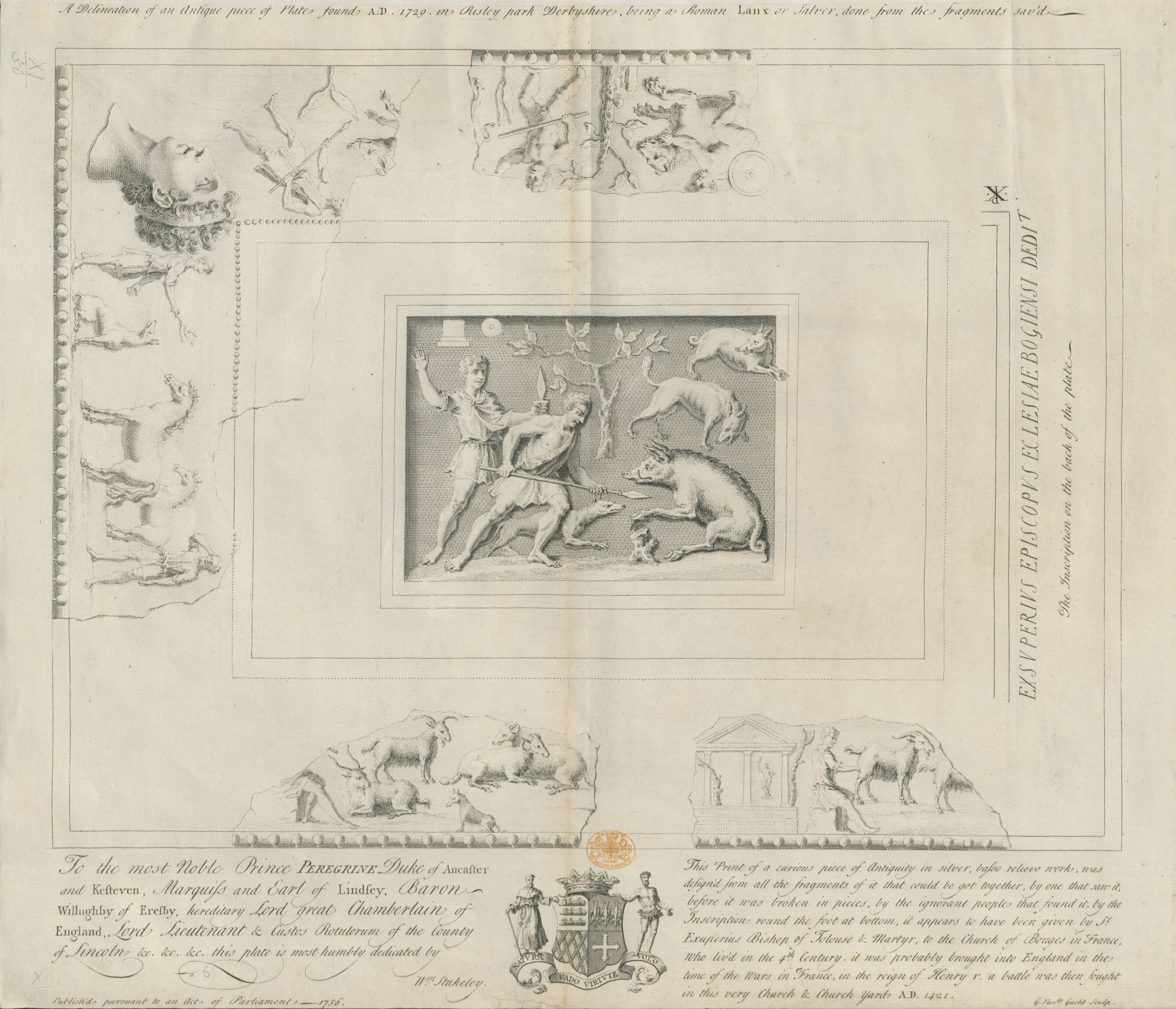
1736 engraving of the Lanx by Gerard Vandergucht

The Risley Park Lanx is a large Roman silver dish (or lanx) that was discovered in 1729 in Risley Park, Derbyshire, and was later lost from view. In Roman times, a lanx was generally a large serving platter, about 15 by 20 inches in size. Particularly ornamented ones were used to make offerings or sacrifices. The inscription on the Risley Park Lanx suggests it was used as "church plate".

Subsequently, lost, the Risley Park Lanx re-emerged in the 1990s, as a supposed heirloom of the now-notorious art forger Shaun Greenhalgh and his family. Bought by private buyers and donated to the British Museum, it was on display for several years, but was removed when its authenticity became suspect. It was later determined to be a complete fabrication. The fate of the original, genuine, Risley Park Lanx is unknown.

== Original discovery at Risley Park ==
In 1729, a large silver dish was ploughed up at Risley Park, Derbyshire, and broken into pieces soon after its discovery. Lady Aston (Catherine Widdrington 1676–1752 m 1723 Thomas Aston 1655–1725), the owner of Risley Park, was in contact with the pioneer archaeologist William Stukeley about it, though it was some years before he acted. Indeed, there is some doubt as to whether he ever actually saw the lanx himself. However he became sufficiently interested after the discovery of the Corbridge Lanx to have Gerard Vandergucht make line drawings and an engraving of the remaining pieces. Vandergucht certainly saw them, and may well be the "one that saw it" mentioned in the testament inscribed at the bottom of the engravings:

This print of a curious piece of Antiquity in silver... was defined from all the fragments of it that could be got together, by one that saw it, before it was broken in pieces, by the ignorant peoples that found it.

Stukeley, at a meeting of the Society of Antiquaries in 1736, read his account, which was later published, complete with a dedication underneath the drawing of the lanx:

To the most noble prince PEREGRINE duke of Ancaſter and keſteven, Marquis and Earl of Lindſey, Baron Willughby of Ereſby, hereditary Lord great Chamberlain of England, Lord Lieutenant & Custos Rotuleram of the county of Lincoln &c, &c, &c...

== Description and origins ==
This lanx, what was left of it, was decorated with pastoral and hunting motifs around the edges, and at the centre was a scene from a boar hunt, similar to the pagan ones on the Mildenhall bowls. On one fragment there was also a curious scene of a cherubic figure riding a lion.

Like the Corbridge Lanx, the Risley Park one was done in a raised relief style with cast figures. The inscription "round the foot at bottom" was on the back and reads "Exsuperius episcopus ecclesiae Bagiensi dedit" ("Bishop Exuperius gives this to the church of Bagiensi"). This has inspired several different possible theories of the lanx's origin, depending on interpretation of the word "Bagiensi".

Stukeley conjectured that it belonged to Exuperius, the Bishop of Tholouse in 405 AD, who gave it to the Bouge church in Touraine, and that it only ended up in England after it was plundered as spoils of the Battle of Bouge in 1421. However, this turns on his reading of "Bagiensi" as "Bogiensi", whereas the Abbe de la Rue's considered choice was Exuperius of Bayeux as a more likely candidate. This Exuperius was the Bishop of Bayeux, and it was suggested that he had gifted the lanx to his own church, before it was plundered by Henry I after he wrested the city from his brother Duke Robert in 1106.

A third theory suggests that the lanx was actually cast in Roman Britain by a local pewterer and "eventually came into the possession of an important Christian", another Exuperius. He gave it to a rural estate called "Bogium", which was possibly a Roman estate in Derbyshire.

Whatever its origins, shortly after its discovery the "Risley Park Lanx", as it became known, disappeared again.

== "Rediscovery" ==
In 1991, the elderly George Greenhalgh came forward with an item resembling the Risley Park Lanx, claiming that he and his family had found the pieces and welded them together. In fact, the piece had been crafted by his son, Shaun, based on an article written by Catherine Johns in 1981, and Stukeley's 1736 account. George also presented a forged will that apparently bequeathed the Risley Park Lanx to his family. The British Museum was unconvinced that this was the original lanx, but nevertheless considered it probable that it was a genuine period replica. The original had been fragile, therefore it was feasible that "moulds of the pieces were taken and copies cast". No suspicions were raised by the fact that the pieces did not match the arrangement in the Stukeley engraving – itself a mere guess by Vandergucht, who had less than half of the lanx to work with. They could have reasonably been the remaining original pieces put together differently at a later date.

Furthermore, it has been claimed that the Greenhalghs had cleverly invested in some actual Roman silver coins, which they melted down to create the lanx. This complicated the matter of authenticity. NB: Greenhalgh strongly denies this, arguing that the cost of such coins would have been prohibitive, the necessity is nonexistent since alloys can be (and are) mixed by counterfeiters, and that he was not willing to consider, let alone engage in, the 'wanton destruction of thousands of ancient artefacts'. Radiographic analysis also showed that different era solders had been used, suggesting it had been recast in the eighteenth or nineteenth century, perhaps using fragments of the original.

In the event, the Risley Park Lanx was sold through Sotheby's in 1992 for £100,000. This was far less than the purported worth of the original – a million pounds – yet still a clear indication that it was considered to be a significant historical rediscovery. When "two wealthy Americans" gifted the lanx to the British Museum in honour of David Wilson, outgoing director of the Museum, it was placed on display as a replica. It remained there until the rising publicity over the Greenhalghs forced its withdrawal for reassessment.

However, even after the Greenhalghs were exposed as forgers, the Museum remained ambivalent about the worth of their lanx. Andrew Burnett, Deputy Director said: "There have been different views of it and it's something we're looking at again in the light of the Amarna Princess case. We haven't formed a final view on it yet."

== See also ==
- Known forgeries of Shaun Greenhalgh
  - Amarna Princess
  - The Faun
