= The Faun =

Sculpture forgery

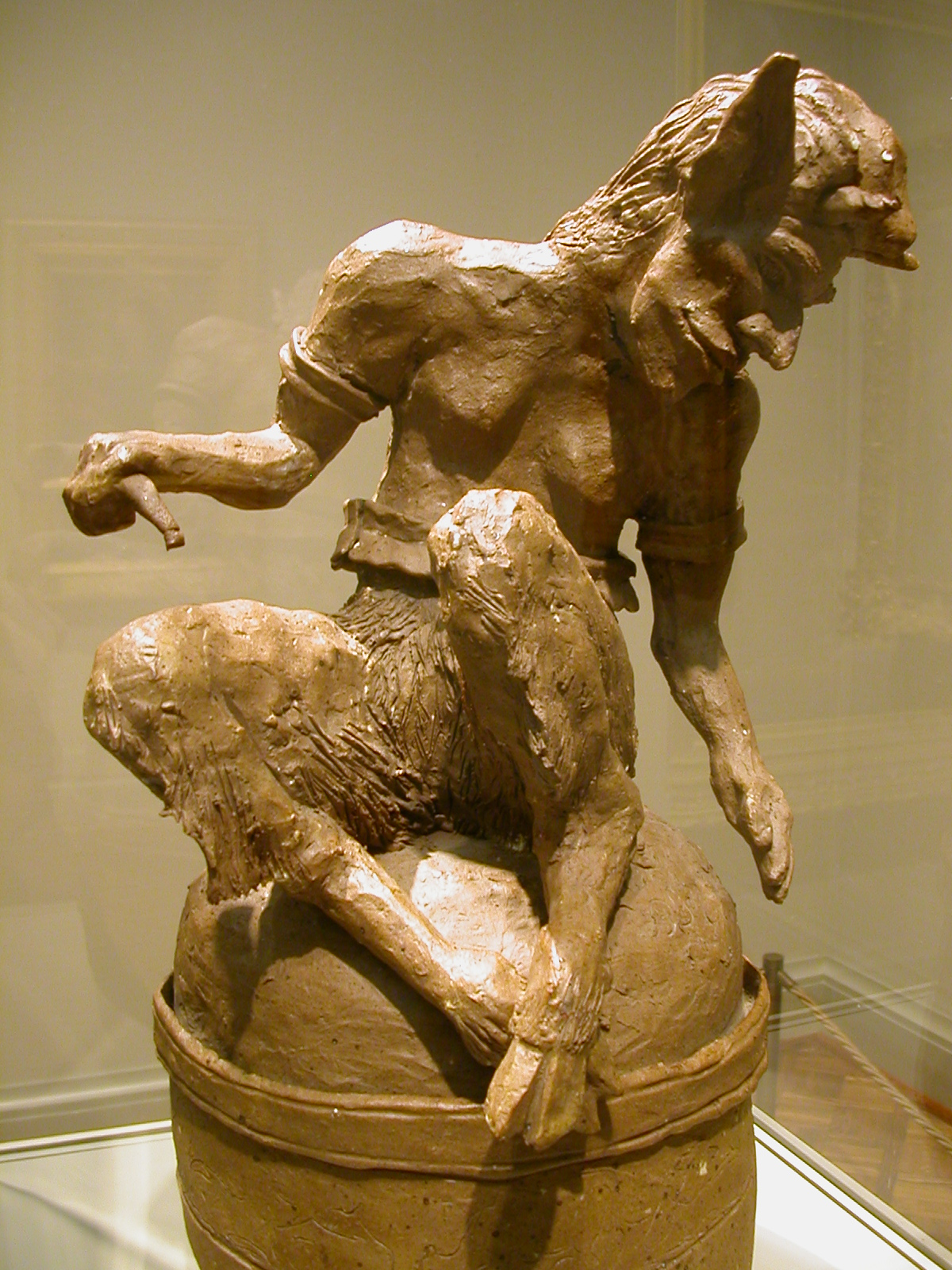
The Faun

The Faun is a sculpture by British forger Shaun Greenhalgh. He successfully passed it off as a work by Paul Gauguin, selling it at Sotheby's for £20,700 in 1994. Three years later, in 1997, it was bought by the Art Institute of Chicago for an undisclosed sum, thought to be about $125,000. It was hailed by them as "one of its most important acquisitions in the last twenty years."

For a decade the sculpture remained on display, and was part of a major joint exhibition on Gauguin with the van Gogh Museum in Amsterdam. However, following revelations about its existence at Greenhalgh's trial in 2007, The Faun was tracked down by The Art Newspaper to Chicago and exposed as a fake.

In October 2007, the Art Institute removed the statue from display, and announced that it was seeking compensation from Sotheby's. What the ultimate fate of The Faun is to be has not yet been revealed.

== Background to the forgery ==
In the early to mid 1990s, Shaun Greenhalgh was predominately involved with paintings. He sold a Samuel Peploe, but in particular he was successful with his Thomas Morans. He sold one to Bolton Museum in 1994 and at New York City auctions in 1995 he sold seven, and is reckoned to have produced as many as 40. Yet at the same time, he must have been researching the possibility of at least one Gauguin work. As well as The Faun, he is known to have also forged a Gauguin vase, possibly at a later date.

Gauguin is significantly less well regarded for his sculptures than for his paintings. It is likely that Greenhalgh was aware of that, and saw it as an opportunity. Forgers typically focus on the lower priced artworks of major artists, for though they offer fewer returns, they are subject to much less scrutiny. Moreover, Gauguin had left just enough of a record to indicate he may have been interested in producing such an item, a drawing of a faun sculpture in a sketchbook from 1887. This was backed up by suggestive historical events: at a Gauguin exhibition in 1906, a "faun ceramic" was displayed, and another listing for a work entitled "Faun" was found for a 1917 Nunes and Fiquet gallery exhibition. Scholars in the 1960s dutifully recorded these possibilities. Even in 2007, experts were still uncertain about how many ceramic sculptures Gauguin had actually produced. Estimates range from 55 to 80. Of these, between 30 and 60 are thought to be lost or destroyed.

Greenhalgh was adept at obtaining and working in a wide variety of materials, and not only used a stoneware that fitted in well with what Gauguin demonstrably used, he managed to produce something "which had no obvious features to reveal it as a modern fake". At 47 cm, it was modest, yet typically sized for a Gauguin. The gallery caption of The Faun read "unglazed stoneware with touches of gold gilding". Use of the gold gilding was deft; it was similar to investments Greenhalgh had made on previous forgeries. In 1991, for example, he is thought to have melted down genuine Roman silver coins when reconstructing the Risley Park Lanx. Any anomalies in The Faun that were detected were explained away.

== Sold twice over ==
In 1995, The Faun was sold at Sotheby's for £20,700. The Greenhalghs, who worked together as a family, had constructed a provenance based around Olive Greenhalgh (Shaun's mother), using her maiden name "Roscoe". She claimed to be a descendant of Roderick O'Conor, a friend of Gauguin's purported to have bought the sculpture at the 1917 exhibition, and known to have bought at least one other. Legitimising their ownership through inheritance was a typical ploy of the Greenhalghs, as was forging documents to go with it. In this case, Olive produced a copy of the sale invoice.

There were no concerns about authenticity. As well as being well received by Sotheby's itself, The Faun was authenticated by the Wildenstein Institute in Paris. Their catalogue raisonné had not yet been published when the sculpture was sold on 30 November, but the auction house had received a letter two weeks beforehand indicating The Faun's incorporation.

The first buyers were experienced London art dealers Howie and Pillar. They lived with it for years and described it as "a wonderful object". When the curator for the Art Institute of Chicago, Douglas Druick, saw The Faun he was reportedly "intrigued" and "very keen to acquire it". Subsequently, the Art Institute carried out their own research into the authenticity of the item and purchased it in 1997, for what was thought to be about $125,000. However, to this day, the Art Institute has refused to reveal actual details of the price it paid. What is known is that the purchase was funded, at least in part, by the Major Acquisitions Centennial Endowment and is associated with the estate of Suzette Morton Davidson. At any rate, the Art Institute plans to seek compensation from Sotheby's.

== The "good sculpture" ==
Purchase of The Faun was proclaimed as a great success. Chief curator Douglas Druick declared it Gauguin's "first ceramic". In 2001, The Art Institute sculpture curator, Ian Wardropper, said it was one of the most important acquisitions in the last twenty years. The Faun was included in a publication of Chicago's "Notable Acquisitions". It was accepted by a specialist in Gauguin ceramics, Anne-Birgitte Fonsmark. The consensus of analysis was that the half-man half-goat fitted with Gauguin's known exploration of primitivism, and various attempts were made to provide a detailed interpretation of The Faun's sexuality in terms of Gauguin's relationships. Druick noted "the absence of the often flaunted sign of a faun’s virility, resulting in an aura of impotence". Even after it was exposed as a forgery, James Cuno, the director of the Art Institute, still described it as "good sculpture".

== The "Van Gogh and Gauguin" exhibition ==
On September 21, 2001, The Faun became part of a major exhibition, "Van Gogh and Gauguin: The Studio of the South". Organised as a joint venture between The Art Institute of Chicago and the van Gogh Museum in Amsterdam, the event ran for four months in Chicago before shifting to Amsterdam. Funding was unprecedented, with support from the Federal Council on the Arts and the Humanities, and a $1.5 million grant from the Ameritech Foundation. The exhibition brought together works from "63 public and private collections around the world, including the U.S., Canada, Europe, Israel, Japan and Russia". It took years to prepare. Joseph Harriss wrote in the Smithsonian:

New findings from the archives and technical research using microscopic study, x-radiography, thread counts, and fiber- and paint-sample analysis have allowed curators to piece together an almost day-to-day picture of the ... collaboration [between Gauguin and van Gogh].

Promoters described the exhibition as "extraordinary" and a "serious and very beautiful show." Art critic Suzanne Hoefaerkamp felt viewers were "unified by their experience of great art."

Of the 134 items on display, most were paintings, plus three Japanese prints by Hokusai, Hiroshige and Korin. The focus of the exhibition, and the critics, was very much on the interplay between the paintings. In fact, there were only seven sculptures, all by Gauguin. The others were Portrait Vase of Jeanne Schuffenecker, Cleopatra Pot, Leda and the Swan, Self-portrait Jug, Self-portrait Jar, and Female Nude with Flower (known as Lust). The slideshow for the exhibition was arranged chronologically, so that The Faun (slide 02) could be clearly seen as Gauguin's first ceramic. Equally self-evident is how well the forgery fitted in thematically.

== Exposure and reaction ==
In 2007, Shaun Greenhalgh was convicted for money laundering, predominately over the Amarna Princess. However, during the trial, the variety and number of his other forgeries were widely noted. Scotland Yard admitted that many were likely to be still undetected. Picking up on references to the Gauguin faun, The Art Newspaper launched its own investigation and tracked The Faun down to the Art Institute in Chicago.

The Art Institute was quick to emphasise, in a statement on its website, that the sculpture came with provenance from respected sources, and The Faun was "never a principal focus of the [Greenhalgh] investigation". Douglas Druick, the chief curator, described The Faun as "creative [and] well-researched". James Cuno, the director, said it was "a crafty concept". According to Ian Wardropper, then the sculpture curator, the provenance was "completely believable". Melaine Clore from Sotheby's described The Faun as a once-in-a-decade forgery. On the process of obtaining artworks, Cuno added: "We make thousands of decisions like this annually. Once in a lifetime something like this happens." However, other commentators speculate that as much as half of the art market is made up of forgeries.

In October 2007, The Faun was removed from Art Institute where it had been on permanent display as part of its Post-Impressionist collection. It remained on the website as part of the "Studio of the South" exhibition slideshow until mid-December. Because Greenhalgh's trial finished before the sculpture was revealed as a forgery, it was not impounded by police, but the Art Institute was reportedly in discussion about compensation with Sotheby's and the private dealer.
