= Amarna Princess =

Forgery of an ancient Egyptian statue

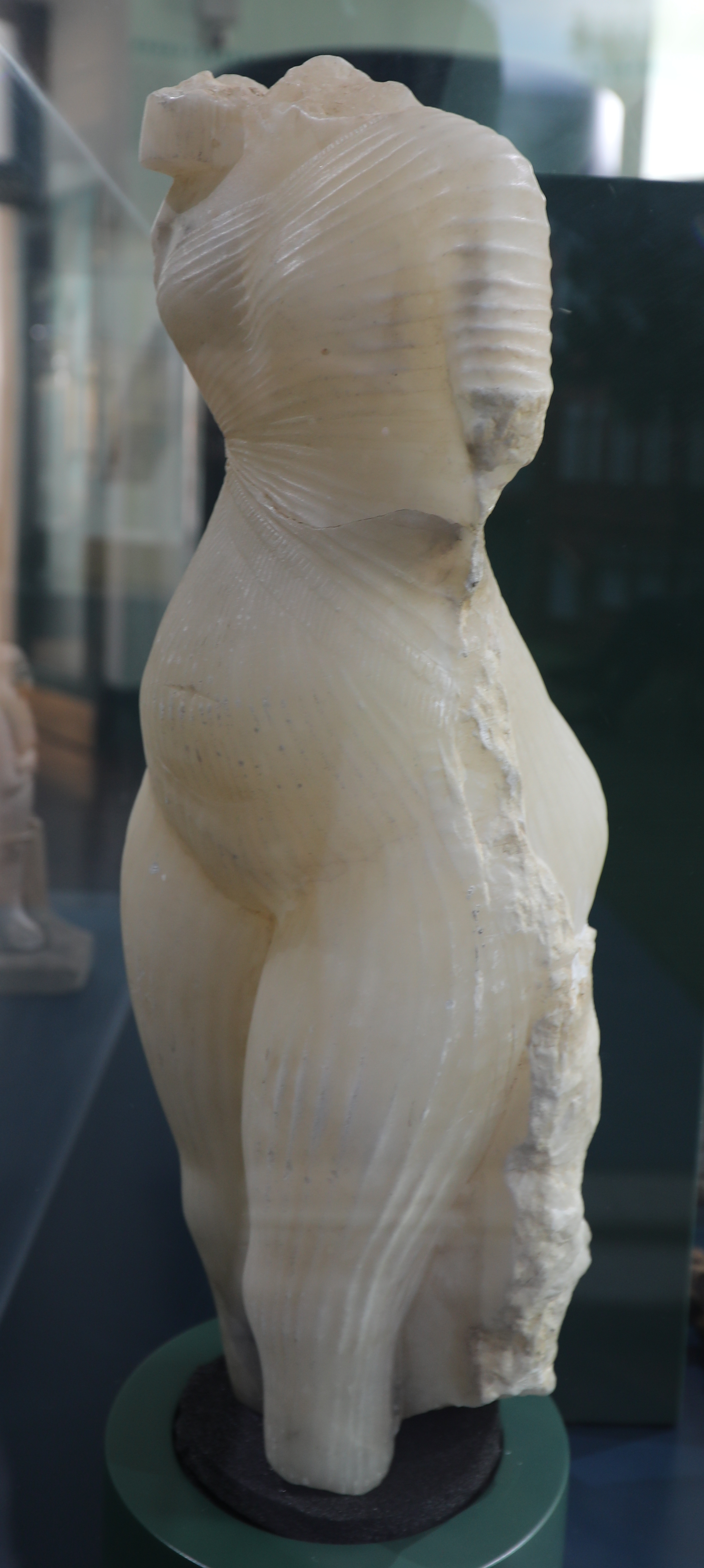
The Amarna Princess

The Amarna Princess, sometimes referred to as the "Bolton Amarna Princess," is a statue forged by British art forger Shaun Greenhalgh and sold by his father George Sr. to Bolton Museum for £440,000 in 2003. Based on the Amarna art-style of ancient Egypt, the purchase of the Amarna Princess was feted as a "coup" by the museum and it remained on display for three years. However, in November 2005, Greenhalgh was brought under suspicion by Scotland Yard's Arts and Antiquities Unit, and the statue was impounded for further examination in March 2006. It is now displayed as a part of an exhibition of fakes and forgeries.

== Background and preparation ==
In 1999, following some early successes, the Greenhalghs began their most ambitious forgery project yet. They bought the 1892 sale catalogue of the contents of Silverton Park, Devon, the home of George Wyndham, 4th Earl of Egremont. Having failed to inherit Petworth House the 4th Earl began to purchase ancient sculpture such as the Westmacott Jupiter to form his own collection. Therefore either he or one of the previous Earls of Egremont who acquired ancient sculptures from Rome might just have obtained, along with other pieces, the Amarna Princess.. Certainly the auction catalogue notes extended to pages.

Among the lots in the sale were a group lot comprising "a draped figure of a female, five marble statuettes and eight Egyptian figures." The vagueness of the catalogue description was not too surprising for the time, and if any such actual Amarna art had been there, it may well have remained unrecognised. Shaun Greenhalgh was a professional antique dealer and meticulous researcher and must have been well aware of this. While he did not appear to have had access to the internet, he was well used to the trade catalogues and art books and is known to have worked from photographs. Further to the item's natural obscurity, there are only two other similar statuettes existing in the world. These are held in the Louvre and the Penn Museum.

In the event, taking full advantage of the vagueness of the auction notes, Greenhalgh manufactured what became the Amarna Princess, a 52 cm statue, apparently made of a "stunning translucent alabaster." Done in the Egyptian Amarna style of 1350 BC, the statue represents one of the daughters of the Pharaoh Akhenaten and Queen Nefertiti, probable father and stepmother of Tutankhamun. Greenhalgh reputedly "knocked up" his copy in his shed in three weeks out of calcite, "using basic DIY tools and making it look old by coating it in a mixture of tea and clay." A copyist by inclination, his piece was most likely based directly on the known princesses, especially the one in the Louvre. A diagrammatic comparison shows just how close the similarities are, down to the missing limbs. The Amarna Princess being only somewhat taller, by 21 cm (8.3 in).

== Selling the statue ==
George Greenhalgh, the forger's father, then approached the Bolton Museum in 2002, claiming the Amarna was from his great-grandfather's "forgotten collection," bought at the Silverton Park auction. His great-grandfather had purportedly bought "one of two" Egyptian statues available.

George pretended to be ignorant about its true worth or value but was careful to provide the letters Shaun had also faked, showing how the artefact had been in the family for "a hundred years." He told them he was "thinking about using it as a garden ornament." And further, he claimed it had been valued at a mere £500.

=== Authentication ===
After their own examination of the Amarna Princess Bolton Museum passed it on to others to evaluate, in accordance with their stated best practices. In the first instance this role fell to Christie's, who valued the statue at £500,000. The British Museum also agreed that it was a genuine piece. It has not been revealed exactly what tests were taken or what criteria used to assess the authenticity of the Amarna Princess, beyond the declaration that provenance played "a vital part in the authentication because there was nothing to compare it with," apart from the Louvre Princess, although in her analysis Angela Thomas, the Egyptology curator of the Bolton Museum, mentioned various other statues from the era as well, most notably the Penn Museum princess. Assessment was also hampered because of the difficulty of testing stone.

More than just impressed by the provenance, experts also concluded that "although its head, arms and lower legs have not survived...the statuette is the most impressive example of its kind in the world." Angela Thomas provided an analysis that suggested a close examination of the item itself. She noted the back pillar which showed that it was "once part of a double statue." Elements of its "extreme style" suggested it was an early era piece, which was enough for her to speculate on which of the six daughters the statue might represent, Meritaten – despite the absence of an inscription, or a head. She concluded the Amarna Princess was of "great significance."

=== Funding and purchase ===
The purchase of the Amarna Princess for £439,767 in 2003 made "headlines around the world." The Bolton Museum considered its purchase a "coup," since the statue was purported to be worth closer to a £1 million. The explanation of its apparent cheapness was that the vendor wanted it to stay in Bolton.

After the forgery was exposed, there was great interest in the exact source of the funding. It was composed of "£360,000 from the National Heritage Memorial Fund, a further £75,000 from the National Art Collections Fund and £2,500 from the Friends of Bolton Museum and Art Gallery," plus a further £1,500 from the J. B. Gass Trust. Bolton Museum detailed the financing on their website and gave reassurances that no council money was involved.

== On display ==
The Amarna Princess first went on public display in the Hayward Gallery as part of the prestigious "Saved!" exhibition of 2003. Opened by the Queen the exhibition was meant as a "celebration of 100 years of saving art for the [British] nation." Billed as "spectacular," it spanned "4,000 years of art history," which would have made the Amarna Princess one of the oldest items there, had it been genuine.

On January 31, 2004, the Amarna Princess returned to "pride of place" at Bolton Museum, where it was expected to be a huge draw as the "jewel in the crown" of the museum's highly regarded Egyptian collection. It was set among other items of the same era, including sculptures. The museum's Egyptian curator, Angela Thomas, speculated "It may even be the case that this will lead on to us getting further funds to do more." As a final ironic note, extra security was installed due to a theft in the museum the week before.

== Exposed as forgery ==
In mid-March 2006 Scotland Yard's Arts and Antiquities Unit impounded the Amarna Princess as part of an ongoing investigation of the Greenhalgh family. The Greenhalghs had triggered suspicions when they tried to perform a similar scam again, using the same provenance to support their ownership of what was purported to be an Assyrian frieze. They were subsequently caught, and both father and sons were charged with laundering the money involved with the Amarna Princess. Shaun Greenhalgh was later convicted in November 2007. On searching their property, police found evidence of tools and material for making sculptures, and two other completed copies of the Amarna Princess.

== Reactions and current status ==
After the trial, Bolton Museum scrambled to distance itself and described itself as "blameless." The museum insisted that it had followed established procedure, though they called George Greenhalgh "a nice old man who had no idea of the significance of what he owned." As more than one commentator has noted: "We are never more likely to be vulnerable to a cheat than when we ourselves are trying to diddle someone out of a masterpiece."

Councillor Barbara Ronson, of Bolton Council, was "shocked" to learn that the statue was a fake and promised the council would be carrying out its own investigation. "You wonder how something like this could happen with the modern technology available." Stephen Johnson, National Heritage Memorial Fund Director was "extremely shocked." He said "the National Heritage Memorial Fund has not been in this position before in its 26-year history."

Both the National Heritage Memorial Fund and the National Art Collection Fund indicated that they might seek to recover their monies, as it had not been used for the "Approved Purposes;" while Bolton Museum said the Council, too, expected to receive compensation.

However, the presiding judge, William Morris, exonerated the institution and any Council staff involved, preferring to focus on what he saw as "misapplied" talent and an "ambitious conspiracy," and emphasised the sophistication of the deception. One art expert said "the Amarna Princess ... is a reminder that the really good fakes in public and private collections haven't been spotted yet."

In 2011 the statue returned to Bolton Museum, featuring in an exhibition of fakes and forgeries.

== See also ==
- The list of Greenhalgh's known forgeries, including the "second" Risley Park Lanx and the Gauguin Faun.
