= Eadred Reliquary =

The Eadred Reliquary was one of the wide-ranging art forgeries produced by Shaun Greenhalgh and his family, of Bolton, Greater Manchester.

In 1989, Shaun Greenhalgh's father, George, tried to sell to Manchester University a supposed 10th-century Anglo-Saxon silver reliquary, containing a small piece of wood which he claimed was a fragment of the True Cross. He said he had found the vessel while metal detecting in a park in Preston, Lancashire.

Shaun, who had crafted the object, intended it to resemble a known missing Anglo-Saxon piece, dating back to the time of Eadred, the King of England from 946 to 955. The British Museum decided that the reliquary was not genuine, but the Greenhalgh family managed to sell it privately for a modest £100.
