= Amarna art =

Ancient Egyptian artistic period

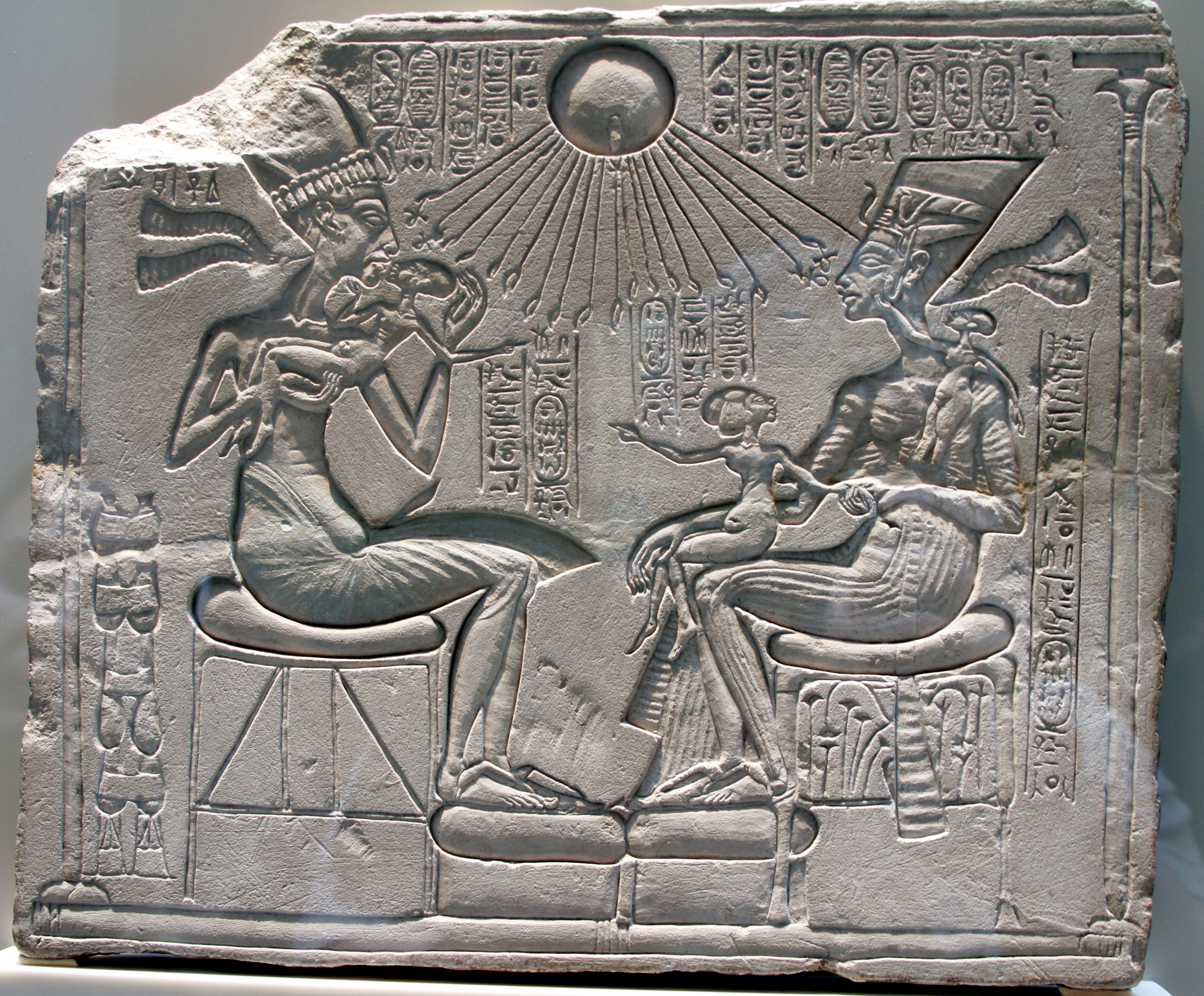
Akhenaten, Nefertiti and three daughters beneath the Aten, Berlin

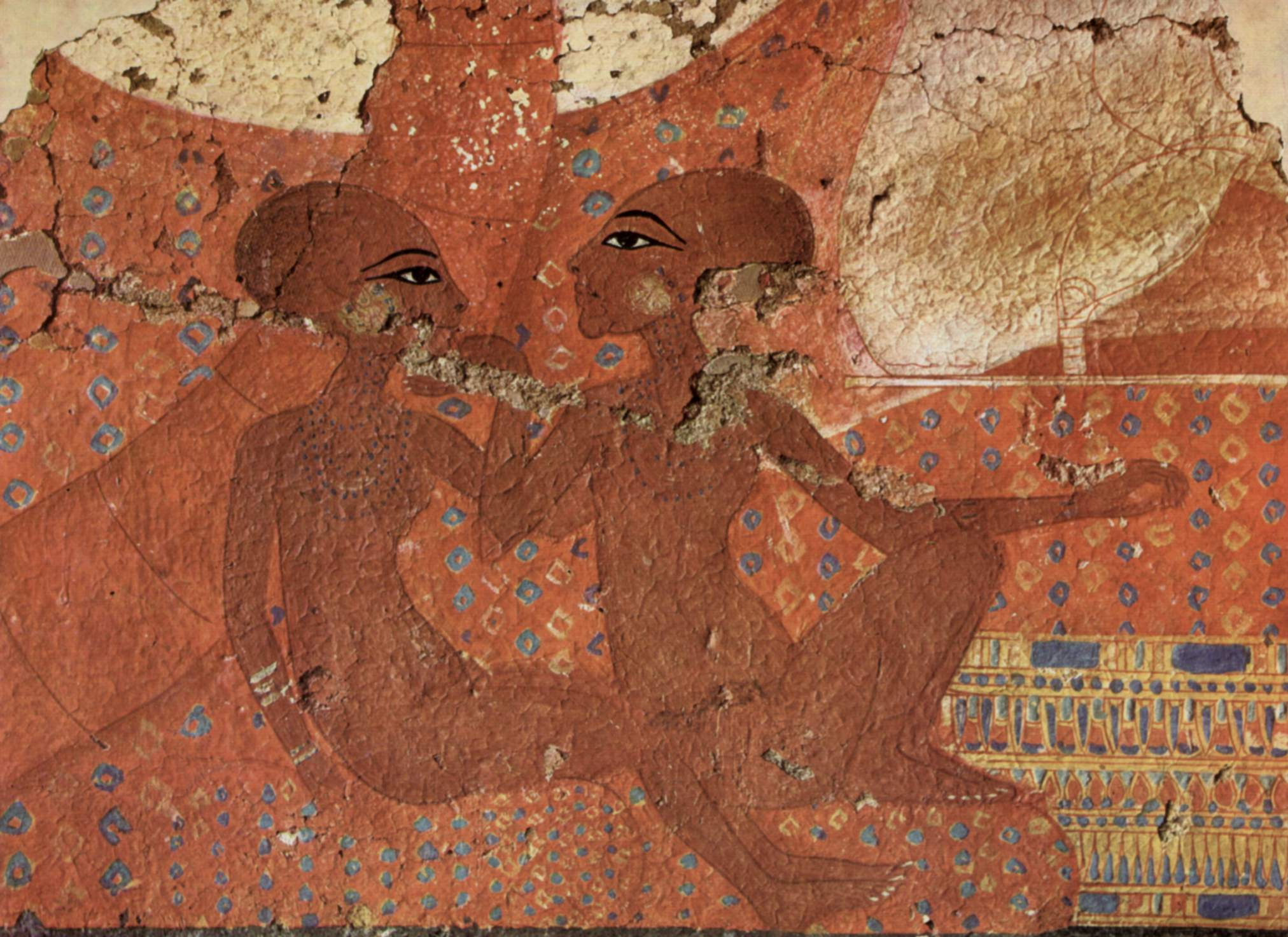
Two of Akhenaten's daughters, Nofernoferuaton and Nofernoferure, c. 1375–1358 BC. This comfortable and intimate family setting is repeated in other pieces of Amarna art

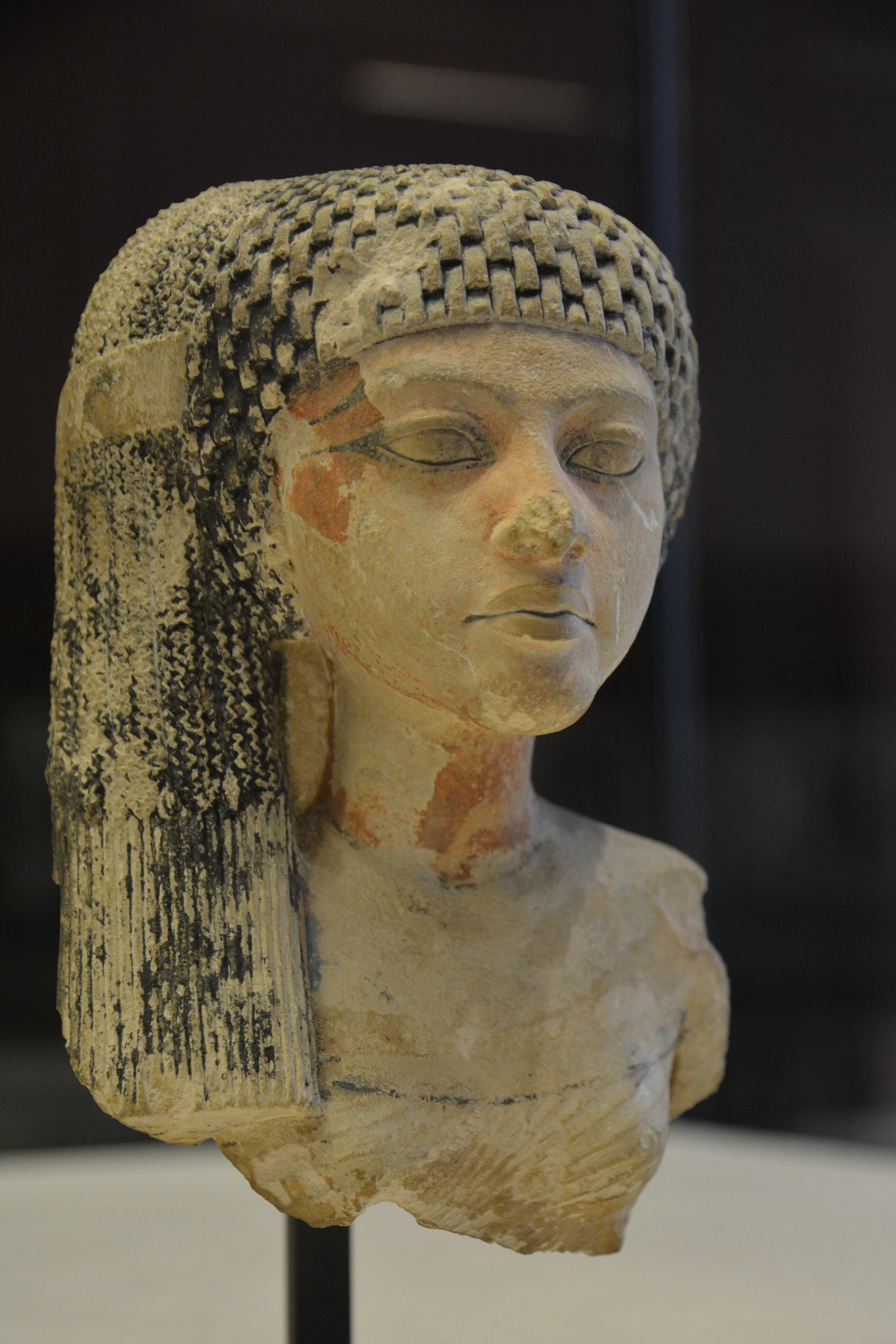
Princess of the Akhenaten family, Louvre

Amarna art, or the Amarna style, is a style adopted in the Amarna Period during and just after the reign of Akhenaten (r. 1351–1334 BC) in the late Eighteenth Dynasty, during the New Kingdom. Whereas ancient Egyptian art was famously slow to change, the Amarna style was a significant and sudden break from its predecessors both in the style of depictions, especially of people, and the subject matter. The artistic shift appears to be related to the king's religious reforms centering on the monotheistic or monolatric worship of the Aten, the disc of the Sun, as giver of life.

Like Akhenaten's religious reforms, his preferred art style was abandoned after the end of his reign. By the reign of Tutankhamun, both the pre-Amarna religion and art style had been restored.

== Background and history ==
Shortly after taking the throne, Amenhotep IV adopted a policy of religious reform centering on the Aten. While it is not clear if he held that the Aten was the only god (monotheism), he clearly regarded it as the only deity worthy of his worship (monolatry). To pay homage to his chosen god, Amenhotep IV changed his name to Akhenaten.

Throughout his rule, Akhenaten tried to change many aspects of Egyptian culture to celebrate or praise his god. He moved the royal capital to the city now known as Amarna and erected a number of palaces and temples there. He also extended his reforms to the style and usage of art.

The end of the Amarna period is unclear, as records from the time are sparse. However, it is clear that around the beginning of the reign of Tutankhamun, about four years after Akhenaten's death, conservative forces led by the temple priests reimposed the old religion. The new capital was abandoned, and traces of his monuments elsewhere defaced. Remains of Amarna art are therefore concentrated in Amarna itself, with other remains at Karnak, where large reliefs in the style were dismantled, and the blocks turned round to face inwards when a later building was constructed using them. These were only rediscovered in recent decades.

== General characteristics ==
Amarna art is characterized by a sense of movement and activity in images, with figures having raised heads, many figures overlapping and many scenes busy and crowded. The human body is portrayed differently; figures, always shown in profile on reliefs, are slender, swaying, with exaggerated extremities. In particular, depictions of Akhenaten give him distinctly feminine qualities such as large hips, prominent breasts, and a larger stomach and thighs. Other pieces, such as the most famous of all Amarna works, the Nefertiti Bust in Berlin, show much less pronounced features of the style.

The illustration of figures' hands and feet are apparently important. Fingers and toes are depicted as long and slender and are carefully detailed to show nails. Artists also showed subjects with elongated facial structures accompanied by folds within the skin as well as lowered eyelids. The figure was also illustrated with a more elongated body than the previous representation. In the new human form, the subject had more fat in the stomach, thigh, and breast region, while the torso, arm, and legs were thin and long like the rest of the body. The skin color of both male and female is generally dark brown (contrasted with the usual dark brown or red for males and light brown or white for females). Figures in this style are shown with both a left and a right foot, contrasting the traditional style of being shown with either two left or two right feet.

== Art in the style ==
=== Tombs ===
The decoration of the tombs of non-royals is quite different from previous eras. These tombs do not feature any funerary or agricultural scenes, nor do they include the tomb occupant unless he or she is depicted with a member of the royal family. There is an absence of gods and goddesses, apart from the Aten, the sundisc. However, the Aten does not shine its rays on the tomb owner, only on members of the royal family. There is neither a mention of Osiris nor other funerary figures. There is also no mention of a journey through the underworld. Instead, excerpts from the Hymn to the Aten are generally present.

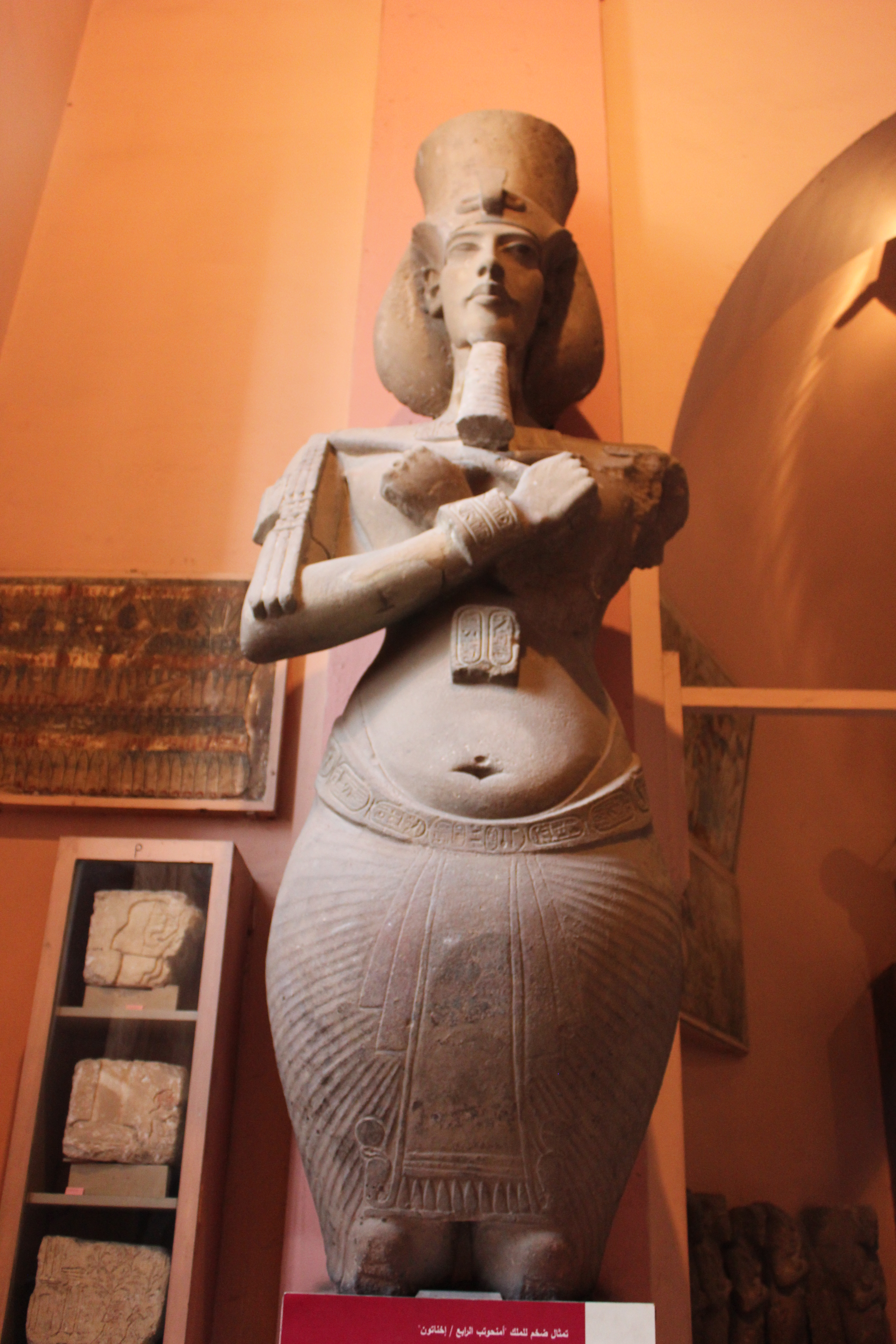
Akhenaten, Pharaoh of Egypt. Egyptian Museum, Cairo.

=== Sculpture ===
Sculptures from the Amarna period are set apart from other periods of Egyptian art. One reason for this is the accentuation of certain features. For instance, the portrayals feature an elongation and narrowing of the neck and head, sloping of the forehead and nose, a prominent chin, large ears and lips, spindle-like arms and calves, and large thighs, stomachs and hips.

In a relief of Akhenaten, he is portrayed in an intimate setting with his primary wife, Nefertiti, and their children, the six princesses. His children appear to be fully grown, only shrunken to appear smaller than their parents, a routine stylistic feature of traditional Egyptian art. They also have elongated necks and bodies. An unfinished head of a princess from this time, visible in the Tutankhamun and the Golden Age of the Pharaohs exhibition, displays a very prominent elongation to the back of the head.

The unusual, elongated skull shape often used in portrayal of the royal family "may be a slightly exaggerated treatment of a hereditary trait of the Amarna royal family", according to the Brooklyn Museum, given that "the mummy of Tutankhamun, presumed to be related to Akhenaten, has a similarly shaped skull, although not so elongated as [in typical Amarna-style art]". However, it is possible that the style is purely ritualistic.

The hands at the end of each ray extending from Aten in the relief are delivering the ankh, which symbolized "life" in the Egyptian culture, to Akhenaten and Nefertiti, and often also reach the portrayed princesses. The importance of the Sun God Aten is central to much of the Amarna period art, largely because Akhenaten's rule was marked by the monotheistic following of Aten.

In several sculptures of Akhenaten, if not most, he has wide hips and a visible paunch. His lips are thick, and his arms and legs are thin and lack muscular tone, unlike his counterparts of other eras in Egyptian artwork. Some scholars suggest that the presentation of the human body as imperfect during the Amarna period is in deference to Aten. Others think Akhenaten suffered from a genetic disorder, most likely the product of inbreeding, that caused him to look that way. Others interpret this unprecedented stylistic break from Egyptian tradition to be a reflection of the Amarna Royals' attempts to wrest political power from the traditional priesthood and bureaucratic authorities.

Much of the finest work, including the famous Nefertiti Bust in Berlin, was found in the studio of the second and last Royal Court Sculptor Thutmose, and is now in Berlin and Cairo, with some in the Metropolitan Museum of Art, New York.

The period saw the use of sunk relief, previously used for large external reliefs, extended to small carvings, and used for most monumental reliefs. Sunk relief appears best in strong sunlight. This was one innovation that had a lasting effect, as raised relief is rare in later periods.

=== Architecture ===
Not many buildings from this period have survived the ravages of later kings, partially as they were constructed out of standard size blocks, known as talatat, which were very easy to remove and reuse. In recent decades, re-building work on later buildings has revealed large number of reused blocks from the period, with the original carved faces turned inwards, greatly increasing the amount of work known from the period.

Temples in Amarna did not follow the traditional Egyptian design. They were smaller, with sanctuaries open to the sun, containing large numbers of altars. They had no closing doors. See Great Temple of the Aten, Small Temple of the Aten and the Temple of Amenhotep IV.

== Gallery ==
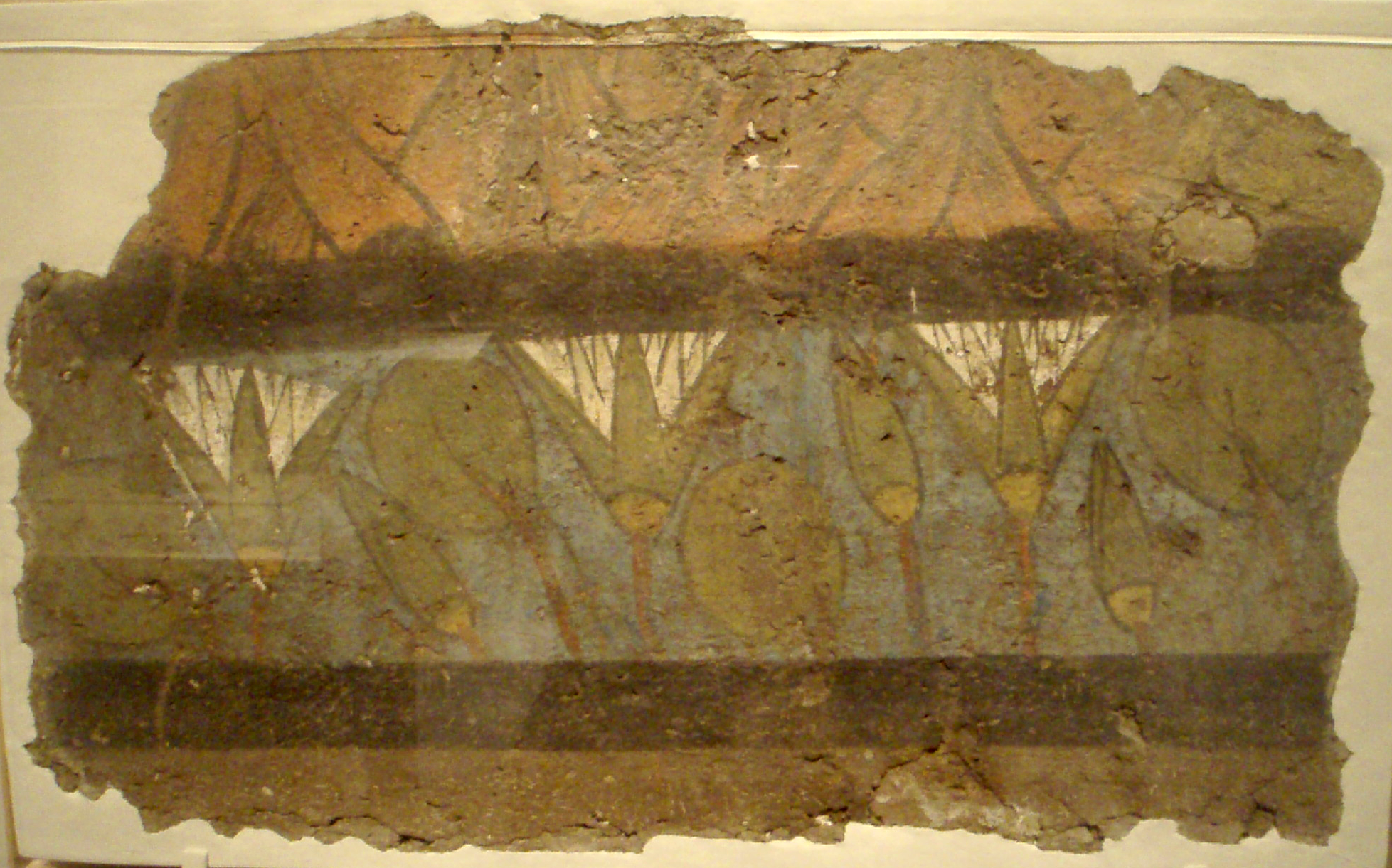
Painting from the reign of Akhenaten (circa 1352-1336 B.C.) depicting lotus buds and flowers. Originally from the "Women's Quarters of the North Palace" at el Amarna excavated in 1926-27. Now in the Brooklyn Museum,

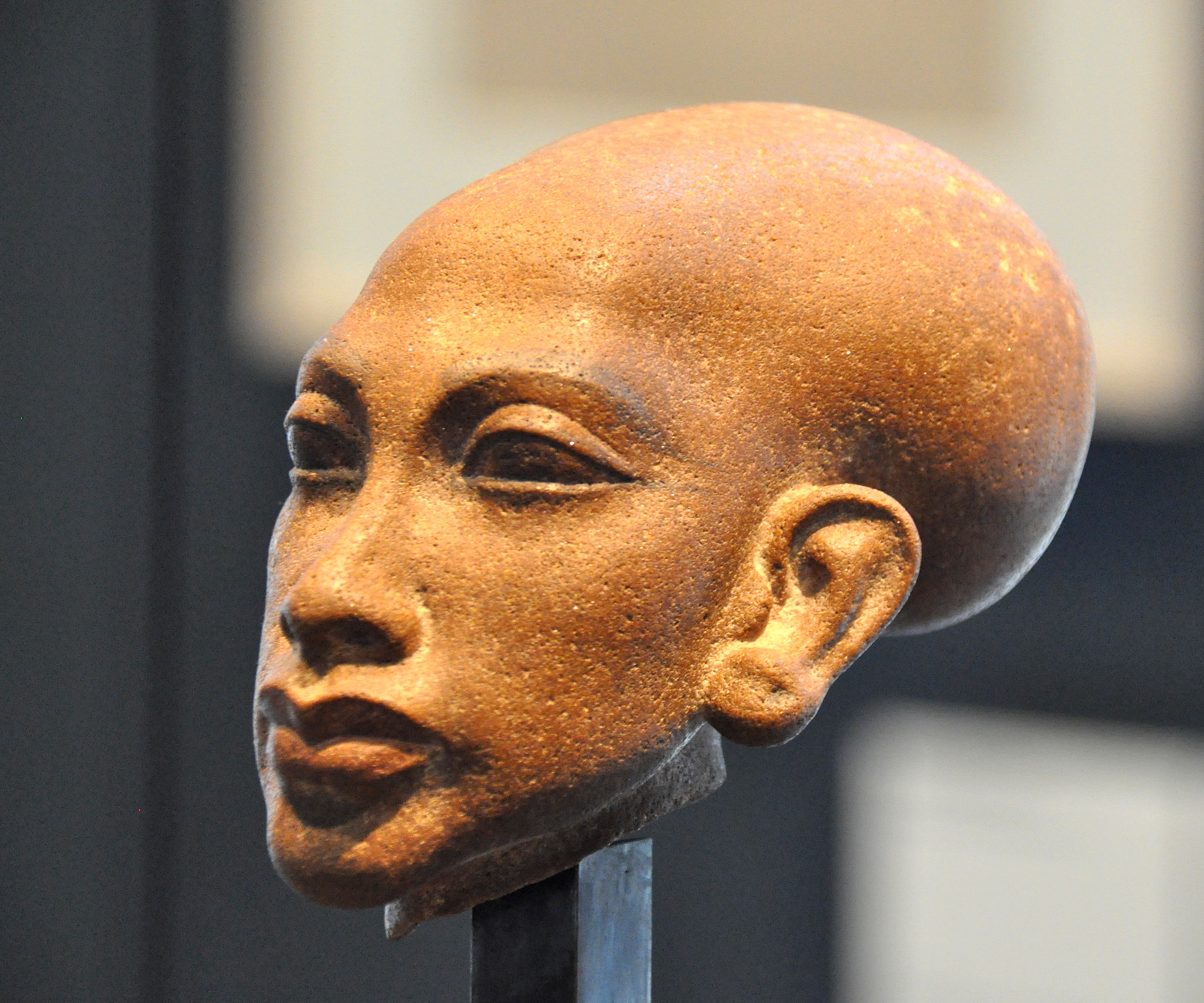
Head of a daughter of Akhenaten. 18th Dynasty, c. 1345 BC. State Museum of Egyptian Art, Munich

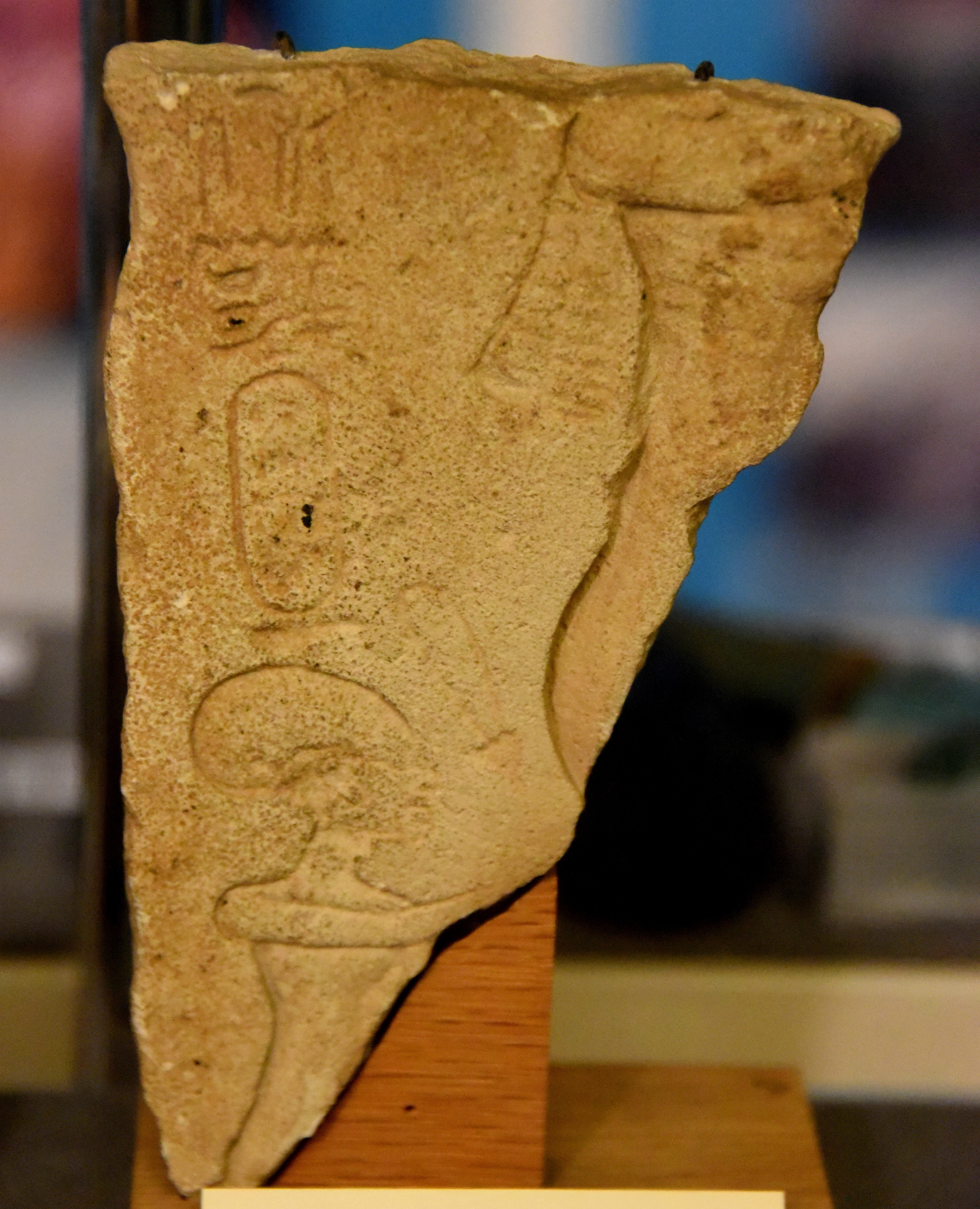
Limestone relief fragment. A princess holding a sistrum behind Nefertiti, who is partially seen. Reign of Akhenaten, Amarna. Petrie Museum of Egyptian Archaeology

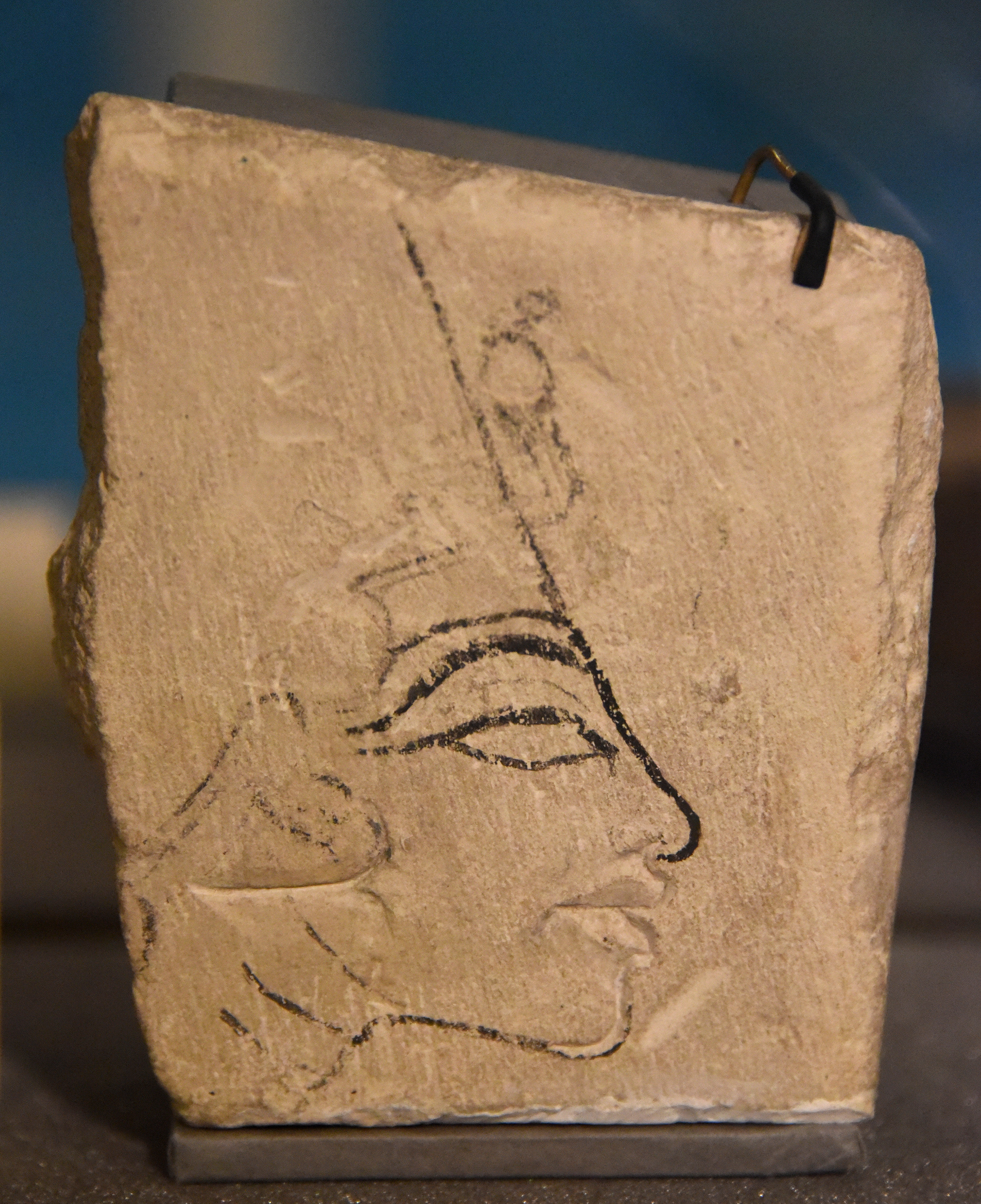
Limestone trial piece showing head of Nefertiti. Mainly in ink, but the lips were cut out. Reign of Akhenaten, Amarna. Petrie Museum

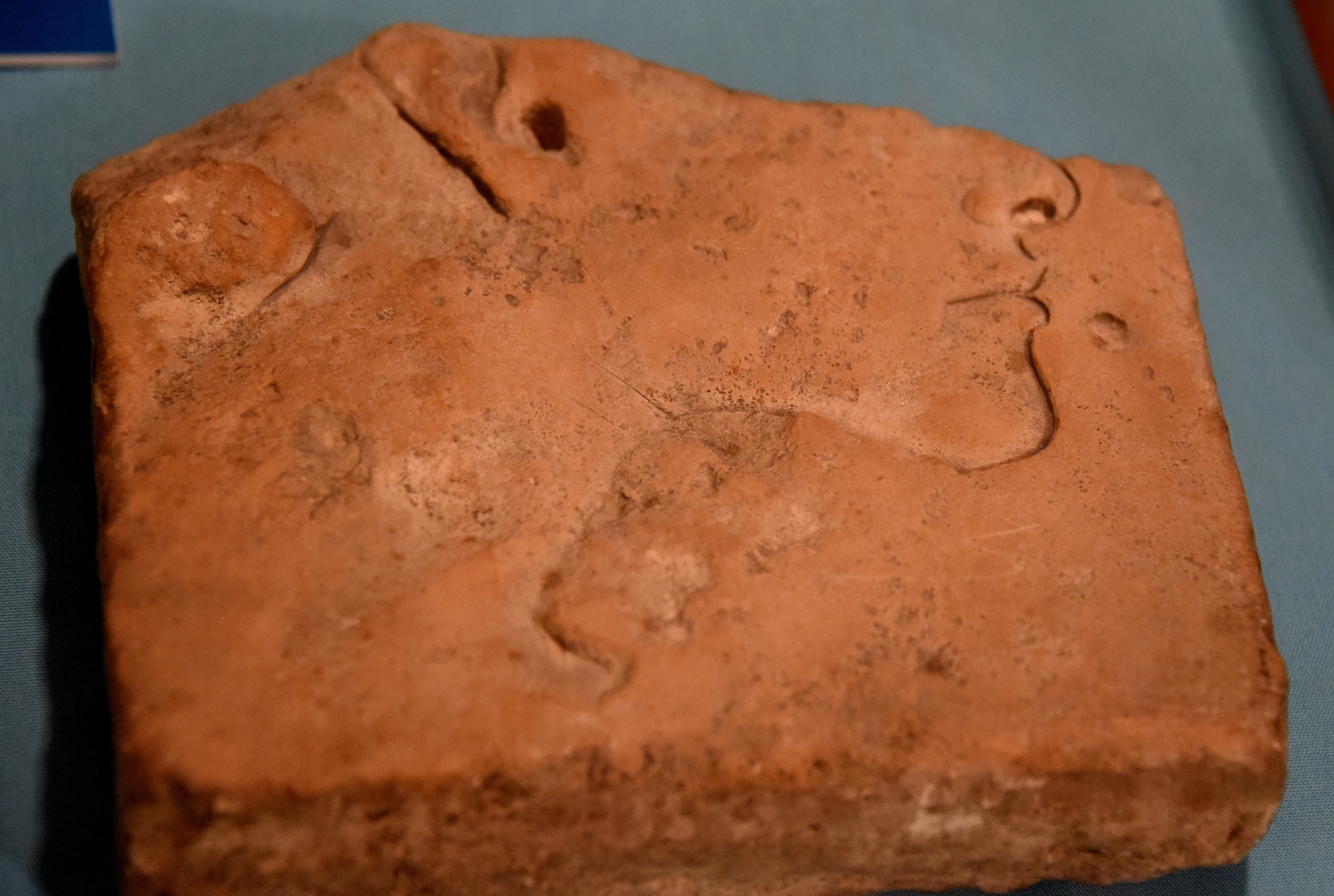
Limestone trial piece showing the distinctive Amarna-style elongation of Akhenaten's face. Shallow sunk relief. Petrie Museum

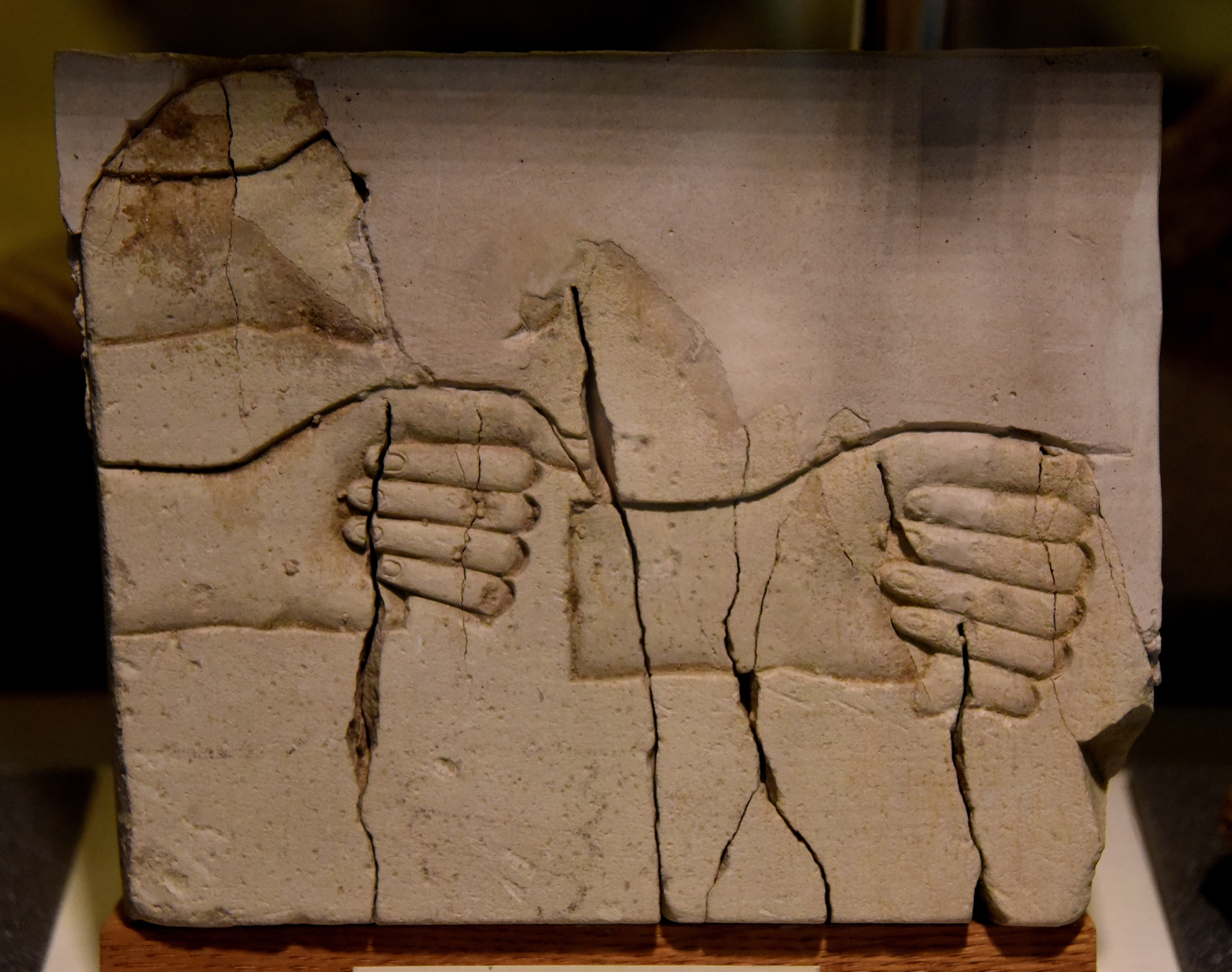
Limestone trial piece of hands. Amarna, Reign of Akhenaten, late 18th Dynasty. Petrie Museum

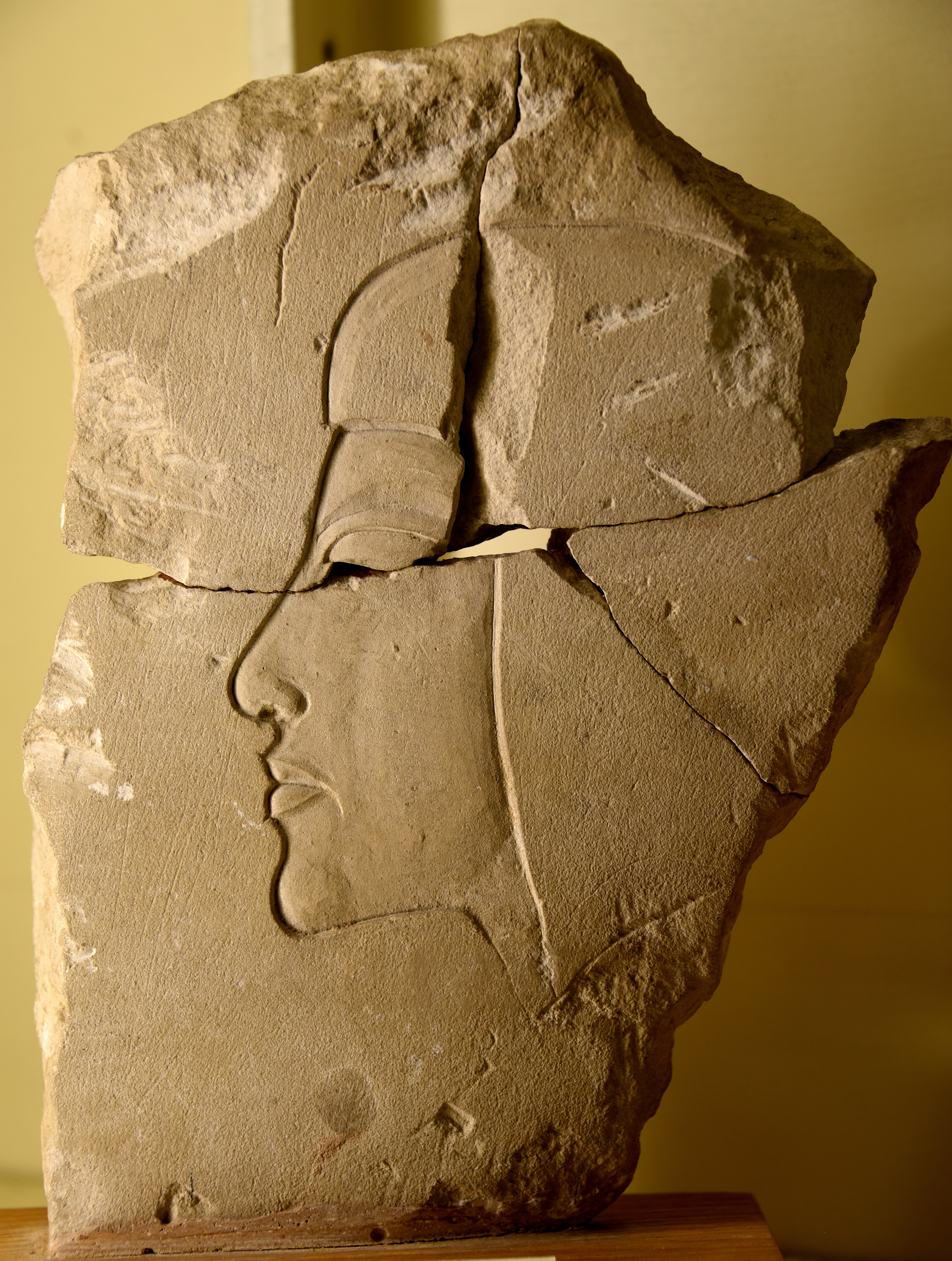
Limestone trial piece of a private person. Head of a princess on the reverse. Reign of Akhenaten, Amarna. Petrie Museum

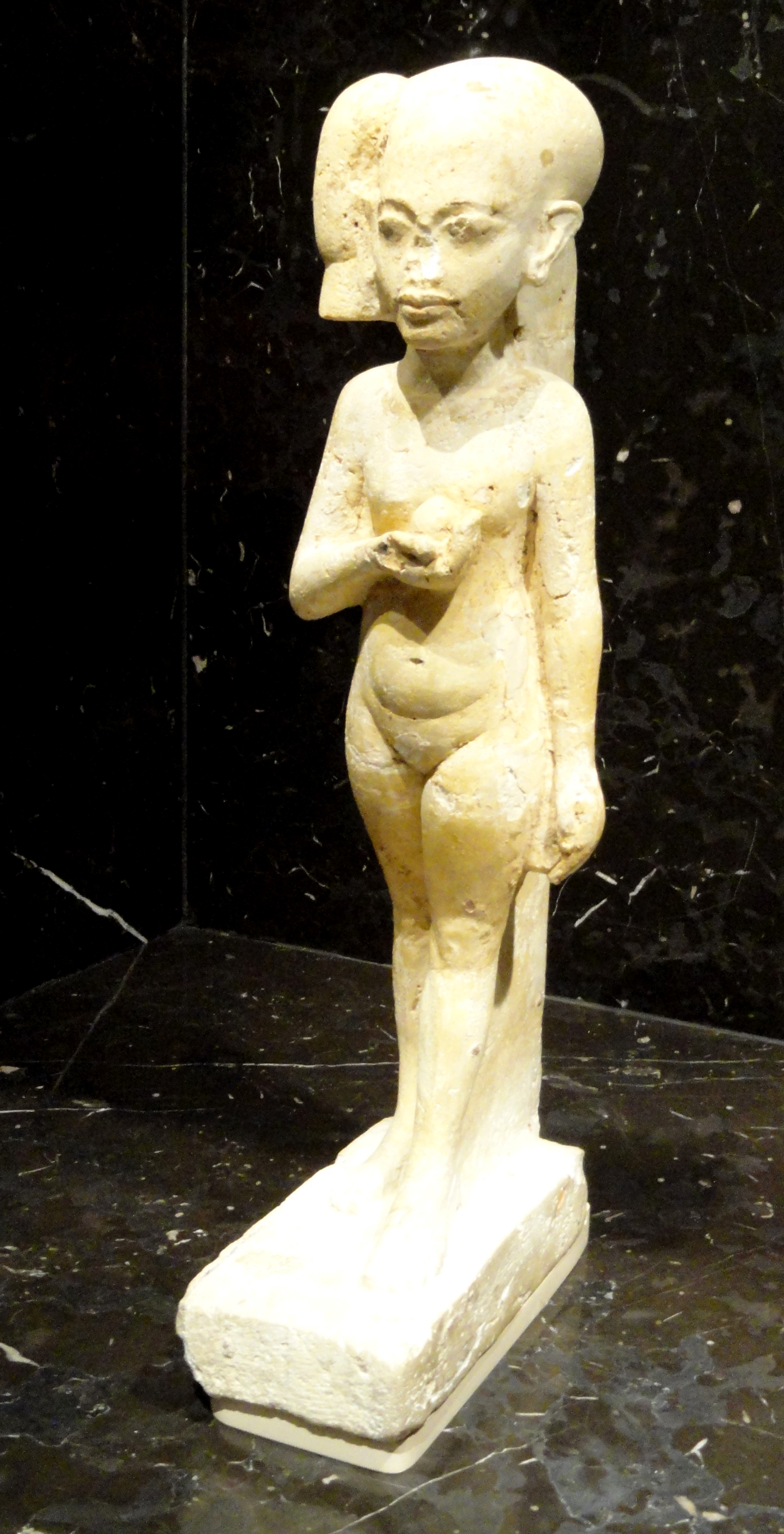
Princess, Amarna

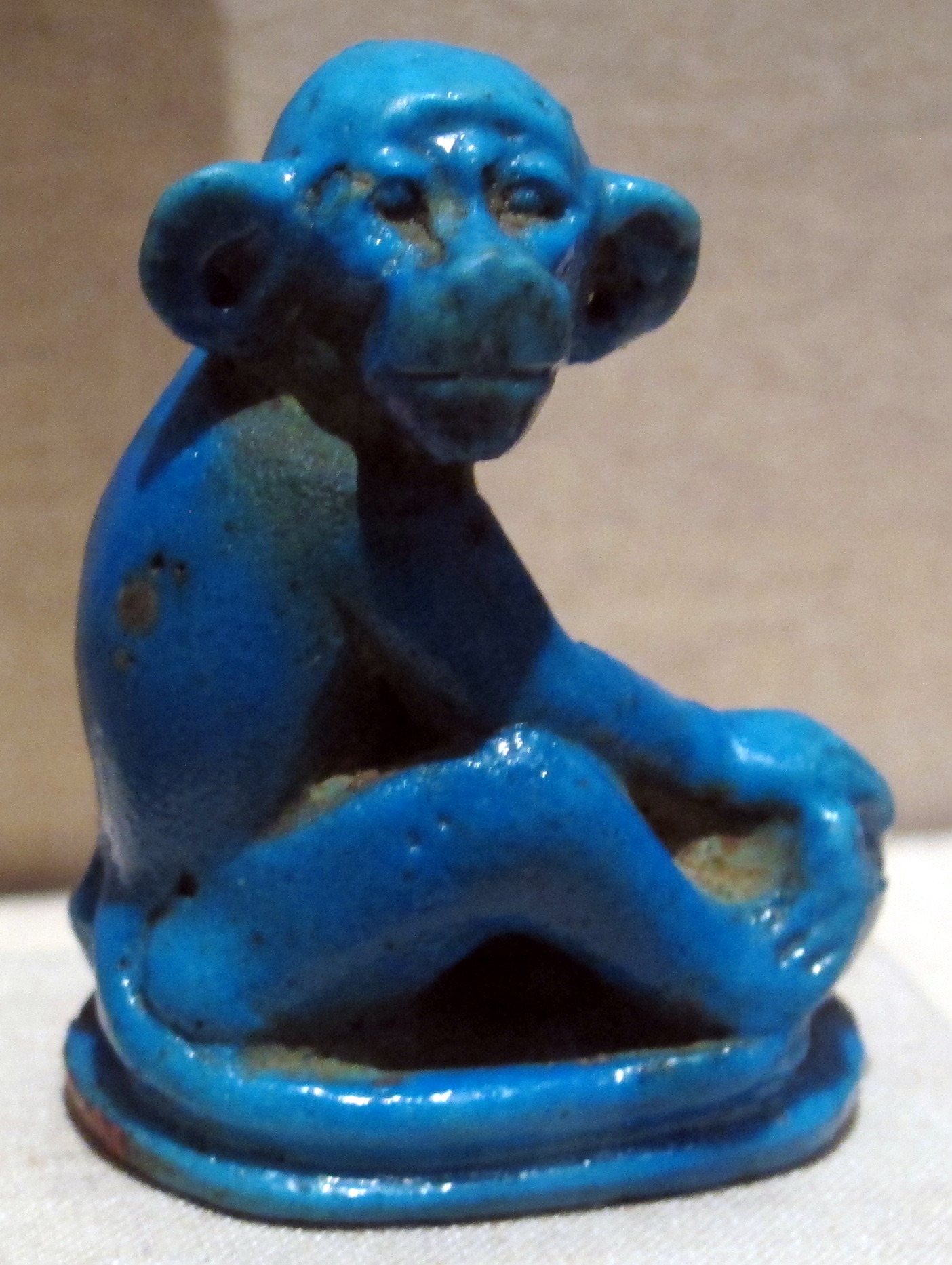
Amarna monkey. Blue faience from Brooklyn Museum

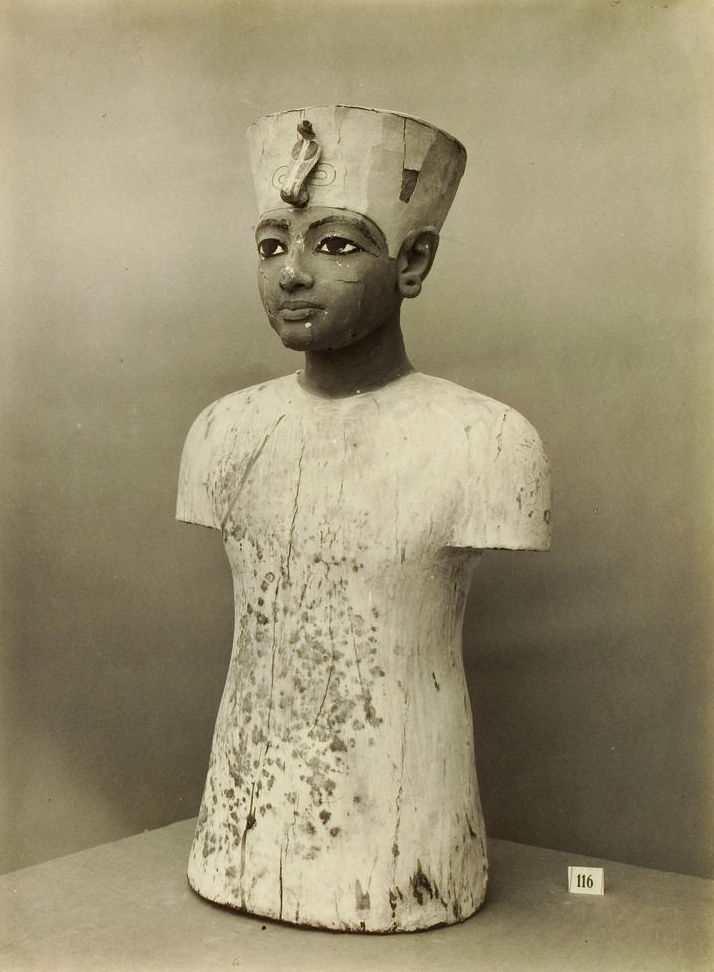
A painted, wooden figure of Tutankhamun found in his royal tomb

== See also ==
- Art of ancient Egypt
- Amarna letters
