= Lord William Lennox =

British soldier and writer

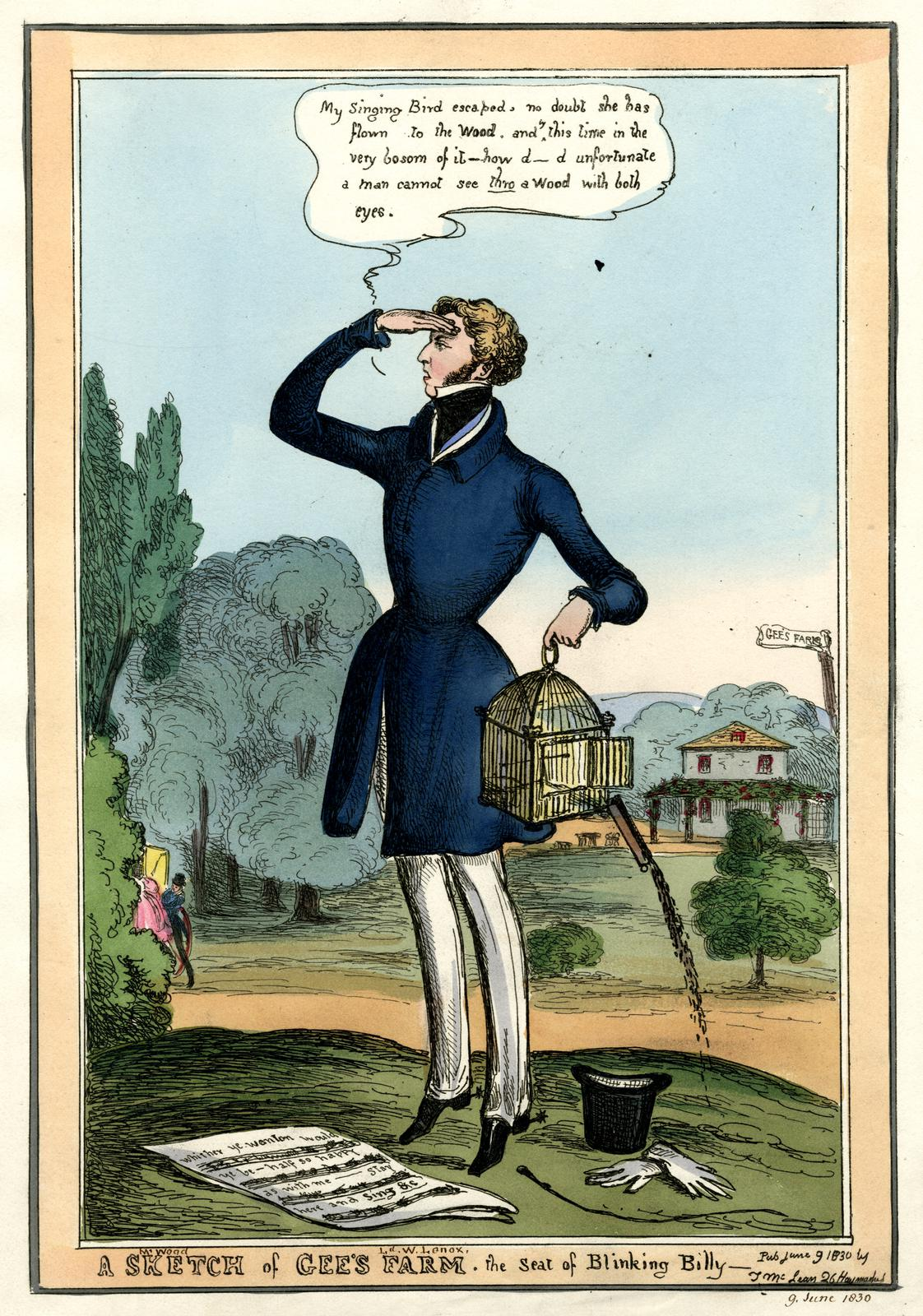
- Satirical print of William Lennox in A sketch of Gee's farm, the seat of blinking Billy, print made by William Heath (published by Thomas McLean, 1830)

Member of Parliament for King's Lynn
- In office 1831–1835

Personal details
- Born: 20 September 1799 Winestead, East Yorkshire, England
- Died: 18 February 1881 (aged 81) London, England
- Spouse(s): Mary Ann Paton (m. 1824; div. 1831) Ellen Smith (m. 1854; died 1859) Maria Molyneux (m. 1863)
- Parents: Charles Lennox, 4th Duke of Richmond (father); Lady Charlotte Gordon (mother)
- Relatives: Charles Gordon-Lennox, 5th Duke of Richmond (brother); Lord George Lennox (brother); Lord Sussex Lennox (brother); Lord Arthur Lennox (brother)
- Military career
- Rank: Captain
- Unit: Royal Horse Guard

Lord William Pitt Lennox (20 September 1799 – 18 February 1881) was a British Army officer and writer.

== Biography ==
Lennox, fourth son of Charles Lennox, 4th Duke of Richmond, and the former Lady Charlotte Gordon, was born at Winestead Hall, Yorkshire, 20 September 1799, and was a godson of William Pitt and a cousin of Charles James Fox. He was educated at Westminster School from 1808 to 1814.

On 13 May 1813, while still at school, he was gazetted to a cornetcy in the Royal Horse Guards, and on 8 August 1814 accompanied the Duke of Wellington as an attaché in his embassy to Paris. In 1815 he was attached to General Sir Peregrine Maitland's staff, was present at his mother's memorable ball in Brussels, and saw some portion of the battle of Waterloo, but was prevented by the effects of a horse accident, which cost him the sight of one eye, from taking an active part in it. For three years after Waterloo he acted as an aide-de-camp to Wellington. He then joined his regiment in England, was promoted to be a captain 28 March 1822, and retired by the sale of his commission 25 March 1829. He was an extra aide-de-camp to his father while he was governor-general of Canada, 1818–1819, and was one of the pages at the coronation of George IV, 19 July 1821.

He represented King's Lynn, Norfolk, in conjunction with Lord George Bentinck, as a moderate reformer and a supporter of the government from 10 December 1832 to 29 December 1834, and spoke on the Reform Bill, on fees paid on vessels in quarantine, and on the Anatomy Bill.

On 5 July 1836 he was riding in London's Hyde Park together with the singer Maria Malibran when she fell from her horse.

Lennox however was more interested in sport and literature, and preferred a life of gaiety and leisure. He was devoted to horse-racing, delighted in private theatricals, and once ran a hundred yards race in Hill Street, Berkeley Square, at midnight. He figured in Benjamin Disraeli's Vivian Grey as Lord Prima Donna (1827). He contributed to the annuals during their popularity, and to Once a Week and those serials which dealt with military and sporting topics. Memoirs of Madame Malibran, by Lady Merlin, 2 vols. 1840, was based on a manuscript by Lennox. In 1858 he edited the Review newspaper.

He wrote several feeble novels, which had a brief success; but his volumes of personal recollections contain interesting anecdotes about court and other celebrities. In later life, when he was far from rich, he often acted as a paid lecturer, and regularly contributed to the Court Journal. He died at 34 Hans Place, Sloane Street, London, 18 February 1881, and was buried in Brompton Cemetery on 25 February.

== Family ==
Lennox was married three times:

1. 7 May 1824, to Mary Ann Paton (October 1802 – 21 July 1864), eldest daughter of George Paton, by whom he had an unnamed daughter; this marriage was dissolved by the Scottish courts in 1831
2. 1854, to Ellen Smith (d. 3 November 1859), daughter of John Smith, by whom he had a son, William Robert Lennox (1855–1907)
3. 17 November 1863, to Maria Jane Molyneux (30 April 1833 – 10 January 1916), eldest daughter of the Revd Capel Molyneux

== Chief works ==
1. Compton Audley, or Hands not Hearts, 1841, 3 vols.
2. Tuft Hunter, 1843, 3 vols.
3. Percy Hamilton, or the Adventures of a Westminster Boy, 1851, 3 vols.
4. Three Years with the Duke of Wellington in Private Life, 1853.
5. Philip Courtenay, or Scenes at Home and Abroad, 1855, 3 vols.
6. The Story of my Life, 1857, 3 vols.
7. The Victoria Cross, the Rewarded and their Services, 1857.
8. Merrie England, its Sports and Pastimes, 1858.
9. Pictures of Sporting Life and Character, 1860, 2 vols.
10. Recollections of a Sportsman, 1862, 2 vols.
11. Life of the Fifth Duke of Richmond, anon., 1862.
12. Fifty Years' Biographical Reminiscences, 1863, 2 vols.
13. The Adventures of a Man of Family, 1864, 3 vols.
14. Drafts on my Memory, 1866, 2 vols.
15. Sport at Home and Abroad, 1872, 2 vols.
16. My Recollections, 1874, 2 vols.
17. Celebrities I have known, 1876–7, 4 vols.
18. Coaching, with Anecdotes of the Road, 1876.
19. Fashion then and now, 1878, 2 vols.
20. Lord of Himself, 1880, 3 vols.
21. Plays, Players, and Playhouses at Home and Abroad, 1881, 2 vols.

== Notes ==
Parliament of the United Kingdom
Preceded by Lord George Bentinck; John Walpole	Member of Parliament for King's Lynn; 1831 – 1835; With: Lord George Bentinck	Succeeded by Lord George Bentinck; Sir Stratford Canning
