= Lord Arthur Lennox =

British Army officer and politician (1806–64)

The Right Honourable Lord Arthur Lennox
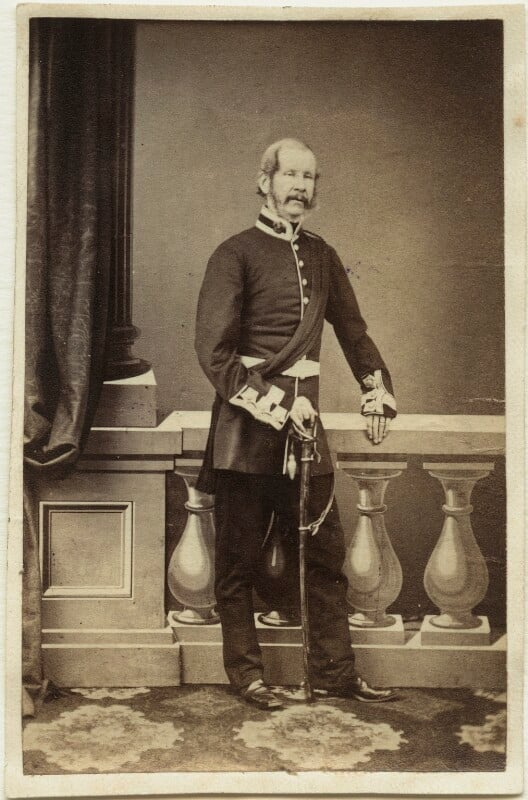
- Lennox in the 1860s

Member of Parliament for Great Yarmouth
- In office 1847–1848 Serving with Octavius Coope
- Preceded by: Charles Rumbold; William Wilshere
- Succeeded by: Joseph Sandars; Charles Rumbold

Member of Parliament for Chichester
- In office 1831–1846 Serving with John Abel Smith
- Preceded by: John Smith; Lord John Lennox
- Succeeded by: John Abel Smith; Lord Henry Lennox

Personal details
- Born: 2 October 1806
- Died: 15 January 1864 (aged 57) Ovington Square, London
- Spouse: Adelaide Constance Campbell (after 1835)
- Children: 4
- Parent(s): Charles Lennox, 4th Duke of Richmond; Lady Charlotte Gordon

Military service
- Branch/service: Royal Sussex Light Infantry Militia
- Rank: Lieutenant-colonel

Lord Arthur Lennox (2 October 1806 – 15 January 1864) was a British politician. He was the youngest son of the 4th Duke of Richmond.

== Early life ==
Lennox was born on 2 October 1806 as the seventh and youngest son of fourteen children born to Lady Charlotte Gordon and Charles Lennox, 4th Duke of Richmond, the Governor General of British North America and Lord Lieutenant of Ireland. In 1836, his mother inherited the vast Gordon estates on the death of her brother, George Gordon, 5th Duke of Gordon. Among his siblings were Charles Gordon-Lennox, 5th Duke of Richmond, Lord John Lennox, Lord William Lennox, and Lord Sussex Lennox.

His paternal grandparents were General Lord George Lennox (the younger son of the 2nd Duke of Richmond) and Lady Louisa Kerr (a daughter of the 4th Marquess of Lothian). Among his extended family was nephew, Lord Henry Lennox, who succeeded him as MP for Chichester in 1846. His mother was the eldest child of Alexander Gordon, 4th Duke of Gordon, and Jane Maxwell (a daughter of Sir William Maxwell, 3rd Baronet).

== Career ==
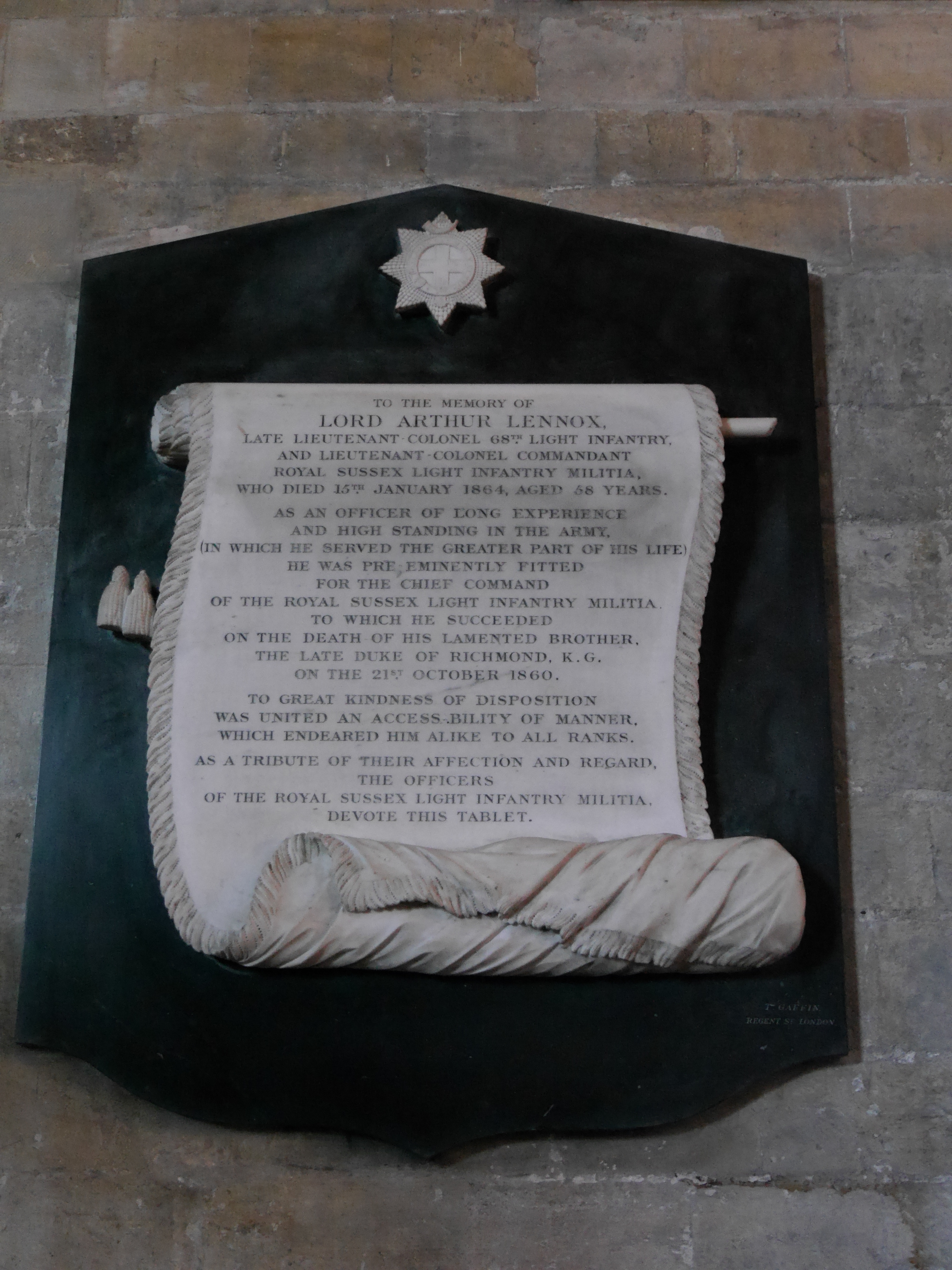
Mural monument to Lord Arthur Lennox, Chichester Cathedral

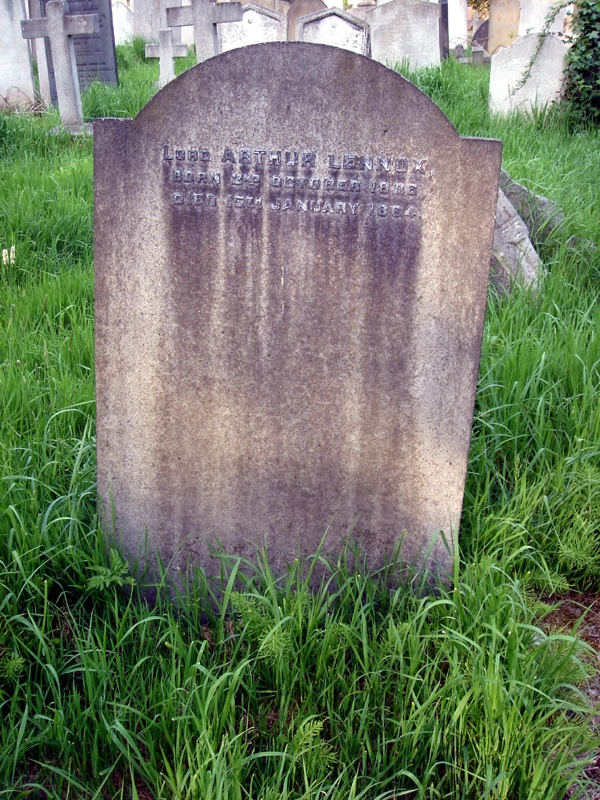
Tombstone of Lord Arthur Lennox, Brompton Cemetery, London

Upon his elder brother, the 5th Duke of Richmond, joining Lord Grey's ministry in 1831, Lennox was returned for Chichester in 1831. He eventually succeeded John Young as a Junior Lord of the Treasury in Peel's second ministry, but he was obliged to resign his seat in 1846 owing to his support for repeal of the Corn Laws and was succeeded in the treasury by William Cripps. He was elected in 1847 for Great Yarmouth, but was unseated the following year for bribery.

=== Military career ===
Lennox was commissioned as an Ensign into the 71st Foot in 1823. He was promoted lieutenant in 1825, captain (half-pay) in 1826, major in 1838 and lieutenant-colonel in 1842. He transferred to the 72nd Foot in 1843, to the 6th Foot in 1845, and to the 68th Foot in 1852 before retiring in 1854. He was made Lieutenant-colonel of the Royal Sussex Light Infantry Militia in 1854 and Lieutenant-colonel-commandant in 1860.

He served as Clerk of the Ordnance, replacing Henry George Boldero in 1845. In 1846, he was replaced by George Anson.

== Personal life ==
On 1 July 1835 he married Adelaide Constance Campbell, daughter of Col. John Campbell of Shawfield and the writer Lady Charlotte Bury (the youngest child of the 5th Duke of Argyll, and the former Elizabeth Gunning). Among her siblings were Walter Frederick Campbell (MP for Argyllshire), Eliza Maria (wife of Sir William Gordon-Cumming, 2nd Baronet) Eleanora (wife of Henry Paget, 2nd Marquess of Anglesey), and Harriet Charlotte Beaujolois (wife of Charles Bury, 2nd Earl of Charleville). Together, they were the parents of three daughters and one son:

- Constance Charlotte Elisa Lennox (1836–1925), who married Sir George Russell, 4th Baronet of Swallowfield Park, in 1871. They were the parents of Sir Arthur Russell, 6th Baronet, and the maternal grandparents of Aileen Plunket, Maureen Constance Guinness, and Oonagh Guinness.
- Ada Fanny Susan Lennox (1840–1881), who died unmarried.
- Arthur Charles Wriothesley Lennox (1842–1876), who died unmarried.
- Ethel Lennox (1844–1938), who died unmarried.

Lennox died at his residence, Ovington Square, Brompton, on 15 January 1864, and was buried in Brompton Cemetery, London. In his will, he left "the whole of his property, both real and personal" to his widow, who died on 14 August 1888 at their daughter's residence, Swallowfield Park.

=== Descendants ===
Through his daughter Constance, he was a grandfather of Marie Clothilde Russell (wife of the Hon. Ernest Guinness, second son of the 1st Earl of Iveagh), Sir George Russell, 5th Baronet, and mineralogist Sir Arthur Russell, 6th Baronet.

== Sources ==
- Lundy, Darryl (25 April 2011), Lady Charlotte Gordon, The Peerage, p. 1179 § 11783 Endnotes:
  - Mosley, Charles, ed. (2003), Burke's Peerage, Baronetage & Knightage, vol. 2 (107th 3 volumes ed.), Wilmington, Delaware, U.S.A.: Burke's Peerage (Genealogical Books), p. 2012
  - Mosley, Charles, ed. (2003a), Burke's Peerage, Baronetage & Knightage, vol. 3 (107th 3 volumes ed.), Wilmington, Delaware, U.S.A.: Burke's Peerage (Genealogical Books), pp. 3335, 3336
  - Naylor, George (1888), The Register's of Thorrington

Parliament of the United Kingdom
Preceded by John Smith; Lord John Lennox	Member of Parliament for Chichester; 1831–1846; With: John Abel Smith	Succeeded by John Abel Smith; Lord Henry Lennox
Preceded by Charles Rumbold; William Wilshere	Member of Parliament for Great Yarmouth; 1847–1848; With: Octavius Coope	Succeeded by Joseph Sandars; Charles Rumbold
Political offices
Preceded by John Young	Junior Lord of the Treasury; 1844–1845	Succeeded by William Cripps
Military offices
Preceded by Henry George Boldero	Clerk of the Ordnance; 1845–1846	Succeeded by George Anson
