= Charles Gordon-Lennox, 6th Duke of Richmond =

British politician (1818–1903)

His Grace The Duke of Richmond KG PC
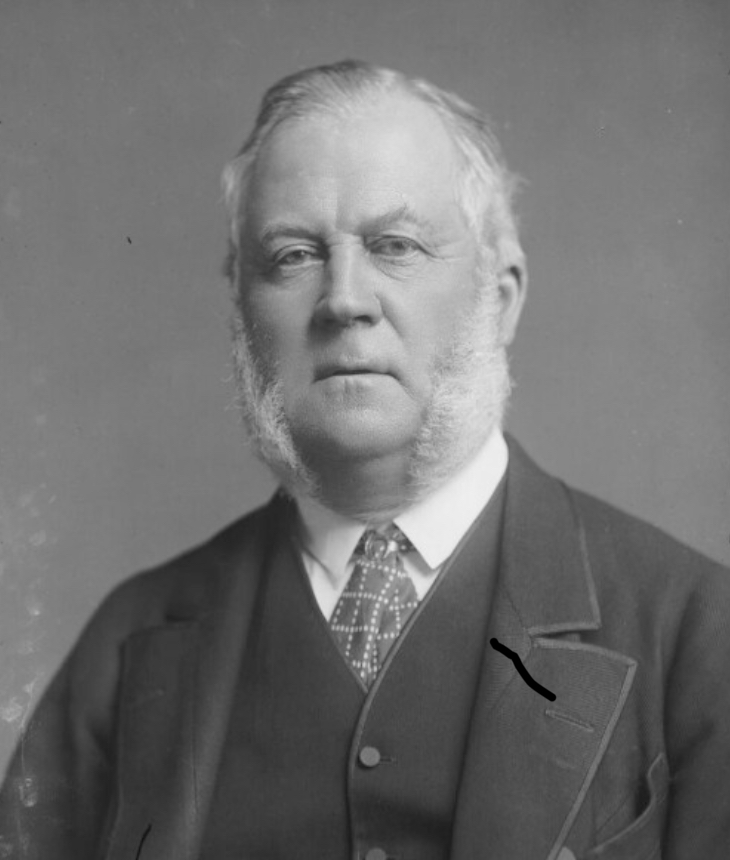
- The Duke of Richmond, 1883

President of the Board of Trade
- In office 24 June 1885 – 19 August 1885
- Monarch: Victoria
- Prime Minister: The Marquess of Salisbury
- Preceded by: Joseph Chamberlain
- Succeeded by: Hon. Edward Stanhope
- In office 8 March 1867 – 1 December 1868
- Monarch: Victoria
- Prime Minister: The Earl of Derby; Benjamin Disraeli
- Preceded by: Sir Stafford Northcote
- Succeeded by: John Bright

Leader of the House of Lords
- In office 21 February 1874 – 21 August 1876
- Monarch: Victoria
- Prime Minister: Benjamin Disraeli
- Preceded by: The Earl Granville
- Succeeded by: The Earl of Beaconsfield

Lord President of the Council
- In office 21 February 1874 – 28 April 1880
- Monarch: Victoria
- Prime Minister: Benjamin Disraeli
- Preceded by: The Lord Aberdare
- Succeeded by: The Earl Spencer

President of the Poor Law Board
- In office 7 March 1859 – 11 June 1859
- Monarch: Victoria
- Prime Minister: The Earl of Derby
- Preceded by: Thomas Sotheron-Estcourt
- Succeeded by: Charles Pelham Villiers

Member of the House of Lords
- Lord Temporal
- In office 22 October 1860 – 27 September 1903
- Preceded by: The 5th Duke of Richmond
- Succeeded by: The 7th Duke of Richmond

Member of Parliament for West Sussex
- In office 22 July 1841 – 21 October 1860
- Preceded by: Lord John Lennox
- Succeeded by: Sir Walter Barttelot

Personal details
- Born: Charles Henry Lennox; 27 February 1818 Richmond House, London
- Died: 27 September 1903 (aged 85) Gordon Castle, Morayshire
- Party: Conservative
- Spouse: Frances Harriett Greville (m. 1843; died 1887)
- Children: 6, including Charles and Walter
- Parent(s): Charles Lennox, 5th Duke of Richmond; Lady Caroline Paget
- Education: Christ Church, Oxford

Charles Henry Gordon-Lennox, 6th Duke of Richmond, 6th Duke of Lennox, 1st Duke of Gordon, KG, PC (27 February 1818 – 27 September 1903), styled Earl of March until 1860, was a British landowner and Conservative politician.

== Background and education ==
Born at Richmond House, London, he was the eldest son of Charles Lennox, 5th Duke of Richmond, and his wife Lady Caroline Paget, eldest daughter of Field Marshal Henry Paget, 1st Marquess of Anglesey.

He was educated at Westminster School before going up to Christ Church, Oxford, and played for Oxford University, being awarded Hon. DCL in 1870.

Commissioned into the Royal Horse Guards in 1839, he served as Aide-de-Camp to the Duke of Wellington from 1842 until 1854. Born with the surname Lennox, when his father inherited the Gordon estates from his uncle, the family took the additional surname Gordon-Lennox, by Royal Licence dated 9 August 1836.

Landowner of 286,000 acres mostly in Banff, Aberdeen and Inverness, in Sussex he owned 17,000 acres. By 1883, the Duke of Richmond had an income of £80,000 a year from his English and Scottish estates.

== Political career ==
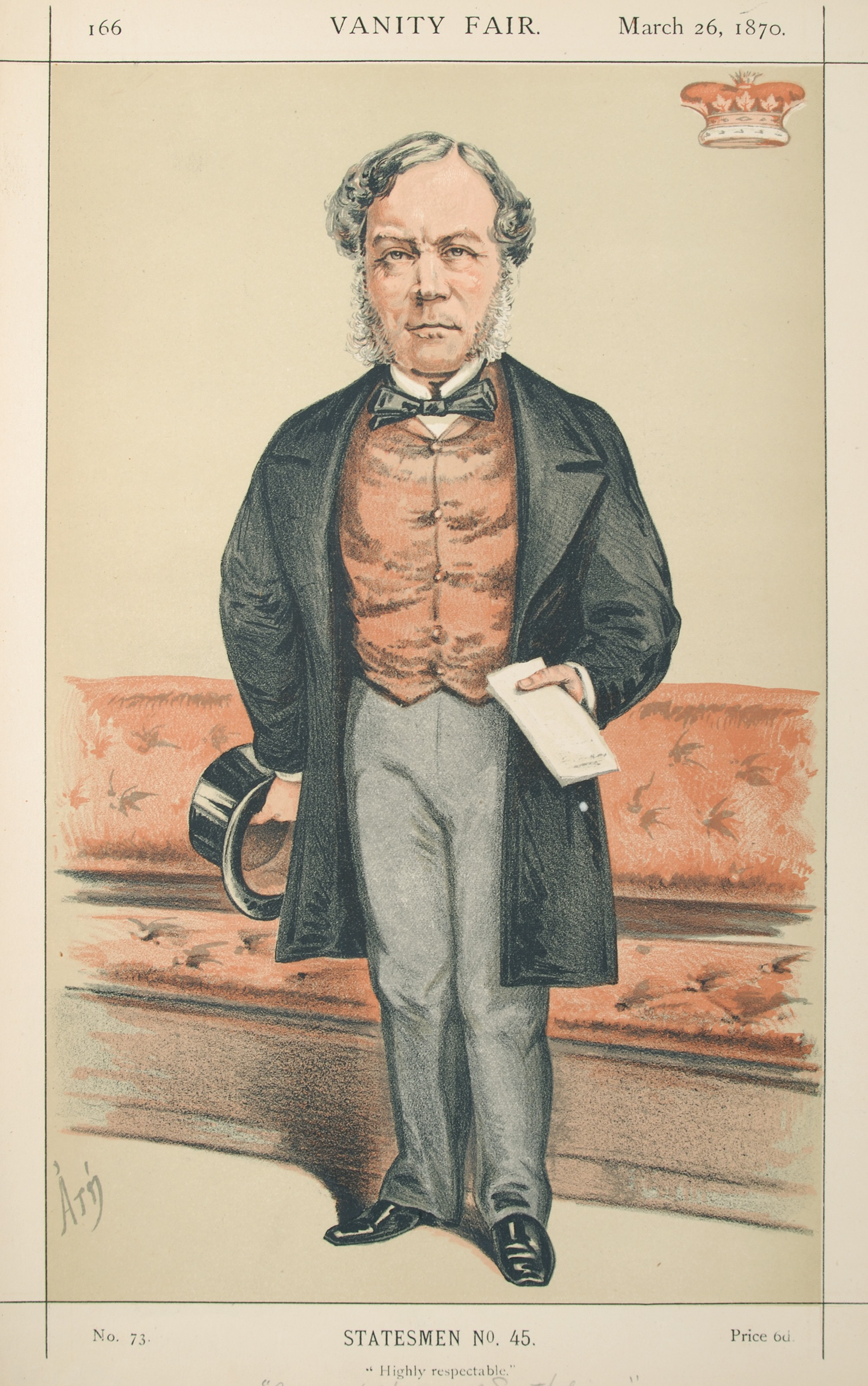
"Highly respectable". Vanity Fair caricature by ATn, 1870.

March entered politics as MP for West Sussex in 1841, and was sworn of the Privy Council in 1859. In 1860, he succeeded his father as Duke of Richmond, taking his seat in the House of Lords. He chaired the Royal Commission on Capital Punishment, which reported in 1866, and the Royal Commission on Water Supply in 1869, which reported overall planning of water supplies for domestic use had become necessary.

Invested as a Knight of the Garter in 1867, the Duke of Richmond served as a government minister in the Conservative administrations of Lord Derby, Disraeli and the Marquess of Salisbury. Recognised for his public service, in 1876, by being created Duke of Gordon and Earl of Kinrara in the Peerage of the United Kingdom, he was Chancellor of the University of Aberdeen from 1861 until his death at Gordon Castle in 1903.

Richmond served as Lord-Lieutenant of Banffshire and Chairman of West Sussex County Council, having (as Earl of March) been President of Marylebone Cricket Club in 1842 (like his father-in-law in 1828).

== Family ==
He married Frances Harriett Greville (1824–1887), daughter of Algernon Greville, on 28 November 1843. The Duke and Duchess had six children:

- Lady Caroline Gordon-Lennox (12 October 1844 – 2 November 1934), acted as châtelaine of Goodwood after her mother's death, and died unmarried;
- Charles Gordon-Lennox, 7th Duke of Richmond, Lennox and Gordon (1845 – 1928);
- Lord Algernon Charles Gordon-Lennox (19 September 1847 – 3 October 1921), married Blanche Maynard and had issue one daughter,
  - Ivy Gordon-Lennox (16 June 1887 – 3 March 1982), who married William Cavendish-Bentinck, 7th Duke of Portland;
- Captain Lord Francis Charles Gordon-Lennox (30 July 1849 – 1 January 1886), died unmarried;
- Lady Florence Gordon-Lennox (21 June 1851 – 21 July 1895), died unmarried;
- Lord Walter Charles Gordon-Lennox (29 July 1865 – 21 October 1922), married Alice Ogilvie-Grant, having issue.
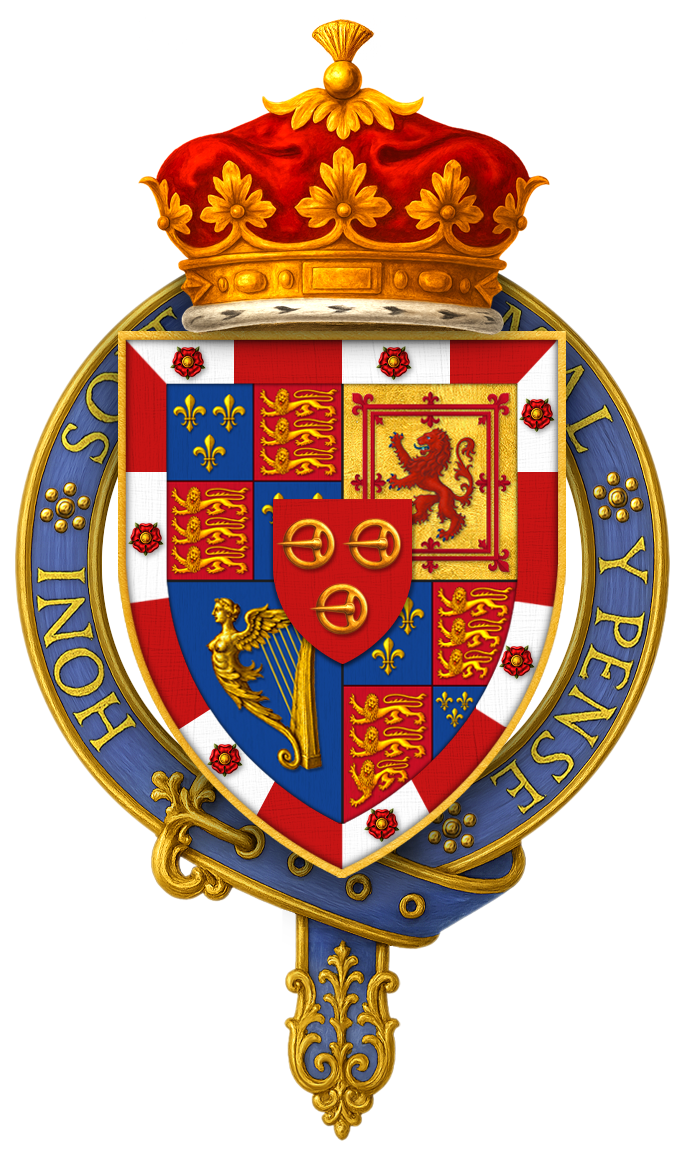
Garter stall plate of the
6th Duke of Richmond

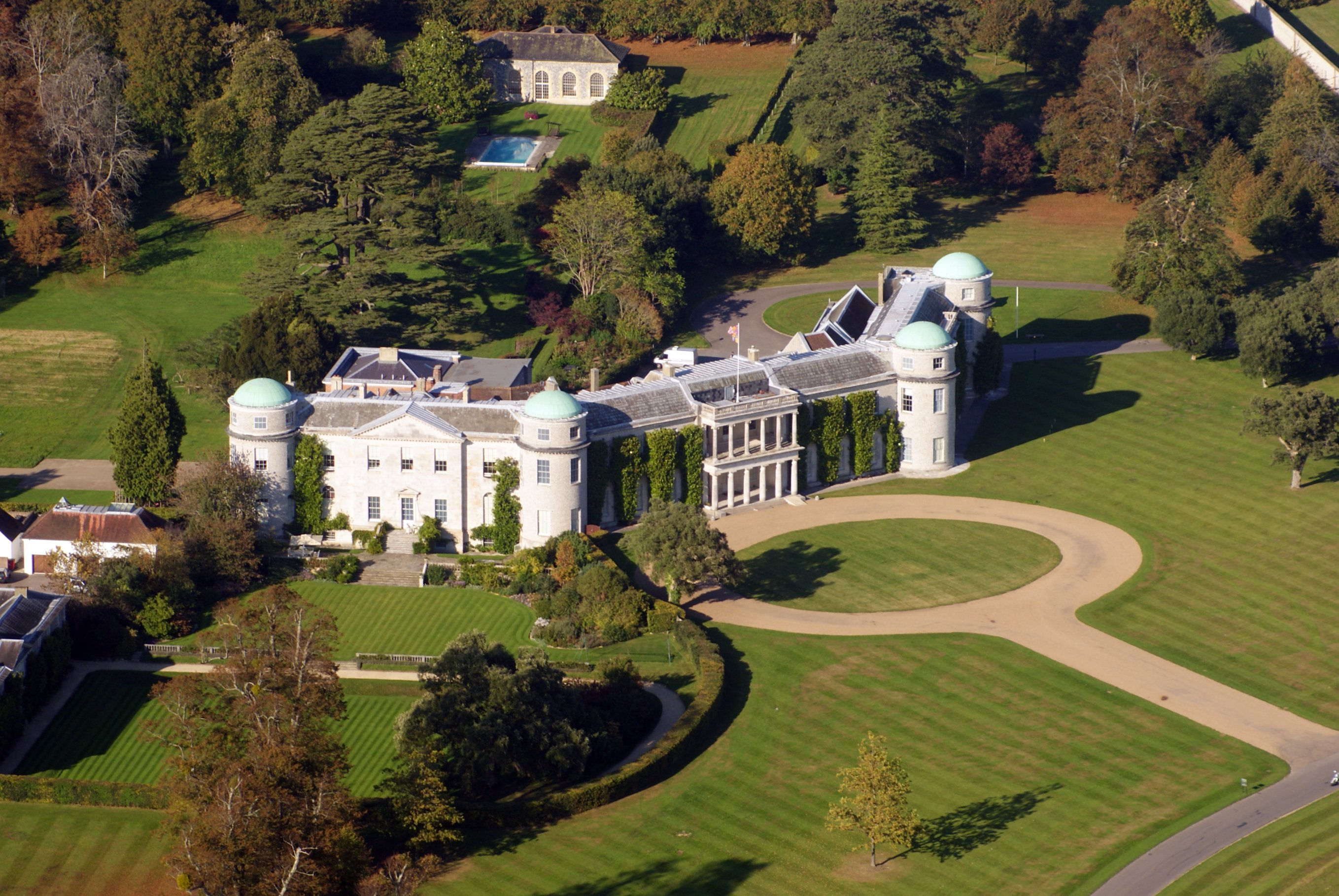
Goodwood House, Sussex (seat of Duke of Richmond)

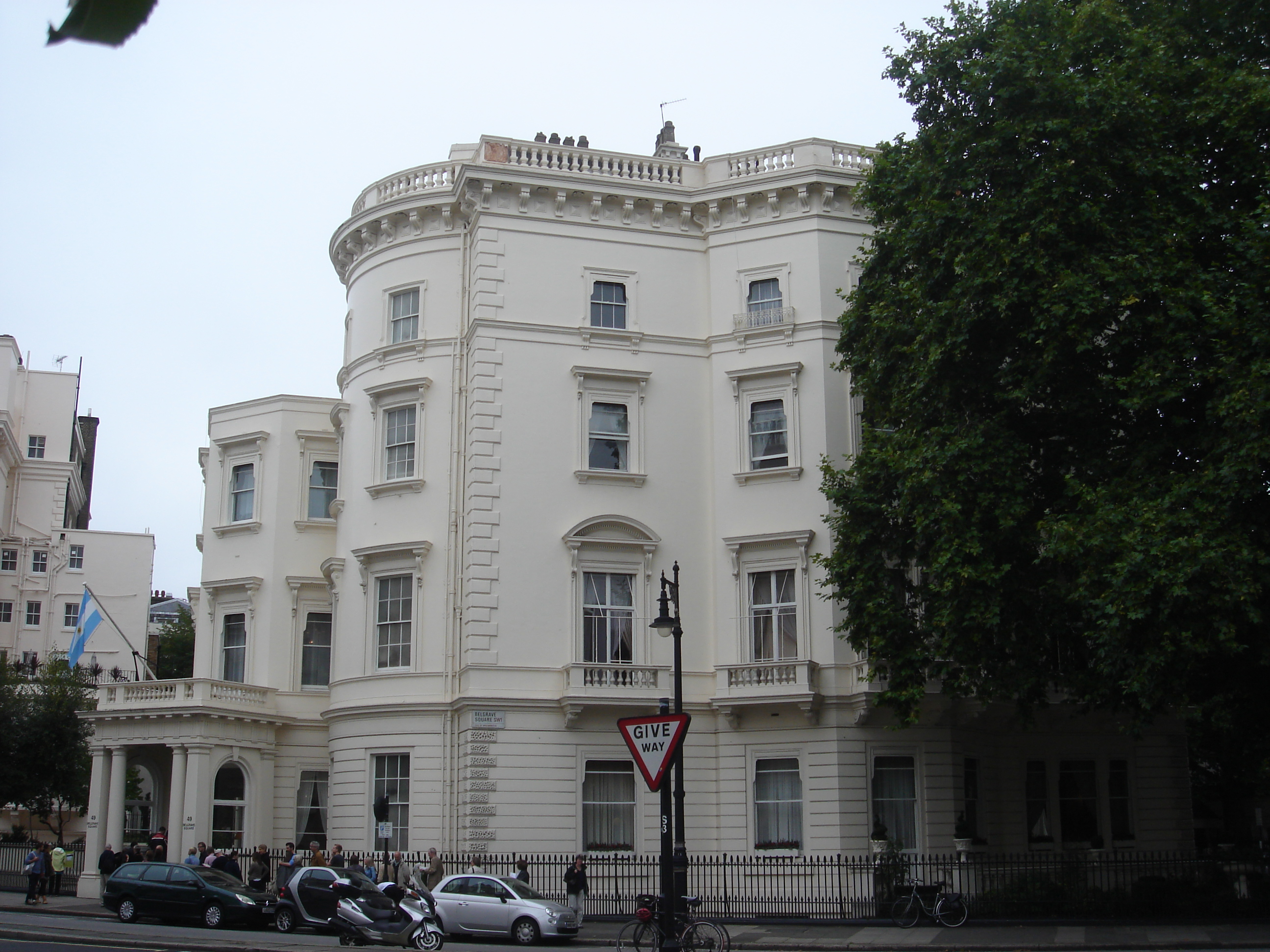
49 Belgrave Square (London townhouse)

== Ancestry ==
Ancestors of Charles Gordon-Lennox, 6th Duke of Richmond

8. Lord George Lennox
4. Charles Lennox, 4th Duke of Richmond
9. Lady Louisa Kerr
2. Charles Gordon-Lennox, 5th Duke of Richmond
10. Alexander Gordon, 4th Duke of Gordon
5. Lady Charlotte Gordon
11. Jane Maxwell
1. Charles Gordon-Lennox, 6th Duke of Richmond
12. Henry Paget, 1st Earl of Uxbridge
6. Henry Paget, 1st Marquess of Anglesey
13. Jane Champagné
3. Lady Caroline Paget
14. George Villiers, 4th Earl of Jersey
7. Lady Caroline Elizabeth Villiers
15. Frances Twysden

== See also ==
- Goodwood Park
- Marylebone Cricket Club

== Bibliography ==
- Porter, Elizabeth (1978). Water Management in England and Wales. Cambridge University Press. ISBN 978-0-521-21865-8.
- Torrance, David (2006). The Scottish Secretaries. Birlinn. ISBN 978-1-84158-476-8.

=== References ===
Parliament of the United Kingdom
Preceded by Lord John Lennox; Earl of Surrey	Member of Parliament for West Sussex; 1841–1860; With: Charles Wyndham 1841–1847; Richard Prime 1847–1854; Henry Wyndham 1854–1860	Succeeded by Henry Wyndham; Sir Walter Bartelott
Political offices
Preceded by Sir Stafford Northcote, Bt	President of the Board of Trade; 1867–1868	Succeeded by John Bright
Preceded by The Lord Aberdare	Lord President of the Council; 1874–1880	Succeeded by The Earl Spencer
Preceded by Joseph Chamberlain	President of the Board of Trade; 1885	Succeeded by Edward Stanhope
New post	Secretary for Scotland; 1885–1886	Succeeded by George Trevelyan
Honorary titles
Preceded by The Earl Fife	Lord Lieutenant of Banffshire; 1879–1903	Succeeded by The Duke of Richmond
Party political offices
Preceded by The Lord Cairns	Leader of the Conservative Party in the House of Lords; 1870–1876	Succeeded by The Earl of Beaconsfield
Academic offices
Preceded by New post	Chancellor of the University of Aberdeen; 1861–1903	Succeeded by The Lord Strathcona and Mount Royal
Peerage of England
Preceded by Charles Gordon-Lennox	Duke of Richmond; 3rd creation 1860–1903	Succeeded by Charles Gordon-Lennox
Peerage of Scotland
Preceded by Charles Gordon-Lennox	Duke of Lennox; 2nd creation 1860–1903	Succeeded by Charles Gordon-Lennox
Peerage of the United Kingdom
New creation	Duke of Gordon; 2nd creation 1876–1903	Succeeded by Charles Gordon-Lennox
French nobility
Preceded by Charles Gordon-Lennox	Duke of Aubigny; 1860–1903	Succeeded by Charles Gordon-Lennox
