= Wilbraham Lennox =

British army general and Victoria Cross recipient

Lieutenant-General Sir Wilbraham Lennox VC KCB
- Born: 4 August 1830; Goodwood, West Sussex
- Died: 7 February 1897 (aged 66); Chester Square, London
- Burial place: Woodvale Cemetery, Brighton
- Relatives: Lord John Lennox (father)
- Military career
- Allegiance: United Kingdom
- Branch: British Army
- Rank: Lieutenant-General
- Units: Royal Engineers
- Conflicts: Crimean War; Indian Mutiny
- Awards: Victoria Cross; Knight Commander of the Order of the Bath; Order of the Medjidieh (Ottoman Empire); Medal of Military Valor (Sardinia)

Lieutenant-General Sir Wilbraham Oates Lennox VC KCB (4 August 1830 – 7 February 1897) was a British Army officer and an English recipient of the Victoria Cross (VC), the highest and most prestigious award for gallantry in the face of the enemy that can be awarded to British and Commonwealth forces. He was the first Royal Engineer officer to win the VC.

== Early life ==
Lennox was born at Goodwood, West Sussex, the son of Lord John Lennox and Louisa Frederica Rodney, and the grandson of Charles Lennox, Duke of Richmond and Captain John Rodney, RN. Lennox attended the Royal Military Academy, Woolwich, and in June 1848 was commissioned second-lieutenant in the Royal Engineers. After further training, he was posted to Ceylon in 1850, leaving in 1854 to take part in the Crimean War. There, he participated in the Battle of Inkerman and the Siege of Sevastopol.

== VC action ==
Lennox was a 24 years old lieutenant in the Corps of Royal Engineers, British Army, at the Siege of Sevastopol during the Crimean War, when he was awarded the VC for his:

Cool and gallant conduct in establishing a lodgement in Tryon's Rifle Pit, and assisting to repel the assaults of the enemy. This brilliant operation drew forth a special order from General Canrobert.

For his Crimea service, Lennox was also mentioned in dispatches and received the Ottoman Order of the Medjidieh (fifth class) and the Sardinian Medal of Military Valor.

== Later career ==
Returning to England in August 1856, Lennox left again in April 1857 for China. His engineer company was however diverted to India and served in the Indian Mutiny. After service at Lucknow, Lennox was mentioned in dispatches and received brevet promotions of major and lieutenant-colonel. He left India in March 1859, and was on the staff of the School of Military Engineering, Chatham from 1866 to 1873. In March 1867 he was made a Companion of the Order of the Bath (CB).

Lennox was attached as an observer to the German army during the 1870–71 Franco-Prussian War, and attended Prussian military manoeuvres in 1869 and 1872. After home service, he became military attaché at Constantinople in October 1876, and accompanied the Turkish armies during the Russo-Turkish War. He commanded the Royal Engineers at the Curragh, Ireland, from 1878 until his promotion to major-general in August 1881. From August 1884 he commanded the garrison at Alexandria, Egypt, and was responsible for landing the troops and stores for the 1884–85 Gordon relief expedition. In April 1887 he moved to command the troops in Ceylon, returning home in 1888 on promotion to lieutenant-general. He was made a Knight Commander of the Order of the Bath (KCB) in May 1891 and was director-general of military education at the War Office from January 1893 until his retirement in May 1895.

Lennox died at his home in Pimlico, London, on 7 February 1897, aged 66.

== Family ==
Lennox was married twice. His first marriage was to Mary Harriet Harris and produced two children: Gerald Wilbraham Stuart Lennox, born on 29 April 1862, and Lilian Emily Lennox, born on 19 July 1863. Mrs Lennox died soon after, on 22 July 1863, and her infant daughter died a few days later, on 3 August 1863. His second marriage was to Susan Hay Sinclair, a descendant of the Sinclair-Lockhart baronets. This marriage produced five children.

== Legacy ==
Lennox was buried in the family plot in Lewes Road (Woodvale) Cemetery, Brighton, Sussex. In 2013 the Victoria Cross Trust launched a campaign to raise £25,000 to restore his grave, that had been neglected and was in a state of disrepair.

Lennox's medals, including his Victoria Cross, are displayed at the Royal Engineers Museum, Gillingham, Kent.

Lennox Row, a road in Brompton, Gillingham, Kent is named after him.
