= Lord Henry Lennox =

British politician

The Right Honourable Lord Henry Lennox
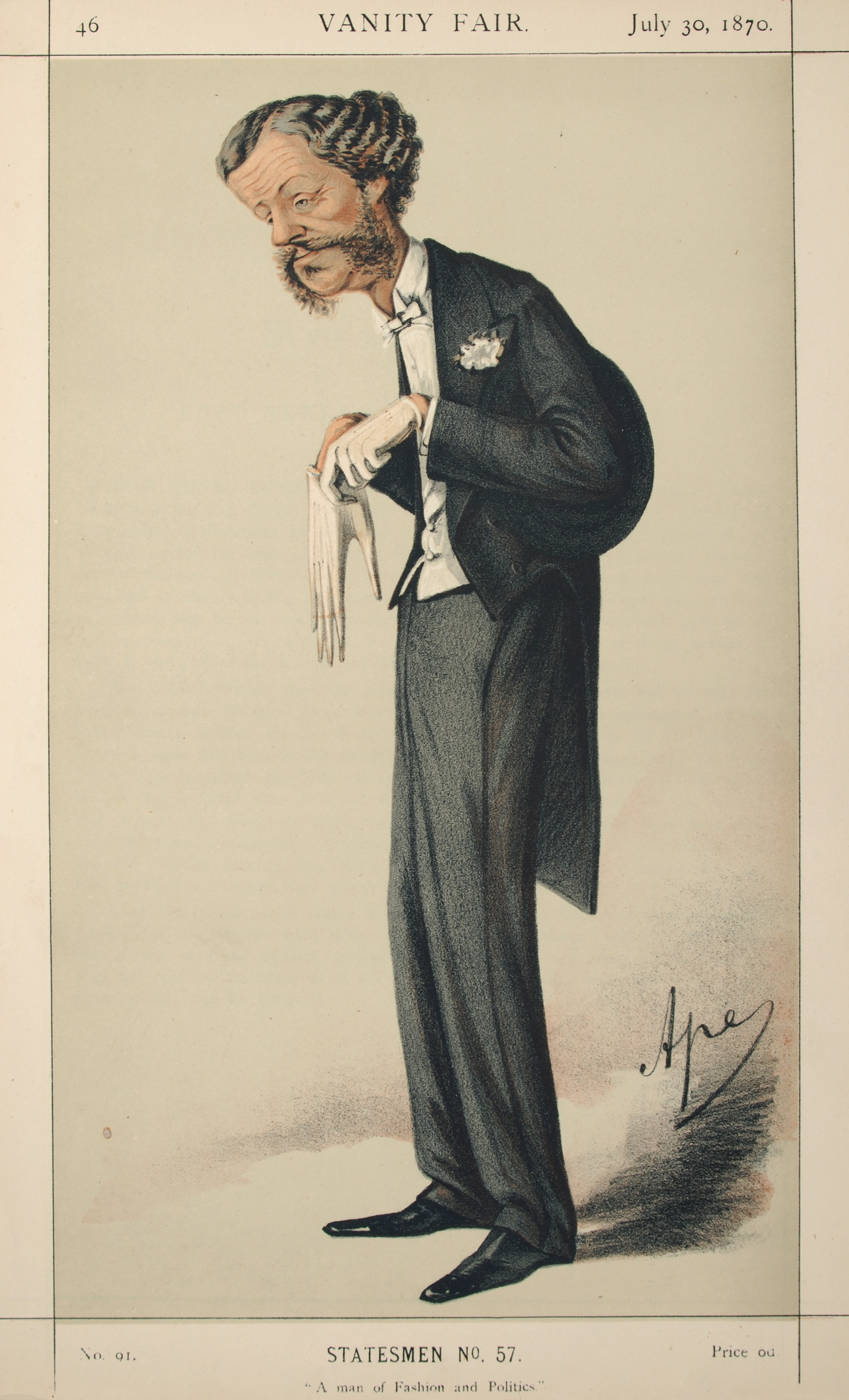
- Caricature by Ape published in Vanity Fair in 1870.

First Secretary of the Admiralty
- In office 16 July 1866 – 1 December 1868
- Monarch: Victoria
- Prime Minister: The Earl of Derby; Benjamin Disraeli
- Preceded by: Thomas Baring
- Succeeded by: William Edward Baxter

First Commissioner of Works
- In office 21 March 1874 – 14 August 1876
- Monarch: Victoria
- Prime Minister: Benjamin Disraeli
- Preceded by: William Patrick Adam
- Succeeded by: Hon. Gerard Noel

Personal details
- Born: 2 November 1821
- Died: 29 August 1886 (aged 64)
- Party: Conservative
- Spouse: Amelia Brooman (d. 1903)
- Education: University of Oxford

Lord Henry George Charles Gordon-Lennox PC (né Lennox; 2 November 1821 – 29 August 1886), known as Lord Henry Lennox, was a British Conservative politician who sat in the House of Commons from 1846 to 1885 and was a close friend of Benjamin Disraeli.

== Background and education ==
Lennox was the third son of Charles Gordon-Lennox, 5th Duke of Richmond, and Lady Caroline, daughter of Field Marshal Henry Paget, 1st Marquess of Anglesey. He was the brother of Charles Gordon-Lennox, 6th Duke of Richmond, Lord Alexander Gordon-Lennox and Lord George Gordon-Lennox. He was educated at The Prebendal School, Chichester, then University of Oxford. Henry was born with the surname Lennox; when his father inherited the Gordon estates from his uncle, the father took the surname Gordon-Lennox for himself and his issue, by royal licence dated 9 August 1836. Henry was nonetheless commonly known by only his second surname.

== Political career ==
Lennox entered the House of Commons in 1846 as Member of Parliament for Chichester, in Sussex. He represented this constituency until 1885, when he stood for Partick, but was defeated.

Lennox held office in every Conservative government between 1852 and 1876. He was a Junior Lord of the Treasury in 1852 and between 1858 and 1859 in the first two short-lived governments of the Earl of Derby before becoming First Secretary of the Admiralty in 1866 in Derby's last government, a post he held until 1868, the last year under the premiership of his close friend Benjamin Disraeli. According to John F. Beeler in British naval policy in the Gladstone-Disraeli era, 1866-1880, Lennox acted as a spy to the then Chancellor of the Exchequer, Disraeli, informing him of the intentions of leading admirals.

He served again under Disraeli as First Commissioner of Works from 1874 to 1876 and was admitted to the Privy Council in 1874. He was forced to resign as First Commissioner of Works after revelations in the case of Twycross v Grant regarding the Lisbon Tramways swindle, of which company he was a director.

== Personal life ==
Lennox married Amelia Susannah (née Smith, then Brooman), widow of John White, in 1883. They had no children. He died in August 1886, aged 64, and was buried in the family vault in the Lady Chapel of Chichester Cathedral. Lady Henry Lennox died in February 1903. John White was the uncle of another peer, Lord Overtoun, while lady Amelia was the great-grandmother of 1950s MP Richard Brooman-White.

Parliament of the United Kingdom
Preceded by John Abel Smith; Lord Arthur Lennox	Member of Parliament for Chichester; 1846–1885; With: John Abel Smith 1846–1859; Humphrey William Freeland 1859–1863; John Abel Smith 1863–1868 (representation reduced to one member 1868)	Succeeded by Earl of March
Political offices
Preceded by Thomas Baring	First Secretary of the Admiralty; 1866–1868	Succeeded by William Edward Baxter
Preceded by William Patrick Adam	First Commissioner of Works; 1874–1876	Succeeded by Hon. Gerard Noel
