= 1869 West Sussex by-election =

UK Parliamentary by-election

The 1869 West Sussex by-election was held on 17 April 1869. The by-election was held due to the succession to a peerage of the incumbent Conservative MP Henry Wyndham. It was won by the unopposed Conservative candidate the Earl of March.
