= Charlotte Lennox, Duchess of Richmond =

Scottish aristocrat and peeress (1768–1842)

Her Grace The Duchess of Richmond and Lennox
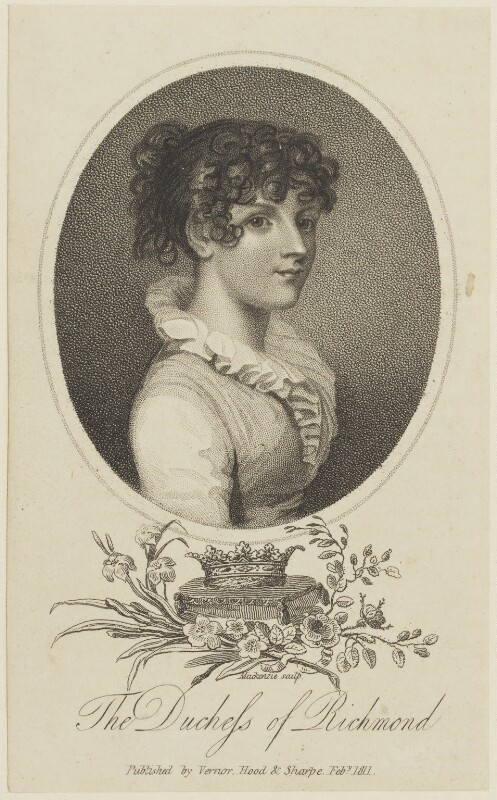
- Born: Charlotte Gordon; 20 September 1768; Gordon Castle, Moray, Scotland
- Died: 5 May 1842 (aged 73); London, England
- Noble family: Gordon (by birth); Lennox (by marriage)
- Spouse: Charles Lennox, 4th Duke of Richmond (m. 1789; died 1819)
- Issue: 14, including Charles, George, William, Sussex and Arthur
- Father: Alexander Gordon, 4th Duke of Gordon
- Mother: Jane Maxwell

Charlotte Lennox, Duchess of Richmond and Lennox (née Gordon; 20 September 1768 – 5 May 1842) was a Scottish aristocrat and peeress best known as the hostess of the famed ball held in Brussels on the eve of the Battle of Quatre Bras.

== Biography ==
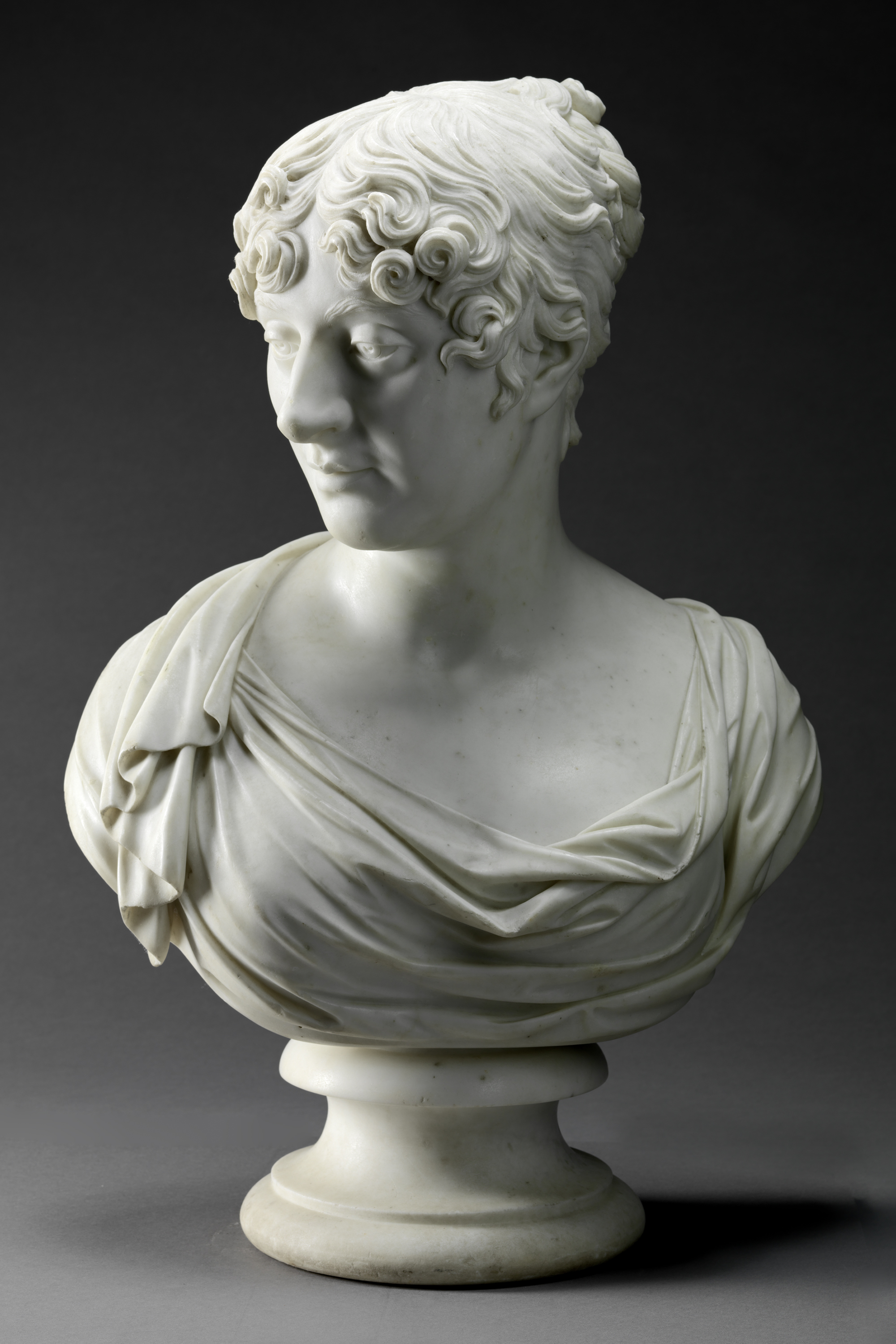
Bust of the Duchess, by Joseph Nollekens

Born at Gordon Castle, Lady Charlotte Gordon was the eldest child of Alexander Gordon, 4th Duke of Gordon, and his wife, Jane Maxwell. On 9 September 1789, she married Charles Lennox, 4th Duke of Richmond, 4th Duke of Lennox and 4th Duke of Aubigny.

In 1814, the family moved to Brussels, where the Duchess gave the ball at which the Duke of Wellington received confirmation that the Army of the North under the command of Napoleon Bonaparte had entered the territory of the United Kingdom of the Netherlands near Charleroi (in what is now the Kingdom of Belgium). The Duchess and her family continued to live in Brussels until 1818, when her husband was appointed Governor General of British North America. The Duchess was widowed in 1819, and in 1836, she inherited the vast Gordon estates on the death of her brother, the 5th Duke of Gordon, who left no legitimate children.

She died in London on 5 May 1842 at the age of 73.

== Family ==
The Duke and Duchess had seven sons and seven daughters:

- Charles Gordon-Lennox, 5th Duke of Richmond (3 August 1791 – 21 October 1860), married Lady Caroline Paget, eldest daughter of Field Marshal Henry Paget, 1st Marquess of Anglesey, and had issue; ancestor of Diana, Princess of Wales through his granddaughter Rosalind Hamilton, Duchess of Abercorn
- Lady Mary Lennox (c. 1792 – 7 December 1847), married Lieutenant-Colonel Sir Charles Fitzroy, and had issue
- Lieutenant-Colonel Lord John George Lennox (3 October 1793 – 10 November 1873), married Louisa Rodney, daughter of Captain Hon. John Rodney, and had issue
- Lady Sarah Lennox (c. 1794 – 8 September 1873), married General Sir Peregrine Maitland, and had issue
- Lady Georgiana Lennox (30 September 1795 – 15 December 1891), married General William FitzGerald-de Ros, 22nd Baron de Ros, and had issue
- Lord Henry Adam Lennox (6 September 1797 – 25 February 1812), fell overboard from HMS Blake and drowned
- Captain Lord William Pitt Lennox (20 September 1799 – 18 February 1881), married (1) Mary Ann Paton, eldest daughter of George Paton; (2) Ellen Smith, daughter of John Smith, by whom he had issue; (3) Maria Molyneux, eldest daughter of Revd Capel Molyneux
- Lady Jane Lennox (c. 1800 – 27 March 1861), married Laurence Peel, and had issue
- Captain Lord Frederick Lennox (24 January 1801 – 25 October 1829), died unmarried
- Lord Sussex Lennox (11 June 1802 – 12 April 1874), married Hon. Mary Lawless, elder daughter of Valentine Lawless, 2nd Baron Cloncurry, and had issue
- Lady Louisa Maddelena Lennox (2 October 1803 – 2 March 1900), married Rt Hon. William Tighe, and had no issue
- Lady Charlotte Lennox (c. 1804 – 20 August 1833), married Admiral Maurice Berkeley, 1st Baron FitzHardinge of Bristol, and had issue
- Lieutenant-Colonel Lord Arthur Lennox (2 October 1806 – 15 January 1864), married Adelaide Campbell, fifth daughter of Colonel John Campbell, and had issue
- Lady Sophia Georgiana Lennox (21 July 1809 – 17 January 1902), married Lord Thomas Cecil, and had no issue
