= Charles Wyndham (1796–1866) =

English politician

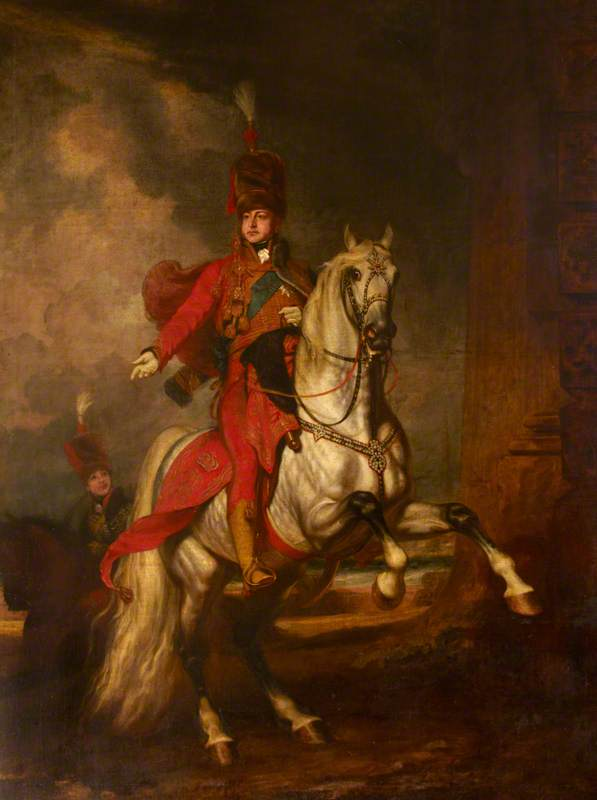
HRH the Prince Regent (1762–1830), Later George IV, and Colonel Charles Wyndham (1796–1866)

Col. Charles Wyndham Ilive (10 September 1796 – 16 February 1866), was an English politician. He was Member of Parliament (MP) for West Sussex from 1841 to 1847.

Wyndham was the fifth son of George Wyndham, 3rd Earl of Egremont (1751–1837) and his mistress, Elizabeth Ilive (died 1822), of Petworth House, near Chichester, West Sussex. His parents married in 1801 after the birth of seven illegitimate children. He was a descendant of John Wyndham who played an important role in the establishment of defence organisation in the West Country against the threat of Spanish invasion.

He married Elizabeth Anne Hepburne-Scott, daughter of Lord Polwarth, but had no children.

Parliament of the United Kingdom
Preceded by Henry Howard, Earl of Surrey and Lord John George Lennox	Member of Parliament for West Sussex; 1841–1847; With: The Earl of March	Succeeded by The Earl of March and Richard Prime
