= Richard Prime =

British politician

Richard Prime (1 April 1784 – 7 November 1866) was a British Conservative Party politician.

He was elected as a Member of Parliament (MP) for the Western division of Sussex at a by-election in February 1847, and held the seat until he resigned from the House of Commons on 28 January 1854 through appointment as Steward of the Chiltern Hundreds.

Parliament of the United Kingdom
| Preceded by Charles Wyndham; Charles Gordon-Lennox | Member of Parliament for Western Sussex; 1847–1854; With: Charles Gordon-Lennox | Succeeded by Hon. Henry Wyndham; Charles Gordon-Lennox |
