= West Sussex (constituency) =

Parliamentary constituency in the United Kingdom, 1832–1885

- Former county constituency for the House of Commons
- Context of 1832-1868. Extract from 1837 result: the main, south coast 'doubly' orange area.

1832–1885
- Seats: two
- Created from: Sussex
- Replaced by: Chichester; Horsham; Lewes

West Sussex (formally the Western division of Sussex) was a parliamentary constituency in the county of Sussex, which returned two Members of Parliament to the House of Commons of the Parliament of the United Kingdom, elected by the bloc vote system.

It was created under the Great Reform Act for the 1832 general election, and abolished for the 1885 general election.

== Boundaries ==
1832–1885: The Rapes of Arundel, Bramber and Chichester.

== Members of Parliament ==
Election	1st Member	1st Party	2nd Member	2nd Party
1832	Lord John Lennox	Whig	The Earl of Surrey	Whig
1841	The Earl of March	Conservative	Charles Wyndham	Conservative
1847	The Earl of March	Conservative	Richard Prime	Conservative
1854 by-election	The Earl of March	Conservative	Henry Wyndham	Conservative
1860 by-election	Walter Barttelot	Conservative	Henry Wyndham	Conservative
1869 by-election	Walter Barttelot	Conservative	The Earl of March	Conservative
1885	constituency abolished			

== Election results ==
=== Elections in the 1830s ===
General election 1832: West Sussex
Party	Candidate	Votes	%
Whig	John Lennox	Unopposed	
Whig	Henry Howard	Unopposed	
Registered electors		2,365	
Whig win (new seat)			
Whig win (new seat)			

General election 1835: West Sussex
Party	Candidate	Votes	%
Whig	John Lennox	Unopposed	
Whig	Henry Howard	Unopposed	
Registered electors		2,408	
Whig hold			
Whig hold			

General election 1837: West Sussex
Party	Candidate	Votes	%
Whig	John Lennox	1,291	35.8
Whig	Henry Howard	1,267	35.1
Conservative	Henry Wyndham	1,049	29.1
Majority		218	6.0
Turnout		2,202	69.9
Registered electors		3,152	
Whig hold			
Whig hold			

=== Elections in the 1840s ===
General election 1841: West Sussex
Party	Candidate	Votes	%	±%
Conservative	Charles Gordon-Lennox	Unopposed		
Conservative	Charles Wyndham	Unopposed		
Registered electors		3,618		
Conservative gain from Whig				
Conservative gain from Whig				

Wyndham resigned by accepting the office of Steward of the Chiltern Hundreds, causing a by-election.

By-election, 2 February 1847: West Sussex
Party	Candidate	Votes	%	±%
Conservative	Richard Prime	Unopposed		
Conservative hold				

General election 1847: West Sussex
Party	Candidate	Votes	%	±%
Conservative	Charles Gordon-Lennox	Unopposed		
Conservative	Richard Prime	Unopposed		
Registered electors		3,488		
Conservative hold				
Conservative hold				

=== Elections in the 1850s ===
General election 1852: West Sussex
Party	Candidate	Votes	%	±%
Conservative	Charles Gordon-Lennox	Unopposed		
Conservative	Richard Prime	Unopposed		
Registered electors		3,257		
Conservative hold				
Conservative hold				

Prime resigned by accepting the office of Steward of the Chiltern Hundreds, causing a by-election.

By-election, 13 February 1854: West Sussex
Party	Candidate	Votes	%	±%
Conservative	Henry Wyndham	Unopposed		
Conservative hold				

General election 1857: West Sussex
Party	Candidate	Votes	%	±%
Conservative	Charles Gordon-Lennox	Unopposed		
Conservative	Henry Wyndham	Unopposed		
Registered electors		2,941		
Conservative hold				
Conservative hold				

Gordon-Lennox was appointed President of the Poor Law Board, requiring a by-election.

By-election, 9 March 1859: West Sussex
Party	Candidate	Votes	%	±%
Conservative	Charles Gordon-Lennox	Unopposed		
Conservative hold				

General election 1859: West Sussex
Party	Candidate	Votes	%	±%
Conservative	Charles Gordon-Lennox	Unopposed		
Conservative	Henry Wyndham	Unopposed		
Registered electors		2,853		
Conservative hold				
Conservative hold				

=== Elections in the 1860s ===
Gordon-Lennox succeeded to the peerage, becoming 6th Duke of Richmond and causing a by-election.

By-election, 27 December 1860: West Sussex
Party	Candidate	Votes	%	±%
Conservative	Walter Barttelot	Unopposed		
Conservative hold				

General election 1865: West Sussex
Party	Candidate	Votes	%	±%
Conservative	Walter Barttelot	Unopposed		
Conservative	Henry Wyndham	Unopposed		
Registered electors		2,607		
Conservative hold				
Conservative hold				

General election 1868: West Sussex
Party	Candidate	Votes	%	±%
Conservative	Walter Barttelot	Unopposed		
Conservative	Henry Wyndham	Unopposed		
Registered electors		3,672		
Conservative hold				
Conservative hold				

Wyndham succeeded to the peerage, becoming 2nd Baron Leconfield and causing a by-election.

By-election, 17 April 1869: West Sussex
Party	Candidate	Votes	%	±%
Conservative	Charles Gordon-Lennox	Unopposed		
Conservative hold				

=== Elections in the 1870s ===
General election 1874: West Sussex
Party	Candidate	Votes	%	±%
Conservative	Walter Barttelot	Unopposed		
Conservative	Charles Gordon-Lennox	Unopposed		
Registered electors		3,865		
Conservative hold				
Conservative hold				

=== Elections in the 1880s ===
General election 1880: West Sussex
Party	Candidate	Votes	%	±%
Conservative	Walter Barttelot	Unopposed		
Conservative	Charles Gordon-Lennox	Unopposed		
Registered electors		3,886		
Conservative hold				
Conservative hold				
