= Humphrey William Freeland =

British Liberal politician

Member of Parliament for Chichester
- In office 30 April 1859 – 21 February 1863 Serving with Henry Gordon-Lennox
- Preceded by: John Abel Smith; Henry Gordon-Lennox
- Succeeded by: John Abel Smith; Henry Gordon-Lennox

Personal details
- Born: 28 August 1814
- Died: 2 October 1892 (aged 78)
- Party: Liberal

Humphrey William Freeland (28 August 1814 – 2 October 1892) was a British Liberal politician.

Freeland was elected Liberal MP for Chichester at the 1859 general election but later resigned—by being appointed a Steward of the Manor of Hempholme—from the seat in 1863.

Parliament of the United Kingdom
Preceded by John Abel Smith; Henry Gordon-Lennox	Member of Parliament for Chichester; 1859–1863; With: Henry Gordon-Lennox	Succeeded by John Abel Smith; Henry Gordon-Lennox
