= Lord Sussex Lennox =

English cricketer

Sussex Lennox
Personal information
- Full name: Lord Sussex Lennox
- Born: 11 June 1802; England
- Died: 12 April 1874 (aged 71); England

Domestic team information
- Years: Team
- 1826: Marylebone Cricket Club
- Source: CricketArchive, 18 June 2013

Lord Sussex Lennox (11 June 1802 – 12 April 1874) was an English cricketer. He was associated with Marylebone Cricket Club and was recorded in one match in 1826, totalling five runs with a highest score of three and holding no catches.

== Early life ==
He was a younger son, of fourteen children, of Charles Lennox, 4th Duke of Richmond and Lady Charlotte Gordon, best remembered for the Duchess of Richmond's ball which she threw the night before the Battle of Waterloo.

His paternal grandparents were General Lord George Lennox (the younger son of the 2nd Duke of Richmond), and Lady Louisa Kerr (a daughter of the 4th Marquess of Lothian). His mother was the eldest child of Alexander Gordon, 4th Duke of Gordon, and Jane Maxwell (a daughter of Sir William Maxwell, 3rd Baronet).

== Career ==
In 1834, he served as Postmaster General of Jamaica, appointed by his elder brother, Charles Gordon-Lennox, 5th Duke of Richmond, who was the Postmaster General of the United Kingdom.

== Personal life ==
On 3 April 1828, Lord Sussex was married to the Hon. Mary Margaret (née Lawless) Fock, Baroness de Robeck. The daughter of Valentine Lawless, 2nd Baron Cloncurry, and, his first wife, Elizabeth Georgiana Morgan (a daughter of Lt.-Gen. Charles Morgan), Lord Sussex's marriage to the Lady de Robeck caused some comment as she had divorced her first husband, Henry Fock, 3rd Baron de Robeck, to marry him, an unusual step for the time (although her parents' marriage had also ended in divorce, following a notorious lawsuit by her father against her mother for criminal conversation). Together, they had three children:

- Berkeley Lennox (1828–1857), an officer in the British Army.
- Sussex William Lennox (1831–1898), a Lieutenant-General in the Madras Infantry; he married Eleanor Jane Peters, daughter of William Henry Peters, in 1867.
- Charles Edward Lennox (1834–1899), a captain in the 102nd Foot who was Honorary Major and Staff Paymaster; he died unmarried.

He was accused of adultery with a Mrs. Stone by her husband in 1843, which was "proved and not denied".

Lord Sussex died on 12 April 1874.

== Bibliography ==
- Haygarth, Arthur (1996) [1862]. Scores & Biographies, Volume 1 (1744–1826). Kennington: Frederick Lillywhite. ISBN 978-19-00592-23-9.
- Haygarth, Arthur (1997) [1862]. Scores & Biographies, Volume 2 (1827–1840). Kennington: Frederick Lillywhite. ISBN 978-19-00592-23-9.
