= Lord George Lennox (politician, born 1793) =

British soldier and Whig politician

- Born: John George Lennox; 3 October 1793
- Died: 10 November 1873 (aged 80)
- Occupations: Soldier; politician
- Known for: British Army (1811–1818), Chichester MP (1819–1831), Lord of the Bedchamber to Prince Albert (1840–1861)
- Political party: Whig
- Spouse: Louisa Frederica Rodney (m. 1818; died 1865)
- Children: Major-General Augustus Lennox; General Sir Wilbraham Lennox
- Parents: Charles Lennox, 4th Duke of Richmond (father); Lady Charlotte Gordon (mother)

Lieutenant-Colonel Lord John George Lennox (3 October 1793 – 10 November 1873), was a British soldier and Whig politician.

John George Lennox was born 3 October 1793, the second son of Charles Lennox, 4th Duke of Richmond and the former Lady Charlotte Gordon. Lennox joined the Army in 1811 and was an ADC to the Duke of Wellington from 1813, at Waterloo and up to 1818. He was returned to Parliament for Chichester in 1819 (succeeding his father), a seat he held until 1831. He then represented Sussex between 1831 and 1832 and Sussex West between 1832 and 1842.

He was Lord of the Bedchamber to Prince Albert from 1840 until Albert's death in 1861.

Lennox married Louisa Fredericka, daughter of the Hon. John Rodney, in 1818. They had several children, including Major-General Augustus Lennox and General Sir Wilbraham Lennox. She died in January 1865. Lennox survived her by eight years and died in November 1873, aged 80.

Parliament of the United Kingdom
Preceded by Earl of March; William Huskisson	Member of Parliament for Chichester; 1819–1831; With: William Huskisson 1819–1823; William Stephen Poyntz 1823–1830; John Smith 1830–1831	Succeeded by Lord Arthur Lennox; John Abel Smith
Preceded by Walter Burrell; Herbert Barrett Curteis	Member of Parliament for Sussex; 1831–1832; With: Herbert Barrett Curteis	Constituency abolished
New constituency	Member of Parliament for Sussex West; 1832–1841; With: Earl of Surrey	Succeeded by Earl of March; Charles Wyndham
