= Charles Lennox, 4th Duke of Richmond =

British politician

General His Grace The Duke of Richmond KG PC
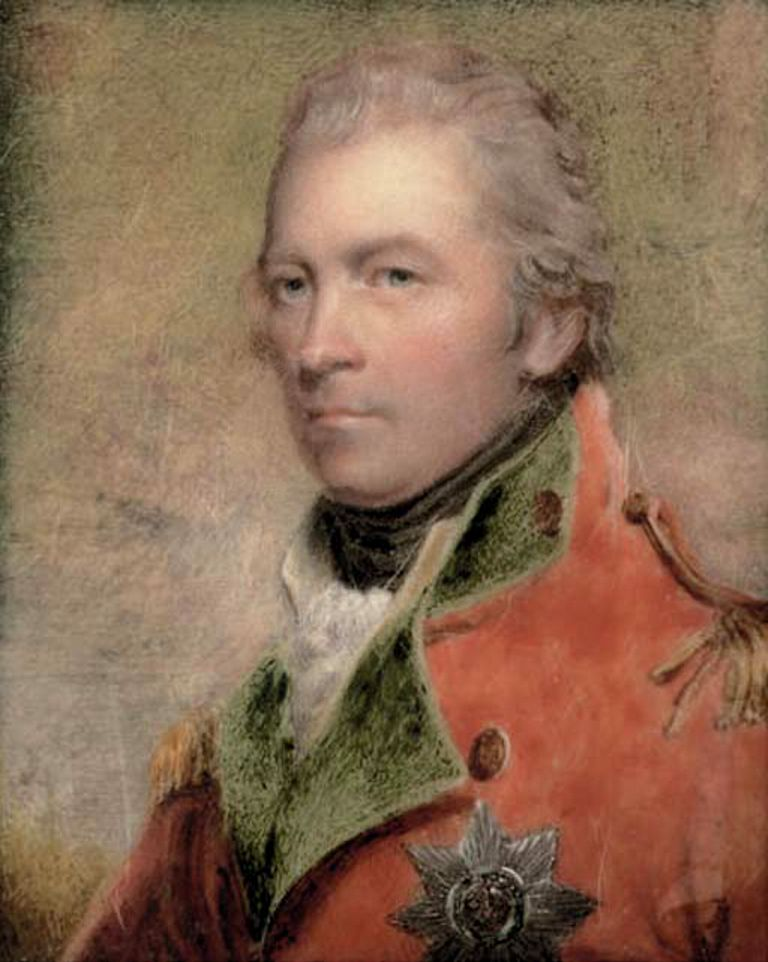

Lord Lieutenant of Ireland
- In office 11 April 1807 – 23 June 1813
- Monarch: George III
- Prime Minister: The Duke of Portland; Rt Hon. Spencer Perceval; The Earl of Liverpool
- Preceded by: The Duke of Bedford
- Succeeded by: The Viscount Whitworth

Governor General of British North America
- In office 1818–1819
- Monarch: George III
- Preceded by: Sir John Sherbrooke
- Succeeded by: The Earl of Dalhousie

Member of Parliament for Sussex
- In office 1790–1806
- Preceded by: Lord George Lennox
- Succeeded by: Hon. Charles Wyndham

Personal details
- Born: 9 December 1764 Gordon Castle, Scotland
- Died: 28 August 1819 (aged 54) Richmond, British North America
- Party: Tory
- Spouse: Lady Charlotte Gordon
- Children: 14, including Charles Gordon-Lennox, and Lords John, William, Sussex and Arthur Lennox
- Parent(s): Lord George Lennox; Lady Louisa Kerr

Military service
- Allegiance: United Kingdom
- Branch/service: British Army
- Years of service: 1785–1819
- Rank: General
- Unit: Coldstream Guards
- Commands: 35th Regiment of Foot
- Battles/wars: French Revolutionary Wars; West Indies Campaign; Napoleonic Wars; Hundred Days

General Charles Lennox, 4th Duke of Richmond, 4th Duke of Lennox, 4th Duke of Aubigny, KG, PC (9 December 1764 – 28 August 1819), was a British Army officer, member of the House of Lords and Governor General of British North America.

== Background ==
Born to General Lord George Lennox, younger son of Charles Lennox, 2nd Duke of Richmond and Lennox, and Lady Louisa Kerr, elder daughter of the 4th Marquess of Lothian, his aunts included the famous four Lennox sisters.

== Cricket ==
A keen cricketer, as an accomplished right-hand batsman and noted wicket-keeper, he is almost always listed as Colonel the Hon. Charles Lennox in contemporary scorecards. He made 55 recorded appearances from 1784 to 1800, and played as an amateur in several county matches thereafter.

A founder member of the Marylebone Cricket Club, in 1786, together with the Earl of Winchilsea and Nottingham, Lennox offered to underwrite any losses Thomas Lord might suffer by establishing his proposed new cricket ground; thus Lennox facilitated the opening of Marylebone's first cricket ground, Lord's Old Ground, at its original location in 1787. Now known as "The Home of Cricket", Lord's is the sport's most famous venue.

== Army general ==
Commissioned in 1787 as an Army Captain at the age of 23, on 27 May 1789, when a Colonel in the Duke of York's Regiment, Lennox was involved in a duel with Frederick, Duke of York, who had expressed the opinion that "Colonel Lennox had heard words spoken to him at Daubigny's, to which no gentleman ought to have submitted", effectively an accusation of failing to respond to an insult in the way that a gentleman should. At Wimbledon Common, His Royal Highness was attended by Lord Rawdon, and Lennox by the Earl of Winchilsea and Nottingham. Lennox fired, but his ball "grazed His Royal Highness's curl"; the Duke did not fire. Lennox shortly after exchanged his company for the commission of Lieutenant-Colonel in the 35th Regiment of Foot.

On 1 July of the same year, Lennox was involved in another duel, with Theophilus Swift Esq., in consequence of a pamphlet criticising his character published under Swift's name. They met at a field near Uxbridge Road, where Swift was wounded in the body, but recovered.

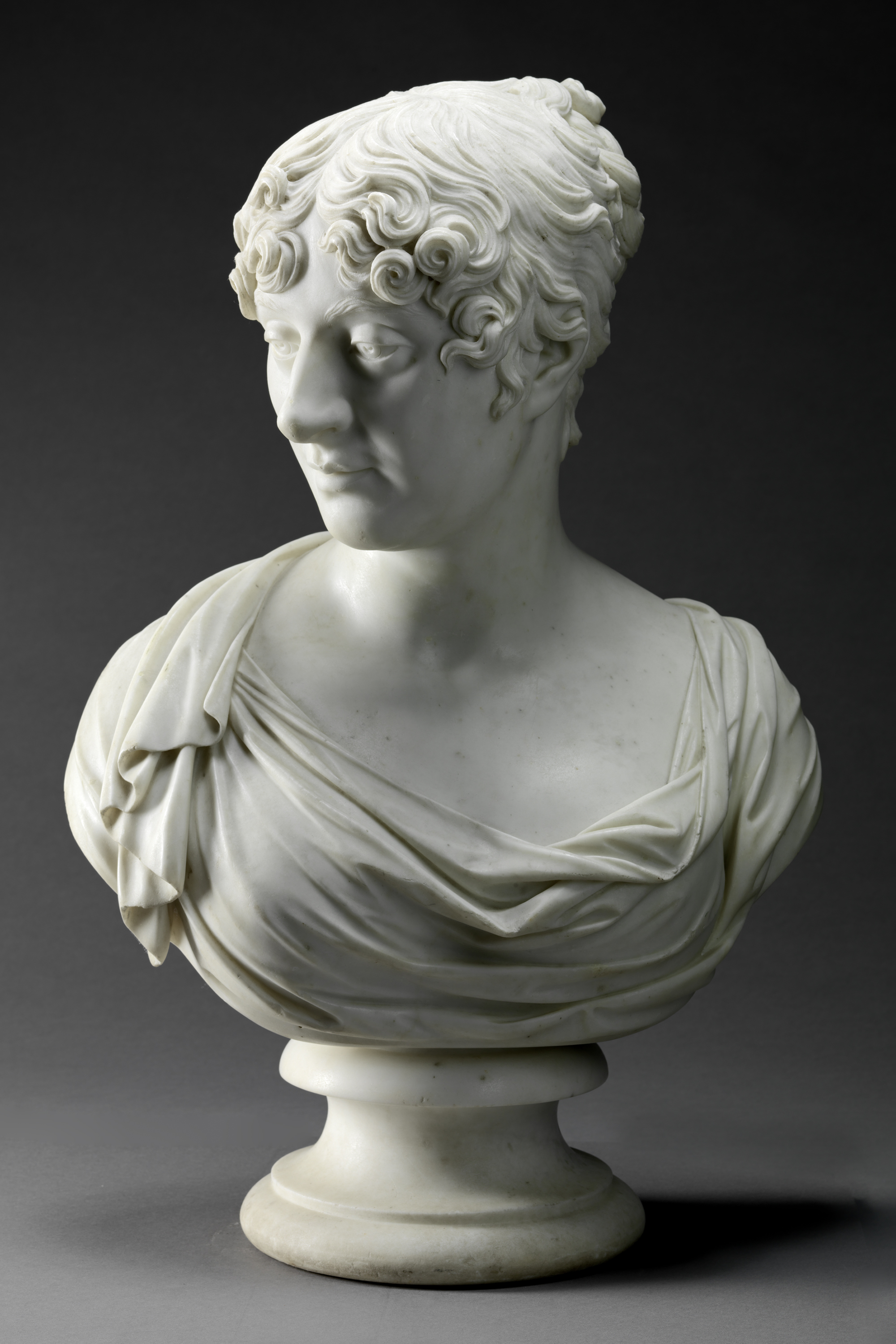
Charlotte, 4th Duchess of Richmond and Lennox (1768–1842), bust by Joseph Nollekens, 1812

Later that year, on 9 September 1789, Lennox married Lady Charlotte Gordon. In 1794 and 1795 he saw action at naval engagements against the French in the West Indies and Gibraltar, but was sent home after coming into conflict with his superiors.

Lennox also served as Member of Parliament for Sussex, following his father, from 1790 until succeeding to the dukedom.

== Duke ==
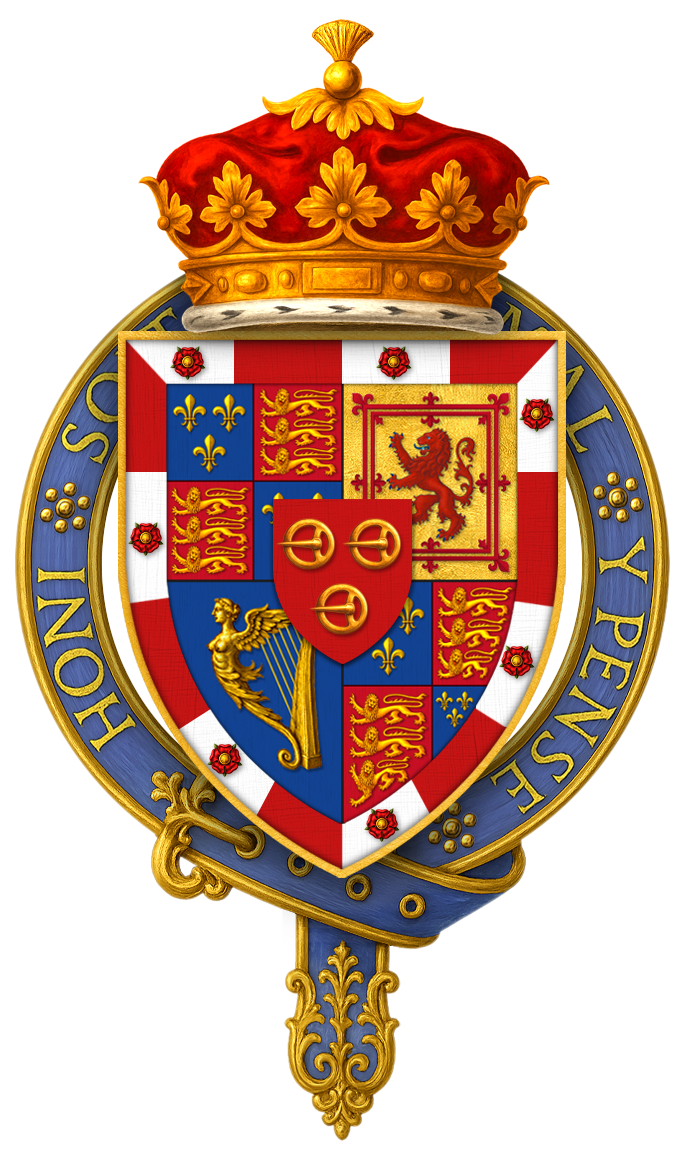
Garter stall plate of the 4th Duke of Richmond

He succeeded as 4th Duke on 29 December 1806, upon the death of his uncle, Charles Lennox, 3rd Duke of Richmond and Lennox. In April 1807 he was appointed Lord-Lieutenant of Ireland, remaining in post until 1813.

Richmond served during the Napoleonic Wars and, in 1815, was commanding reserve forces at Brussels to protect that city were Napoleon to win the Battle of Waterloo. On 15 June, the night before the Battle of Quatre Bras, his wife held a ball for his fellow officers. The glittering occasion became famous as the Duchess of Richmond's ball and was immortalised by William Makepeace Thackeray in Vanity Fair and by Lord Byron in Childe Harold's Pilgrimage.

An observer at Quatre Bras the next day, then at Waterloo on 18 June, the Duke played no active part at either, his command being the defence of the city of Brussels.

== Governor-General of Canada ==
In 1818 Richmond was appointed Governor-General of British North America.

During the summer of 1819, whilst touring Upper and Lower Canada to inspect the planned route for the Rideau Canal, Richmond was bitten on the hand by a fox. The wound healed and the duke continued his tour, but soon the initial symptoms of hydrophobia reappeared, a clear sign of rabies: the virus developed rapidly, and he died on 28 August. Richmond's body was returned to Quebec City, where he was buried at the Cathedral of the Holy Trinity on 4 September.

The night before his death, he slept at the "Masonic Arms", which was renamed the "Duke of Richmond Arms" to commemorate the visit.

The family titles were inherited by his son Charles Gordon-Lennox, 5th Duke of Richmond and Lennox.

== Legacy ==
In Canada:

- Richmond, Ontario
- Richmond Hill, Ontario
- Richmond Street in London, Ontario
- Richmond Street in Toronto, Ontario
- March Township, Ontario
- Huntley Township, Ontario
- Torbolton Township, Ontario
- Fitzroy Township, Ontario
- Earl of March Secondary School, Ottawa
- Lennoxville, Quebec
- Richmond, Quebec
- Richmond County, Nova Scotia

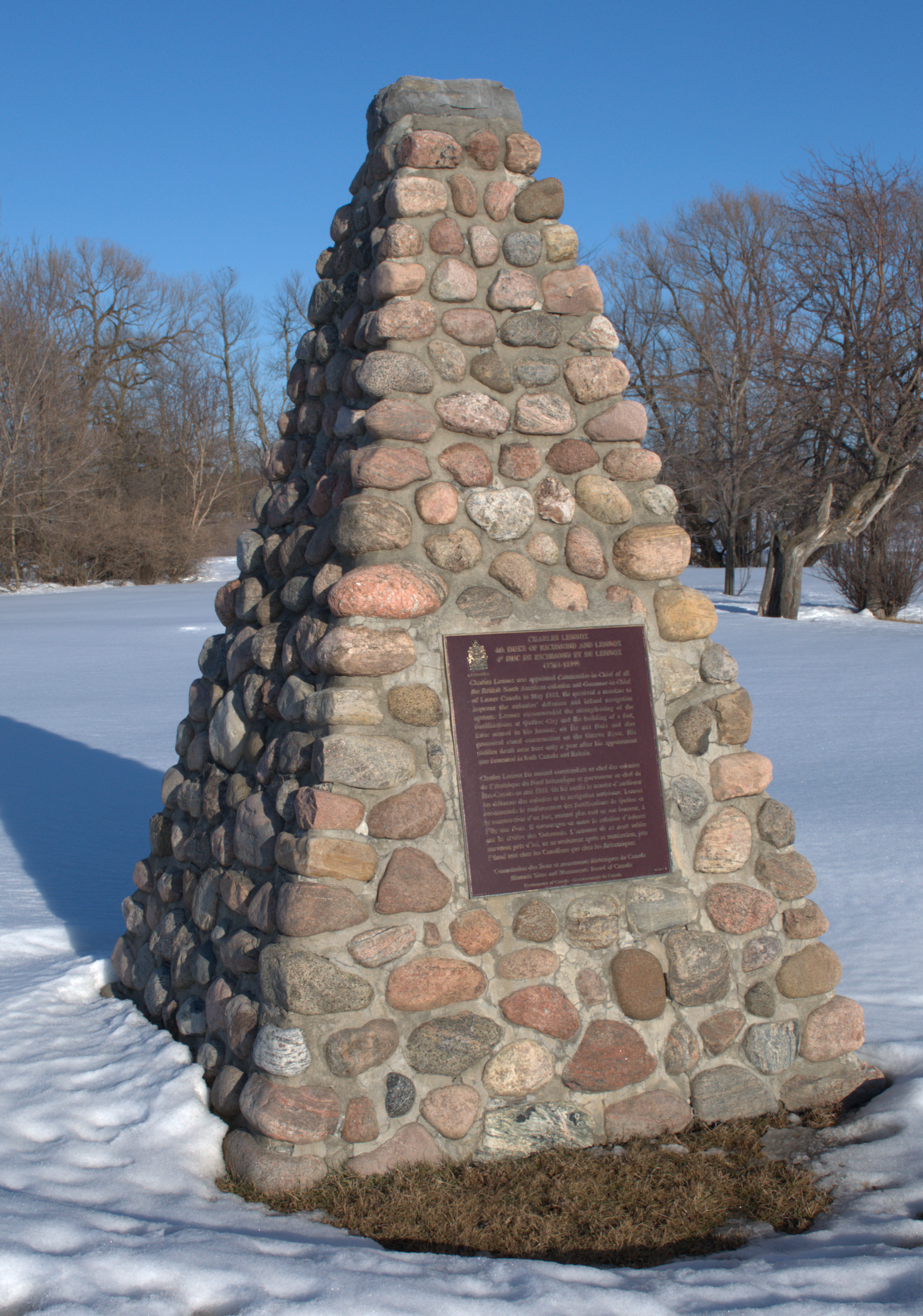
Cairn marking the approximate location of the 4th Duke's death

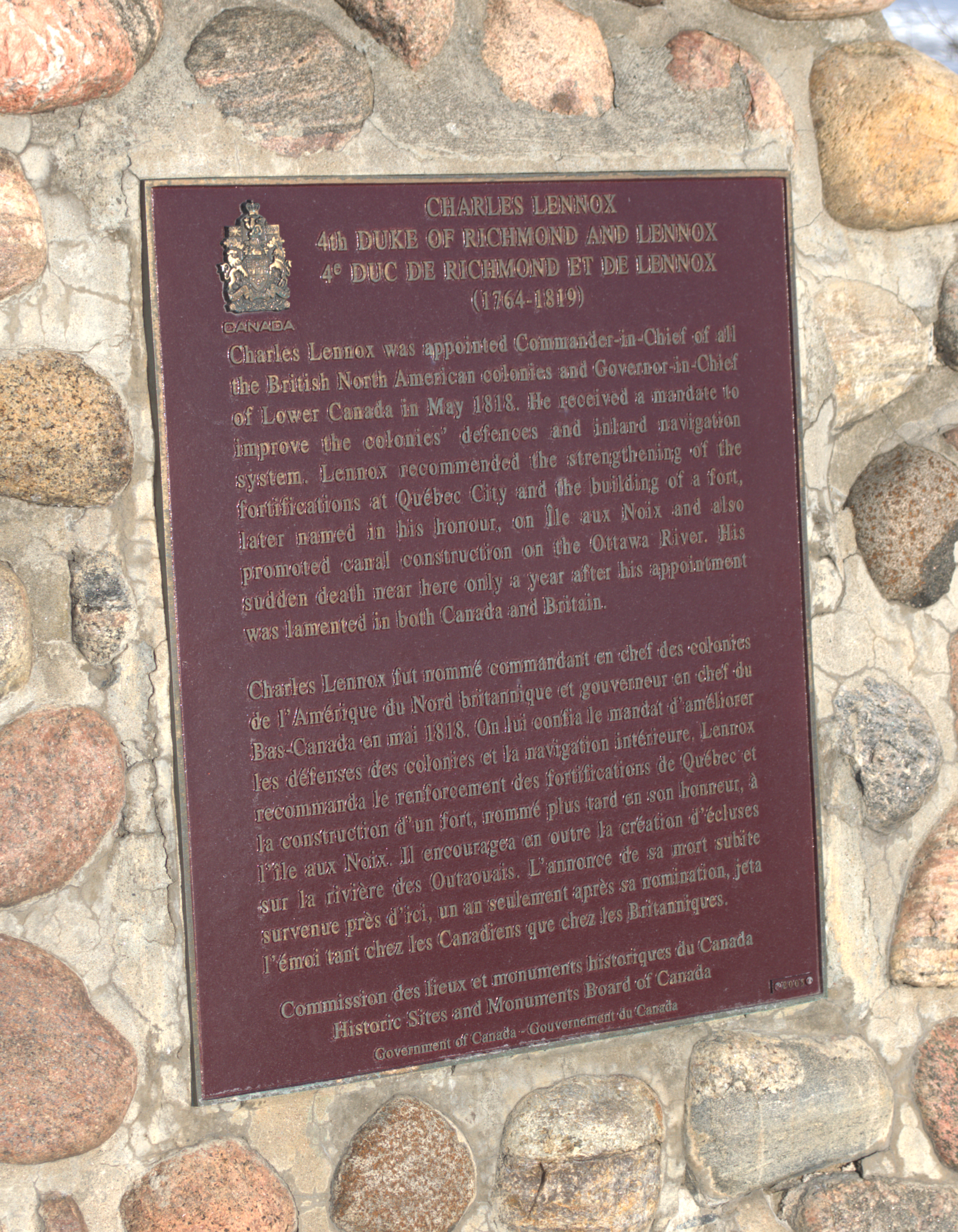
Plaque on the Duke of Richmond's cairn

In Ireland:

- Lennox Street, Dublin
- Richmond Barracks at Inchicore, Dublin
- Richmond Park, now home ground of St Patrick's Athletic F.C.

== Children ==
The Duke and Duchess had seven sons and seven daughters:

- Lady Mary Lennox (15 August 1790 – 7 December 1847), married Sir Charles Fitzroy and had issue.
- Charles Gordon-Lennox, 5th Duke of Richmond (3 August 1791 – 21 October 1860), married Lady Caroline Paget and had issue.
- Lt-Col. Lord John George Lennox (3 October 1793 – 10 November 1873), married Louisa Rodney and had issue.
- Lady Sarah Lennox (c. 1794 – 8 September 1873), scandalised her family by eloping after Waterloo with Waterloo hero, General Peregrine Maitland, 17 years her senior. The courtship had gone unnoticed by her family. The Duke of Wellington arranged for the couple to be married in Paris and fostered the family's ultimate acceptance of the marriage. They were the parents of Charles Maitland.
- Lady Georgiana Lennox (30 September 1795 – 15 December 1891), was a close friend of the Duke of Wellington, despite being 26 years younger than the Duke who referred to her as "dearest Georgy" in their many years of written correspondence. There are hints that the relationship may have been sexual, including his gift of a miniature to her on the eve of the Battle of Waterloo, and a pause in their written correspondence for ten years after Waterloo. She was also fond of Colonel Frederick Ponsonby whose recovery after Waterloo she fretted over. After she married William FitzGerald, 22nd Baron de Ros in l by whom she had issue (including Dudley FitzGerald-de Ros, 23rd Baron de Ros) she resumed corresponding with Wellington until his death 27 years later.
- Lord Henry Adam Lennox (6 September 1797 – 1812), fell overboard from HMS Blake and drowned.
- Lord William Lennox (20 September 1799 – 18 February 1881), married first Mary Ann Paton and second Ellen Smith; had issue by the latter.
- Lady Jane Lennox (c. 1800 – 27 March 1861), married Laurence Peel and had issue, including Charles Lennox Peel.
- Captain Lord Frederick Lennox (24 January 1801 – 25 October 1829).
- Lord Sussex Lennox (11 June 1802 – 12 April 1874), married Hon. Mary Lawless and had issue.
- Lady Louisa Maddelena Lennox (2 October 1803 – 2 March 1900), married the Rt Hon. William Tighe, and died without issue.
- Lady Charlotte Lennox (c. 1804 – 20 August 1833), married Maurice Berkeley, 1st Baron FitzHardinge of Bristol, and had issue.
- Lt-Col. Lord Arthur Lennox (2 October 1806 – 15 January 1864), married Adelaide Campbell and had issue.
- Lady Sophia Georgiana Lennox (21 July 1809 – 17 January 1902), married Lord Thomas Cecil, died without issue.

Parliament of Great Britain
Preceded by Lord George Henry Lennox; Lord Pelham	Member of Parliament for Sussex; 1790–1801; With: Lord Pelham	Succeeded by Parliament of the United Kingdom
Parliament of the United Kingdom
Preceded by Parliament of Great Britain	Member of Parliament for Sussex; 1801–1806; With: Lord Pelham 1801; John Fuller 1801–1806	Succeeded by John Fuller; The Hon. Charles Wyndham
Government offices
Preceded by The Duke of Bedford	Lord Lieutenant of Ireland; 1807–1813	Succeeded by The Viscount Whitworth
Preceded by Sir John Sherbrooke	Governor General of British North America; 1818–1819	Succeeded by The Earl of Dalhousie
Military offices
Preceded by Sir William Medows	Governor of Kingston-upon-Hull; 1813–1814	Succeeded by The Viscount Hill
Preceded by The Viscount Howe	Governor of Plymouth; 1814–1819	Succeeded by The Duke of Wellington
Honorary titles
Preceded by The Earl of Ashburnham	Vice-Admiral of Sussex; 1812–1819	Succeeded by The Earl of Egremont
Preceded by The Duke of Norfolk	Lord Lieutenant of Sussex; 1816–1819	Succeeded by The Earl of Egremont
Peerage of England
Preceded by Charles Lennox	Duke of Richmond; 3rd creation 1806–1819	Succeeded by Charles Gordon-Lennox
Peerage of Scotland
Preceded by Charles Lennox	Duke of Lennox; 2nd creation 1806–1819	Succeeded by Charles Gordon-Lennox
French nobility
Preceded by Charles Lennox	Duke of Aubigny; 1806–1819	Succeeded by Charles Gordon-Lennox
