= Mary Ann Paton =

Scottish vocalist (1802–1864)

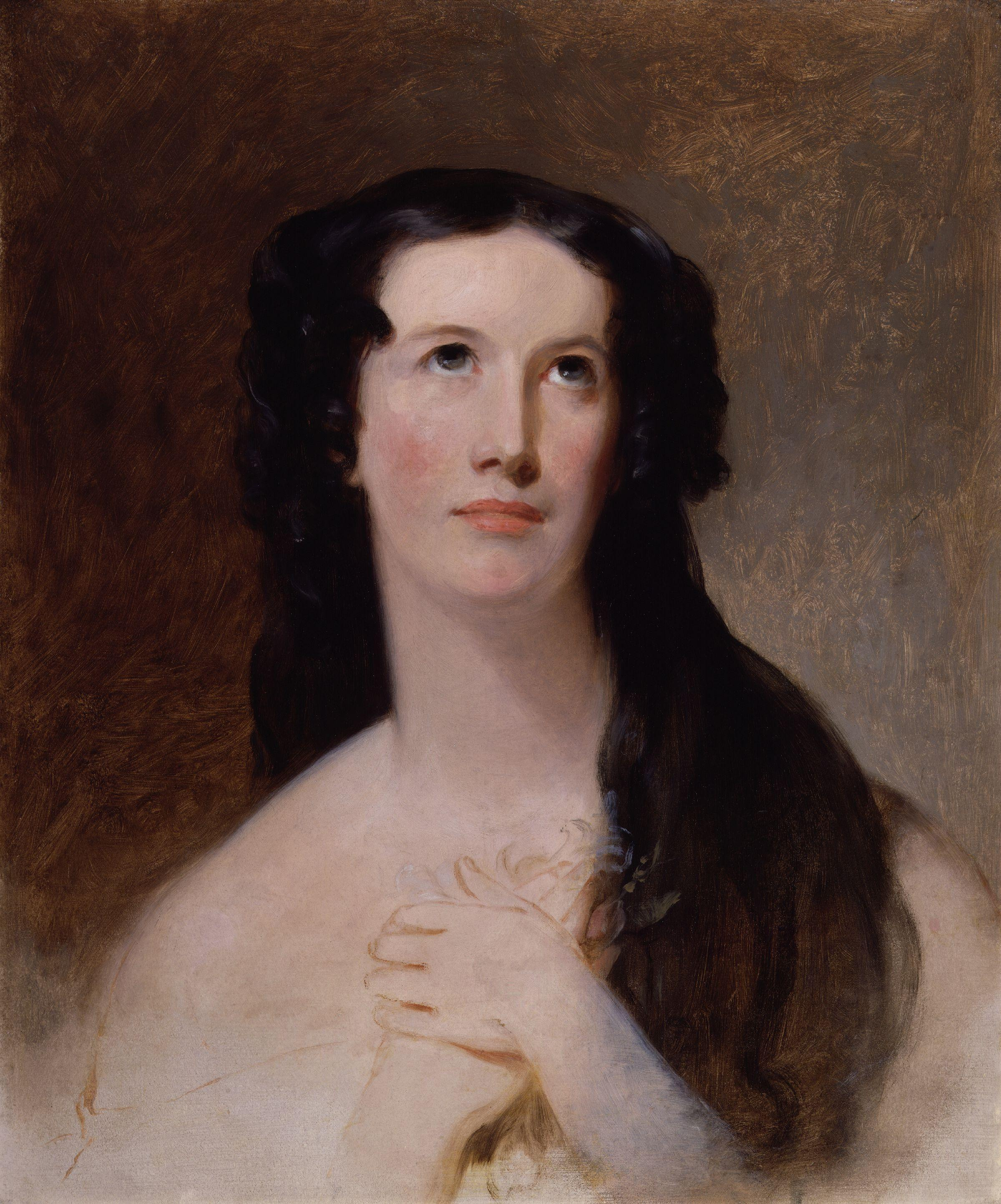
- Paton, 1836 portrait by Thomas Sully

Background information
- Also known as: Mary Ann Wood
- Born: October 1802; Edinburgh, Scotland
- Died: 21 July 1864 (aged 61) Yorkshire, England
- Genre: Opera
- Occupation: Vocalist

Mary Ann Paton (October 1802 – 21 July 1864), also known by her married name Mary Ann Wood, was a Scottish vocalist and opera singer.

== Early life ==
The eldest daughter of George Paton, a writing-master at Edinburgh and amateur violinist, and his wife, née Crawford, was born in Edinburgh in October 1802. She and her sisters received a good musical training. All three would become singers, with Isabella making her début at Mary Ann's benefit at Covent Garden Theatre, 1824, as Letitia Hardy, and Eliza sing at the Haymarket Theatre in 1833.

Mary Ann first appeared at public concerts aged eight, as a singer, performer on the harp, and on the pianoforte. She played (Giovanni Battista Viotti's concerto in G), and recited William Collins's Ode to the Passions and Alexander's Feast. The family settled in London in 1811, and she gave some concerts; but then took a break from performing. She had instrumental lessons from Samuel Webbe the younger, and, after six years, began a career as a vocalist, appearing in 1820 at Bath, and in 1821 at Huntingdon.

== On the London stage ==
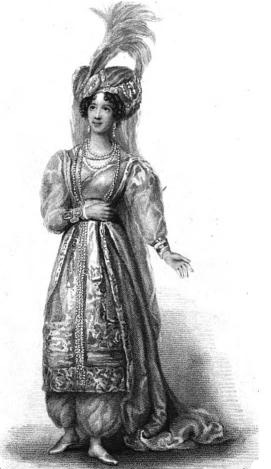
Mary Ann Paton as Mandane in Artaxerxes

In 1822, Paton joined the Haymarket company, and, on 3 August, debuted in the role of Susanna in Mozart's The Marriage of Figaro. After this critical success, she took the role of Countess Rosina in both Figaro and The Barber of Seville, as well as Lydia in Morning, Noon, and Night (George Frederick Perry), and Polly in the Beggar's Opera. She later moved to Covent Garden, playing Mandane in Artaxerxes, Rosetta in Love in a Village, Adriana in The Comedy of Errors, and Clara in The Duenna.

Paton's reputation as a dramatic singer grew when, in 1824, she took the part of Agatha in Der Freischütz, arranged by William Hawes. A major triumph for her was as Reiza in Oberon, for which its composer Carl Maria von Weber himself conducted the 16 rehearsals, as well as the performance on 12 April 1826, just two months before his death. From that time on, she was considered at the peak of her profession, being noted for the fluency and ornamentation of her singing. As a prima donna, she was largely responsible for the success of a number of adaptations of Rossini's operas in London during 1829–1830, even playing the same roles on the same nights as Maria Malibran.

In 1831, Paton transferred to the King's Theatre, where she continued to perform Rossini operas like La Cenerentola. At this time that she married tenor Joseph Wood, and her first billed appearance as Mrs. Wood was on 7 March 1831 at the Philharmonic Society Concert. In 1832, returning to Drury Lane, she took the part of Alice in Robert le diable, arranged by Henry Bishop.

== Later life ==
As Mrs. Wood, she and her husband went to live at Woolley Moor in Derbyshire. In 1840, they visited America for the first time. After their return, she retired to a convent for a year, after which both she and her husband reappeared at the Princess's Theatre and at concerts.

The Woods finally settled at Bullcliffe Hall, near Chapelthorpe in Yorkshire, and it was there that Mary Ann Wood died, on 21 July 1864, aged 62.

== Family ==
Early in her life, Paton had been engaged to a young medical student named Blood, who had briefly acted under the name of Davis. However, her father had seen to it that the engagement was broken off. On 7 May 1824, Paton married Lord William Pitt Lennox; they were divorced in the Scottish courts in 1831, and she married Joseph Wood the same year. She left a son, Robert Henry Wood, born in 1838.

== See also ==
- List of entertainers who married titled Britons
