= Charles Gordon-Lennox, 5th Duke of Richmond =

British peer, soldier and Conservative politician

His Grace The Duke of Richmond KG PC
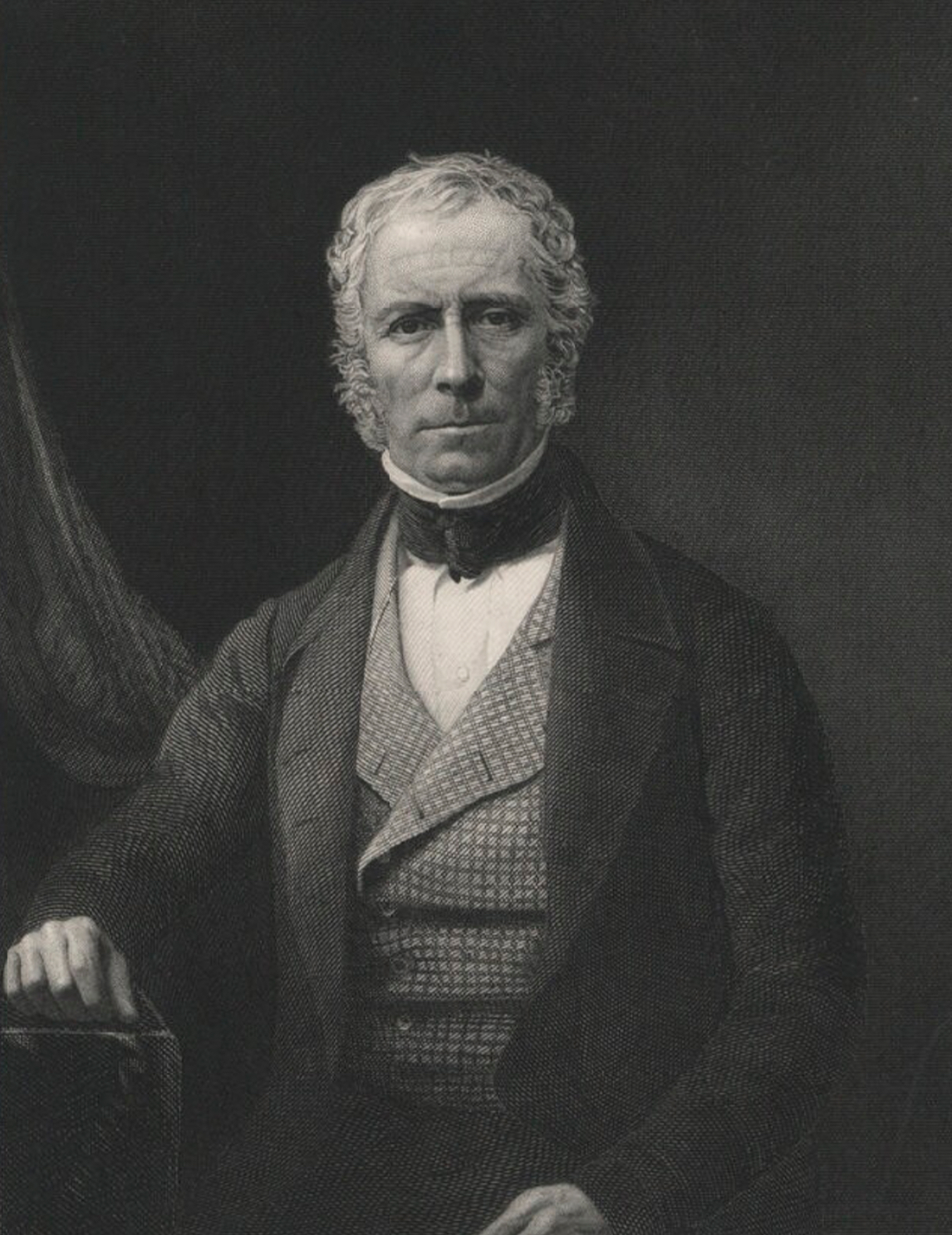
- Portrait by Antoine Claudet, c. 1860

Postmaster General
- In office 11 December 1830 – 5 July 1834
- Prime Minister: The Earl Grey
- Preceded by: The Duke of Manchester
- Succeeded by: The Marquess Conyngham

Member of the House of Lords Lord Temporal
- In office 28 August 1819 – 21 October 1860; Hereditary peerage
- Preceded by: The 4th Duke of Richmond
- Succeeded by: The 6th Duke of Richmond

Member of Parliament for Chichester
- In office 1812–1819
- Preceded by: George White-Thomas
- Succeeded by: Lord John Lennox

Personal details
- Born: Charles Lennox; 3 August 1791 Richmond House, Whitehall Gardens, London
- Died: 21 October 1860 (aged 69) Portland Place, Marylebone, London
- Party: Ultra-Tories
- Spouse: Lady Caroline Paget (1796–1874)
- Children: Charles Gordon-Lennox, 6th Duke of Richmond; Caroline Ponsonby, Countess of Bessborough; Lord Fitzroy Gordon-Lennox; Lord Henry Gordon-Lennox; Lord Alexander Gordon-Lennox; Augusta, Princess Edward of Saxe-Weimar; Lord George Gordon-Lennox; Cecilia Bingham, Countess of Lucan
- Parent(s): Charles Lennox, 4th Duke of Richmond; Lady Charlotte Gordon
- Education: Trinity College Dublin

Charles Gordon-Lennox, 5th Duke of Richmond, KG, PC (né Lennox; 3 August 1791 – 21 October 1860), styled the Earl of March from 1806 to 1819, was a Scottish peer, soldier and prominent Conservative politician. Upon the death of his uncle in 1836, he inherited the Gordon estates and per the terms of the bequest, adopted thus additional surname. His near-complete correspondence is now held at the West Sussex Archives.

== Early life ==
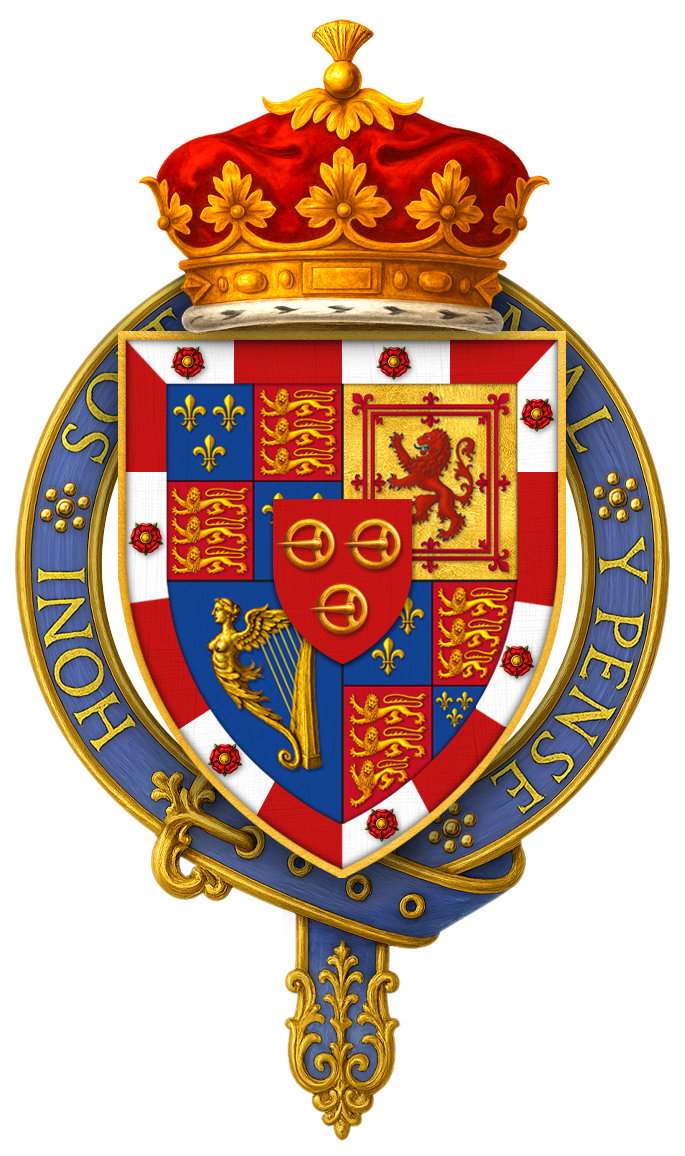
Garter-encircled arms of The 5th Duke of Richmond

Gordon-Lennox was born in 1791, the son and heir of Charles Lennox (1764–1819) by his wife, Lady Charlotte Gordon, the eldest child of Alexander Gordon, 4th Duke of Gordon. In 1806, his father inherited the Dukedom of Richmond from his uncle the third duke. From then until his father's death in 1819, Gordon-Lennox was styled Earl of March, a courtesy title, being one of his father's subsidiary titles.

Gordon-Lennox was educated at Westminster School in London and Trinity College Dublin. In 1836, on inheriting the estates of his childless maternal uncle George Gordon, 5th Duke of Gordon, he was required by the terms of the bequest to assume the surname of Gordon before that of Lennox; he duly took the surname Gordon-Lennox for himself and his issue, by royal licence dated 9 August 1836.

== Career ==
The Battle of the Pyrenees by John Singleton Copley, 1814. Richmond is shown to the right of the Duke of Wellington

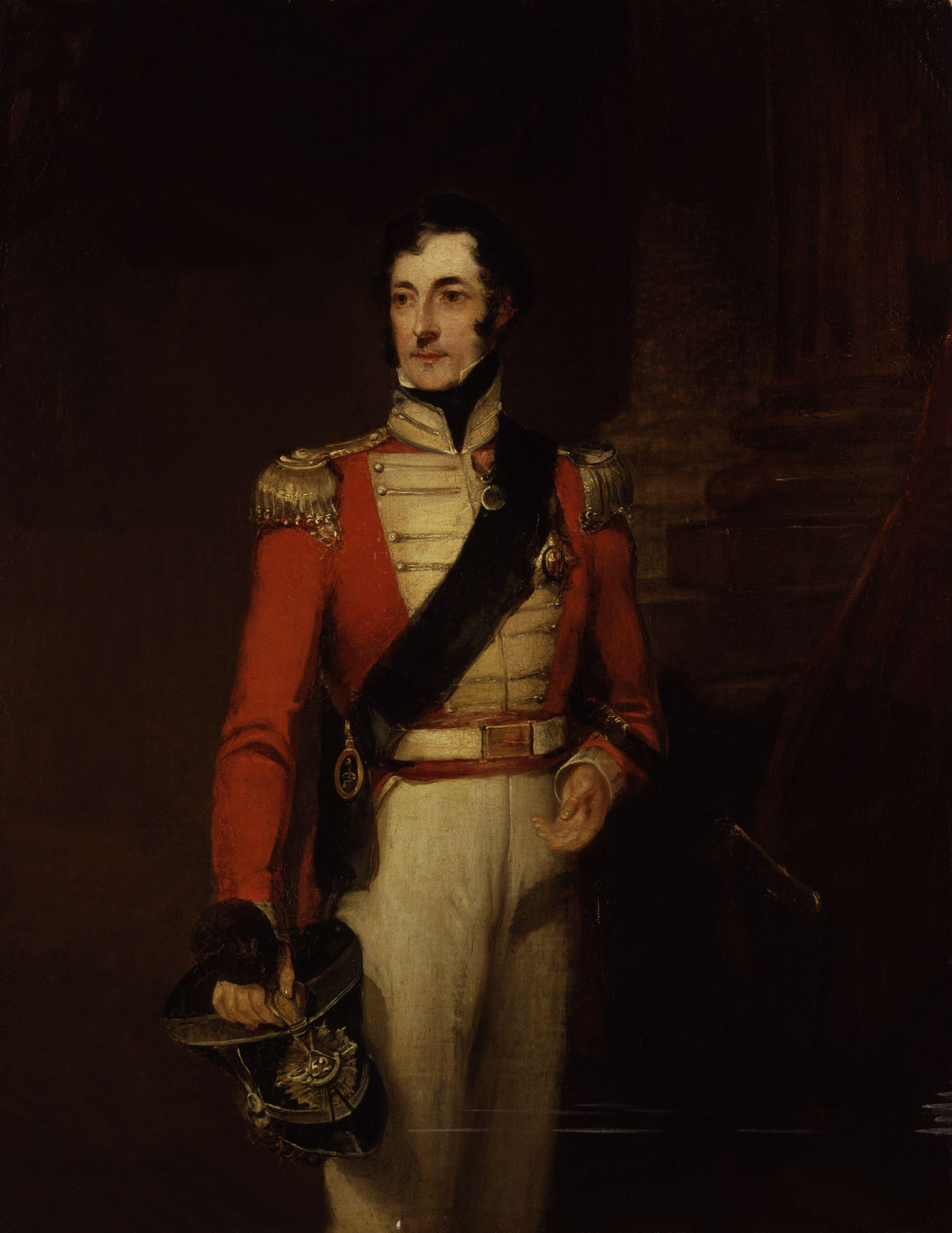
The Duke of Richmond, portrait by William Salter

As Earl of March, he served on Wellington's staff in the Peninsular War, during which time he volunteered to join the 52nd (Oxfordshire) Regiment of Foot's advance storming party on the fortress of Ciudad Rodrigo. He formally joined the 52nd Foot in 1813 and took command of a company of soldiers at the Battle of Orthez in 1814, where he was severely wounded; the musket-ball in his chest was never removed. During the Battle of Waterloo (1815) he was aide-de-camp to the Prince of Orange, and following the latter's wounding, served as aide-de-camp to Wellington. He was chiefly responsible for the institution in 1847 of the Military General Service Medal for all survivors of the campaigns between 1793 and 1814, considered by many belated as hitherto there had only been a Waterloo Medal. He campaigned in Parliament and enlisted the interest of Queen Victoria. Richmond himself received the medal with eight clasps.

On 19 October 1817, he reformed the Goodwood Troop of Yeomanry Artillery, originally raised by the 3rd Duke in 1797. The unit supported the cavalry of the Sussex Yeomanry but was disbanded in December 1827. Richmond was appointed Colonel of the Royal Sussex Light Infantry Militia on 4 December 1819, and Colonel-in-Chief of its offshoot the Royal Sussex Militia Artillery, on its formation in April 1853.

=== Political career ===
Richmond sat as a Member of Parliament for Chichester between 1812 and 1819. The latter year he succeeded his father in the dukedom and entered the House of Lords where he was a vehement opponent of Roman Catholic emancipation, and later was a leader of the opposition to Peel's free trade policy, as he was the president of the Central Agricultural Protection Society, which campaigned for the preservation of the Corn Laws. Although a vigorous Conservative and Ultra-Tory for most of his career, Richmond's anger with Wellington over Catholic Emancipation prompted him to lead the Ultras into joining Earl Grey's reforming Whig government in 1830 (Lang, 1999).

He served under Grey as Postmaster General between 1830 and 1834. He was sworn of the Privy Council in 1830, and in 1831 was appointed to serve on the Government Commission upon Emigration, which was wound up in 1832.

Richmond was Lord Lieutenant of Sussex between 1835 and 1860 and was appointed a Knight of the Garter in 1829.

== Personal life ==
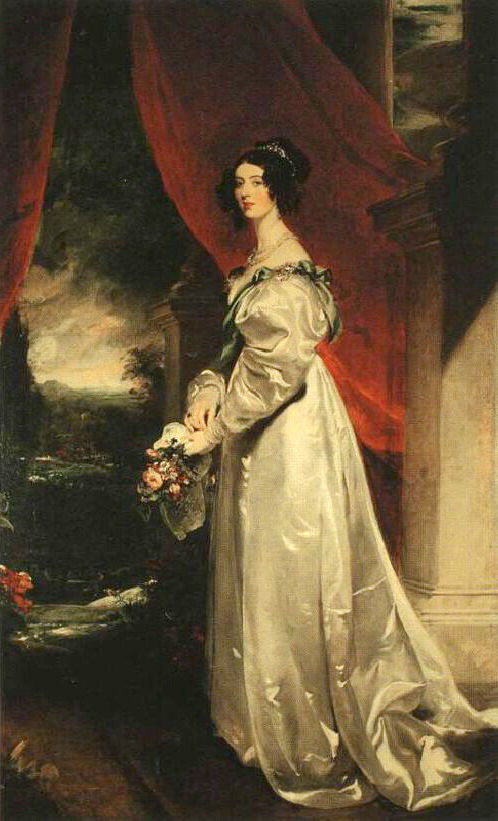
Caroline Paget, Duchess of Richmond by Thomas Lawrence, c. 1829

On 10 April 1817 he married Lady Caroline Paget (1797–1874), a daughter of Henry Paget, 1st Marquess of Anglesey by his wife Lady Caroline Villiers. Together, they were the parents of five sons and five daughters, including:

- Charles Gordon-Lennox, 6th Duke of Richmond (1818–1903), who married Frances Harriett Greville, daughter of Algernon Greville (the private secretary to the Duke of Wellington) and the former Charlotte Maria Cox, in 1843.
- Lady Caroline Amelia Gordon-Lennox (1819–1890), who married John Ponsonby, 5th Earl of Bessborough, the eldest son of John Ponsonby, 4th Earl of Bessborough, and Lady Maria Fane (a daughter of the 10th Earl of Westmorland).
- Lord Fitzroy George Charles Gordon-Lennox (1820–1841), lost at sea aboard SS President.
- Rt. Hon. Lord Henry Charles George Gordon-Lennox (1821–1886), MP for Chichester who served as First Secretary of the Admiralty and First Commissioner of Works; he married Amelia Susannah (née Smith, then Brooman), widow of John White, in 1883; he left no children.
- Captain Lord Alexander Francis Charles Gordon-Lennox (1825–1892), who married Emily Frances Towneley, daughter of Col. Charles Towneley, MP for Sligo, and Lady Caroline Molyneux (a daughter of the 2nd Earl of Sefton), in 1863; he left children.
- Lady Augusta Catherine Gordon-Lennox (1827–1904), who married Prince Edward of Saxe-Weimar, a son of Prince Bernhard of Saxe-Weimar-Eisenach and Princess Ida of Saxe-Meiningen (sister to Queen Adelaide, wife of King William IV).
- Lord George Charles Gordon-Lennox (1829–1877), MP for Lymington; he married Minnie (née Palmer) Cook, a daughter of William Henry Palmer and widow of Edwin Adolphus Cook, in 1875; he left no children.
- Lady Cecilia Catherine Gordon-Lennox (1838–1910), who married Charles Bingham, 4th Earl of Lucan, the eldest son of George Bingham, 3rd Earl of Lucan and Lady Anne Brudenell (a daughter of the 6th Earl of Cardigan). They were the parents of George Bingham, 5th Earl of Lucan, Cecil Bingham, Francis Bingham, and Rosalind Hamilton, Duchess of Abercorn.

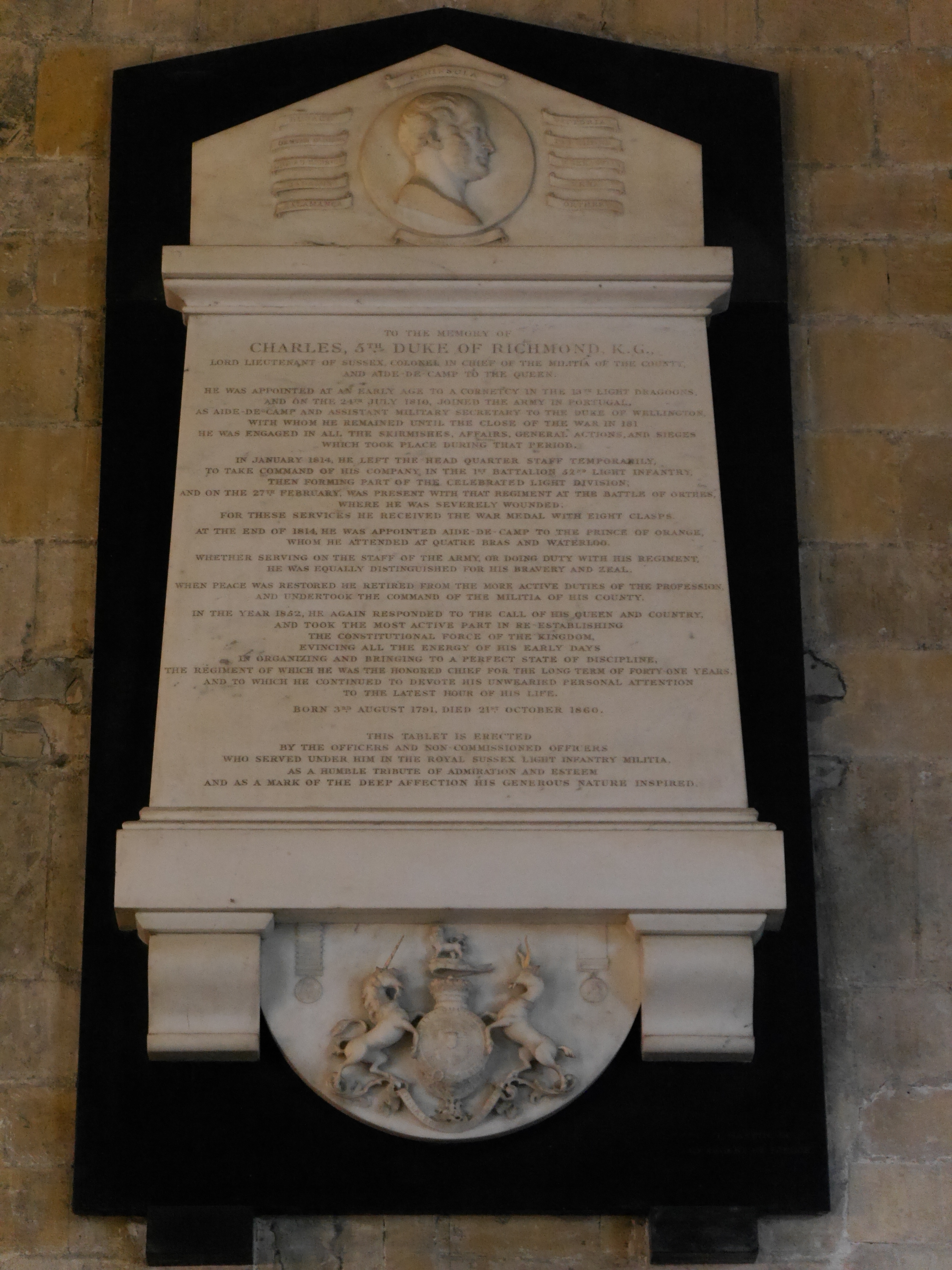
Monument to the 5th Duke of Richmond, Chichester Cathedral

The Duke died at Portland Place, Marylebone, London, in October 1860, aged 69 and was succeeded in the dukedom by his eldest son Charles.

=== Descendants ===
Through his youngest surviving daughter Cecilia, he is a direct ancestor of Diana, Princess of Wales, and of her sons, William, Prince of Wales, and Prince Harry, Duke of Sussex.

== See also ==
- Duchess of Richmond's Ball

Parliament of the United Kingdom
Preceded by George White-Thomas; James du Pre	Member of Parliament for Chichester; 1812–1819; With: William Huskisson	Succeeded by William Huskisson; Lord John Lennox
Political offices
Preceded by The Duke of Manchester	Postmaster General; 1830–1834	Succeeded by The Marquess Conyngham
Honorary titles
Preceded by The Earl of Egremont	Vice-Admiral of Sussex; 1831–1860	Vacant
Preceded by The Earl of Egremont	Lord Lieutenant of Sussex; 1835–1860	Succeeded by The Earl of Chichester
Peerage of England
Preceded by Charles Lennox	Duke of Richmond; 3rd creation 1819–1860	Succeeded by Charles Gordon-Lennox
Peerage of Scotland
Preceded by Charles Lennox	Duke of Lennox; 2nd creation 1819–1860	Succeeded by Charles Gordon-Lennox
French nobility
Preceded by Charles Lennox	Duke of Aubigny; 1819–1860	Succeeded by Charles Gordon-Lennox
