= Leconfield Hall =

Municipal building in Petworth, West Sussex, England

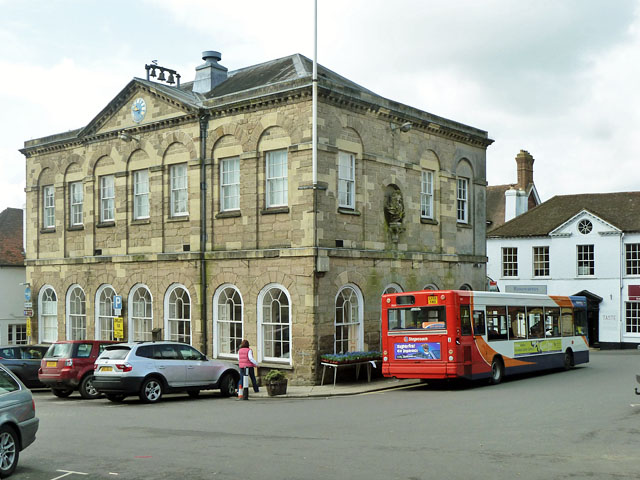
- Leconfield Hall in 2012

- Location within West Sussex

General information
- Architectural style: Neoclassical
- Location: Market Square, Petworth, West Sussex, England
- Coordinates: 50.9862°N 0.6101°W
- Year built: 1793

Listed Building – Grade II*
- Official name: The Town Hall
- Designated: 22 February 1955
- Reference no.: 1225590

Leconfield Hall, formerly Petworth Town Hall, is a municipal building in the Market Square in Petworth, West Sussex, England. The building, which is now used as a cinema, is a Grade II* listed building.

== History ==
The building was commissioned to replace a timber-framed market house which dated back at least to the 15th century. By the late 18th century, the old building had become dilapidated and the lord of the manor, George Wyndham, 3rd Earl of Egremont, whose seat was at Petworth House, decided to demolish the old building and replace it with a new structure on the same site. The new building was designed in the neoclassical style, built in ashlar stone and was completed in 1793.

The design involved a symmetrical main frontage with seven bays facing east onto the Market Square; it was arcaded on the ground floor, so that markets could be held, with an assembly hall on the first floor. The first floor was fenestrated with sash windows flanked by pilasters supporting voussoirs, and the central section of three bays, which slightly projected forward, was surmounted by a modillioned pediment with a clock in the tympanum. A bust of King William III on a pedestal (Note: King Wiiliam III briefly visited the town in 1704.) was created by French sculptor Honoré Pellé and installed in a niche on the north side of the building. The architectural historian Nikolaus Pevsner was impressed with the bust and described it as "one of the finest baroque sculptures in England".

In the 19th century, the arcading was infilled with round headed windows, and the building became known as Petworth Town Hall; at that time the assembly room on the first floor was used as a courthouse, while the ground floor was used as a store. The court room functioned as venue for the manorial court, the court leet, the quarter sessions and the petty sessions. Items in the ground floor store included the local horse-drawn fire engine; a fire bell for summoning the local firemen was placed on the top of the pediment. The building was extended to the rear in a similar style but with a rendered brick finish in 1870.

The musicologist Brian Trowell was one of the guests who spoke in the town hall as part of the celebrations for the launch of the first Petworth Festival in 1979.

A major programme of refurbishment works was carried out with financial support from a local artist, Gwenda Morgan, and from English Heritage in the 1990s. As part of the works, the bust of King William III was relocated to Petworth House for safe-keeping and replaced with a replica which was paid for by John Max Henry Scawen Wyndham, 7th Baron Leconfield, 2nd Baron Egremont. The former town hall became known as Leconfield Hall on recognition of the support from the Wyndham family. The works, which also included stone restoration, a new dance floor on the ground floor and sound-proofing on the first floor, were completed to allow the building to be re-opened on 1 January 2000.

A further programme of works, costing £250,000, was carried out in summer 2021. The works allowed the hall on the ground floor to function as an exhibition area while the hall on the first floor was fitted out as a cinema with raked seating; the cinema was re-opened with a performance of No Time to Die in September 2021.

== See also ==
- Grade II* listed buildings in West Sussex
