= Petworth =

Town in West Sussex, England

Coordinates: 50.986°N 0.609°W

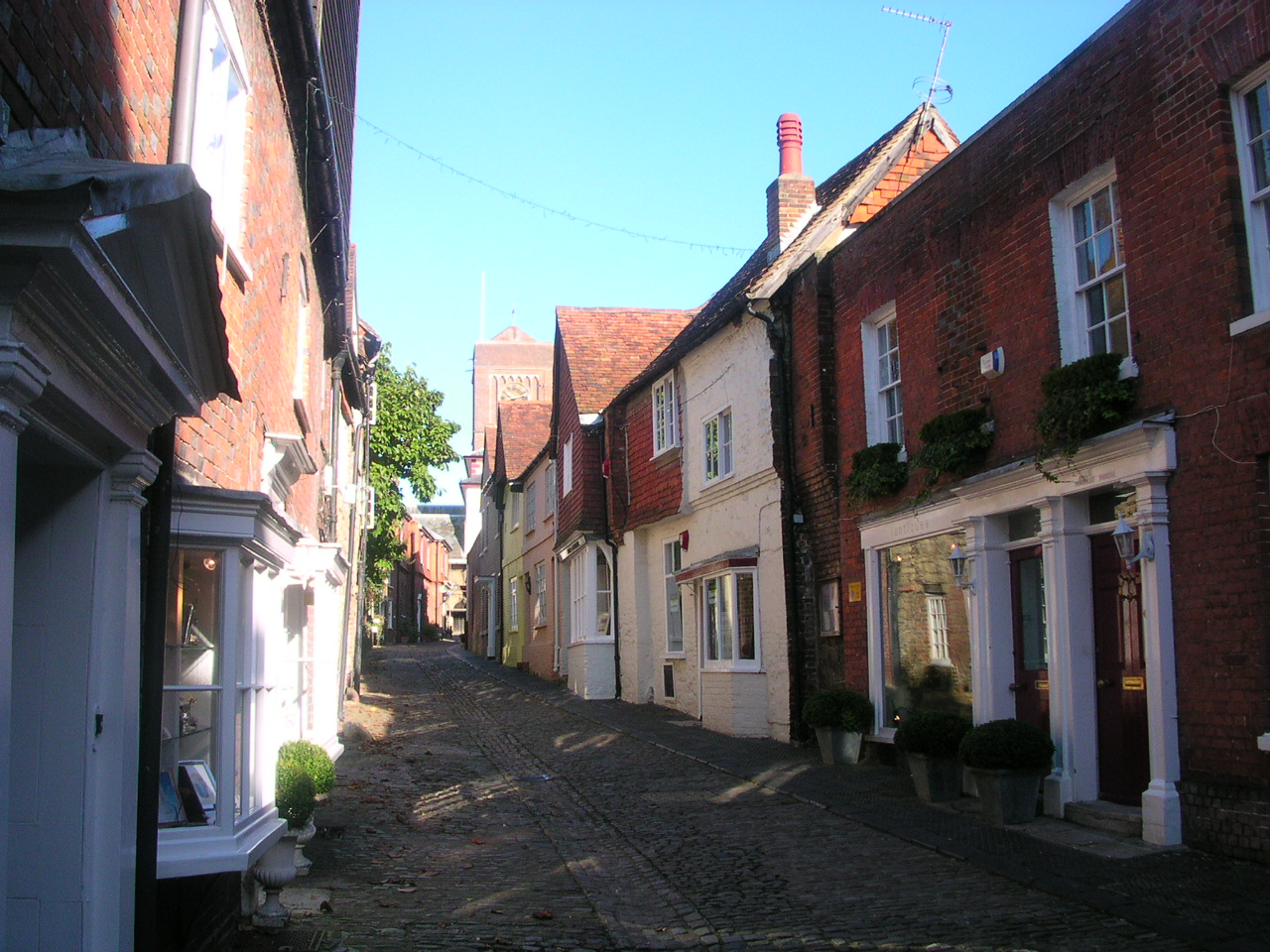
- Lombard Street looking towards St Mary's Church

- Location within West Sussex
- Area: 26.90 km^{2} (10.39 sq mi)
- Population: 3,027 (2011)
  - Density: 103/km^{2} (270/sq mi)
- OS grid reference: SU9721
  - London: 41 miles (66 km) NNE
- Civil parish: Petworth
- District: Chichester
- Shire county: West Sussex
- Region: South East
- Country: England
- Sovereign state: United Kingdom
- Post town: PETWORTH
- Postcode district: GU28
- Dialling code: 01798
- Police: Sussex
- Fire: West Sussex
- Ambulance: South East Coast
- UK Parliament: Arundel and South Downs

Petworth is a town and civil parish in the Chichester District of West Sussex, England. It is located at the junction of the A272 east–west road from Heathfield to Winchester and the A283 Milford to Shoreham-by-Sea road.

The parish includes the settlements of Byworth and Hampers Green and covers an area of 2,690 hectares (6,600 acres). Twelve miles (19 km) to the south west of Petworth along the A285 road lies Chichester and the south-coast. In 2001 the population of the parish was 2,775 persons living in 1,200 households of whom 1,326 were economically active. At the 2011 Census the population was 3,027.

== History ==
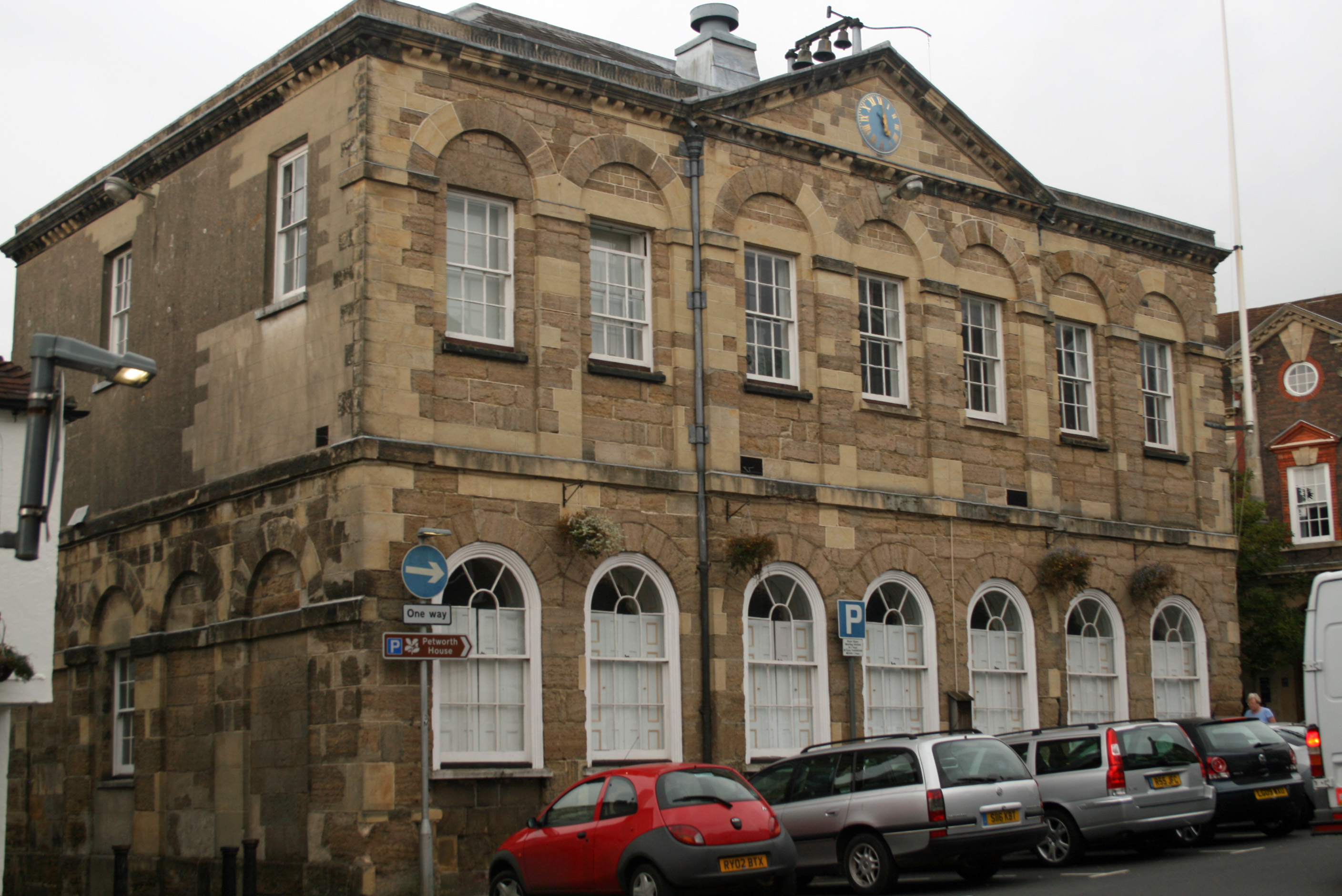
Leconfield Hall, which was formerly Petworth Town Hall

The name Petworth derives from the Old English pyttaworð or peotaworð meaning 'Pytta's' or 'Peota's enclosure'.

The town is mentioned in the Domesday Book of 1086 as having 44 households (24 villagers, 11 smallholders and nine slaves) with woodland and land for ploughing and pigs and 24 acres (9.7 ha) of meadows. At that time it was in the ancient hundred of Rotherbridge.

Petworth is the location of the 17th-century stately home Petworth House, the grounds of which (known as Petworth Park) were the work of Capability Brown. The house and its grounds are now owned and maintained by the National Trust.

In the early 17th century, the question of Petworth's status as an honour or a town came up when the Attorney General charged William Levett of Petworth, Gent., son of Anthony Levett, with "having unlawfully usurped divers privileges within the town of Petworth, which was parcel of the Honour of Arundel." William Levett's son Nicholas became rector of Westbourne, West Sussex. Leconfield Hall, which was formerly Petworth Town Hall, was completed in 1793.

Another historic attraction in the town, Petworth Cottage Museum in High Street, is a museum of domestic life for poor estate workers in the town in about 1910. At that time the cottage was the home of Mrs. Cummings, a seamstress, whose drunkard husband had been a farrier in the Royal Irish Hussars and on the Petworth estate.

Petworth fell victim to bombing in the Second World War on 29 September 1942, when a lone German Heinkel He 111, approaching from the south over Hoes Farm, aimed three bombs at Petworth House in whose grounds Canadian troops were encamped. The bombs missed the house, but one bounced off a tree and landed on the Petworth Boys' School in North Street, killing 28 boys, the headmaster, Charles Stevenson, and assistant teacher Charlotte Marshall.

== Governance ==
An electoral ward in the same name exists. This ward includes Fittleworth and Ebernoe with a total ward population as taken at the 2011 census of 4,742.

== Transport ==
The railway line between Pulborough and Midhurst once had a station at Petworth, but the line was closed to passenger use in 1955, and finally to freight in 1966, though the station building survives as a bed and breakfast establishment.

Public transport access is currently provided by an hourly bus between Midhurst and Worthing, operated by Stagecoach South.

== Education ==
Petworth Primary School is the only school in the town. The school is at the south of the town and takes pupils up until Year 6. Until 2008 the Herbert Shiner School took pupils in years 6, 7 and 8 before they moved on to Midhurst Grammar School but this closed when the new Midhurst Rother College was opened.

== Media ==
Local news and television programmes are provided by BBC South and ITV Meridian. Television signals are received from the Midhurst TV transmitter. Local radio stations are BBC Radio Sussex, Heart South, Greatest Hits Radio West Sussex, V2 Radio and Radio Kirdford, a community based station. The town is served by the local newspaper, Midhurst and Petworth Observer, which publishes on Thursdays.

== Culture ==
Petworth House was one of the main locations for the 2014 Mike Leigh film Mr. Turner, which put Timothy Spall as the artist Turner in the actual locations where he painted in the early 19th century.

The Petworth Society was founded in 1974 to protect the character and amenities of the parishes of Petworth and Byworth.

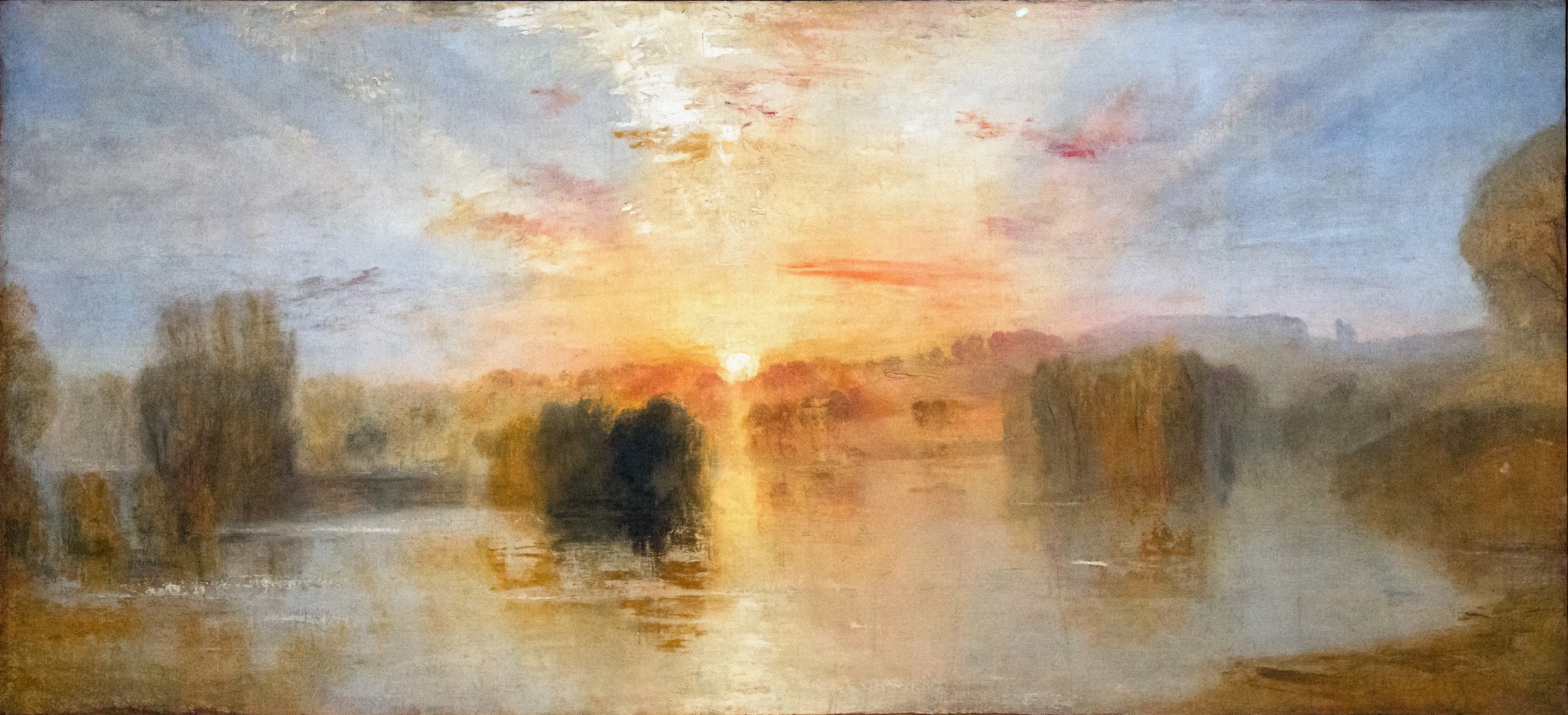
The Lake, Petworth, Sunset - J. M. W. Turner - Tate Britain

Newlands House Gallery, a gallery of modern and contemporary art, photography and design, opened in 2020.

== Petworth Fair ==
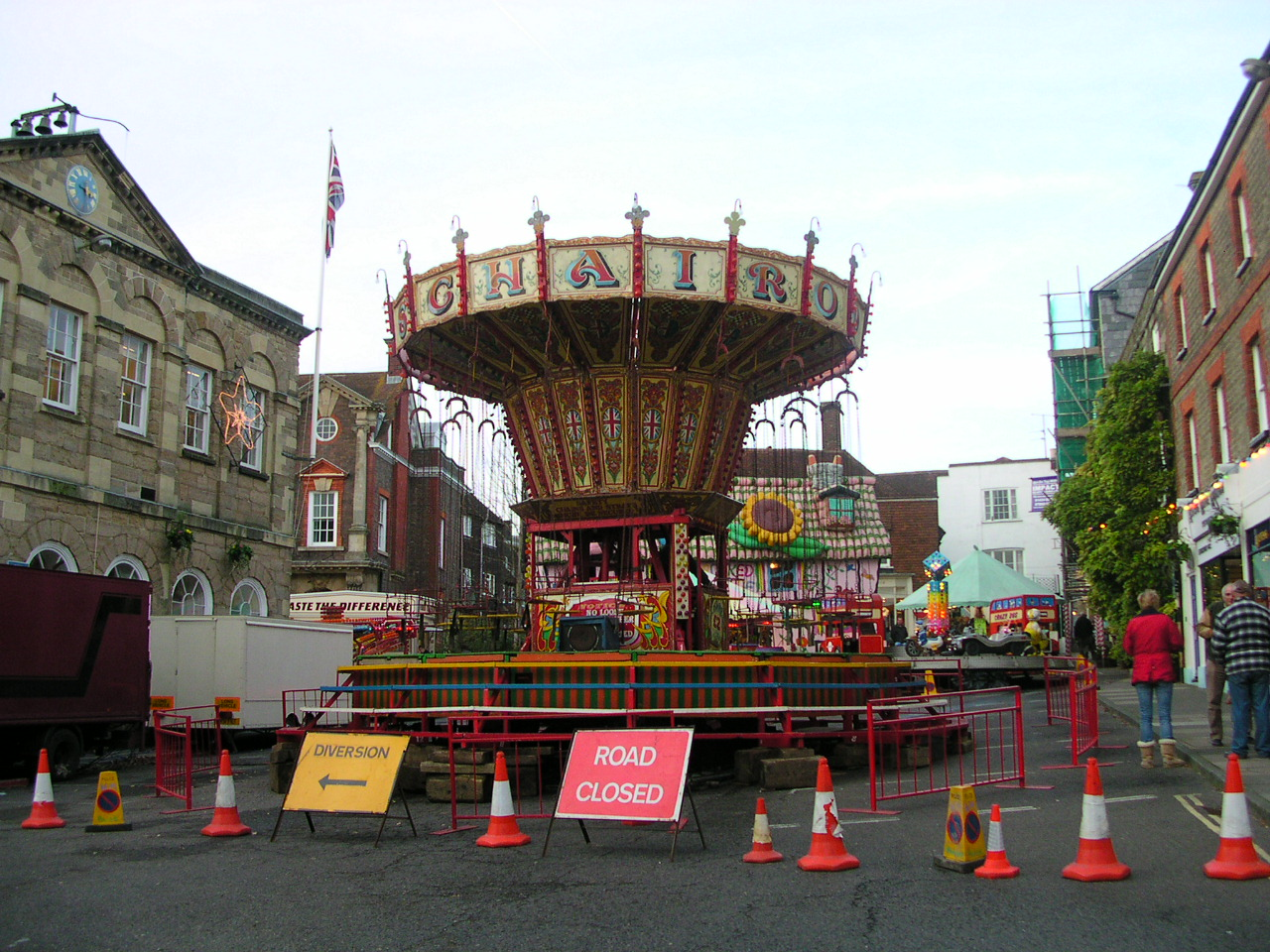
Petworth Fair

On 20 November (St. Edmund's day) each year, the market square is closed off to traffic so that a fun fair can be held. This is the modern survival of an ancient custom. In earlier centuries the fair lasted several days and may have been wholly or partly held on a field on the south side of the town called fairfield. The London Gazette of November 1666 announced that a fair would not be held that year because of plague still infesting the county, and shows that the fair was then a nine-day event.

Local tradition tells of a lost charter for the fair, but this is myth because it was determined by travelling justices of King Edward I in 1275 that the fair, then lasting eight days, had already been in existence since time immemorial and no royal charter was needed. At that time tolls on stalls for the sale of cattle provided an income for the Lord of the manor. The traders of Arundel claimed a right to sell their wares at the fair as Petworth was in the Honour of Arundel.

== Hamlets ==
The village of Byworth in the parish is just to the east of Petworth, across the Shimmings valley. Further east still, on the border with Fittleworth, is Egdean, which has a small church dedicated to St. Bartholomew.

== Twin towns ==
Petworth is twinned with Ranville in Normandy, France and San Quirico d'Orcia in Tuscany, Italy.

== Notable former residents ==
- Donal Morphy (1900–75), founder of Morphy Richards, lived at Byworth in his later years; his daughter Helen represented the area on West Sussex County Council throughout the 1980s

== See also ==
- Listed buildings in Petworth
