= Midhurst Grammar School =

Location
- North Street; Midhurst, West Sussex, GU29 9DT; England
- 50.9907°N 0.7371°W

Information
- Type: Voluntary Controlled Comprehensive Secondary
- Motto: Labor Omnia Vincit (Toil conquers all things)
- Religious affiliation: Church of England
- Established: 1672; 354 years ago
- Founder: Gilbert Hannam
- Closed: December 2008
- Local authority: West Sussex
- Specialist: Science College
- Department for Education URN: 126091 Tables
- Ofsted: Reports
- Gender: Mixed
- Age: 13 to 18
- Houses: Cowdray Hannam Lyell Wells
- Colours: Navy & Gold
- Former Pupils: Old Midhurstians

Midhurst Grammar School was a grammar school and later a comprehensive upper school in Midhurst, West Sussex, England. The school served pupils aged 11 to 18 who usually joined the school from one of the local intermediate schools. It was replaced in 2009 by Midhurst Rother College . Notable students included geologist Charles Lyell and H. G. Wells.

== History ==
A school was founded in Midhurst for poor boys in 1672 by local businessman Gilbert Hannam. Initially a school for just 12 pupils, it has varied in size over its 300-year history. The buildings were extended in 1821, but fell into disrepair, with the school closing in 1859. It was re-opened in 1880 as a boys' day and boarding grammar school. By 1944 it was classified as a Voluntary Controlled school, run by West Sussex County Council. Later, in 1956 the school became a mixed school, accepting girls for the first time. Falling pupil numbers, and the opening of the new Herbert Shiner secondary school in Petworth meant that in 1966 the school merged with the then Midhurst County Secondary School to form a comprehensive school, while retaining the historic name.

In 1970 local re-organisation saw the school change to become an upper school accepting pupils at age 13 (rather than 11). Younger pupils attended either Midhurst Intermediate School or the Herbert Shiner School in Petworth. Proposals were brought forward by the Local Education Authority in 2002 to revert to a two-tier structure in the area, which would have seen the Grammar School become an 11–18 school once again. However, this was opposed by the local community.

In February 2006 the school seriously failed in an Ofsted report and was put into the 'Special Measures' category. Following the first monitoring visit from Ofsted the former head teacher W.T. Benge resigned. Mr Peter May M.A. (Oxons) – Headteacher at The Weald School, Billingshurst was then appointed by the Local Authority as Executive Headteacher, with an Operational Headteacher, Jonathon Barrott, previously the Deputy Headteacher (who died on the evening of 12 February 2009 from pancreatic cancer), also in operation at the school.

The special measures required improved quality of teaching and pupil involvement in their own learning; improved behaviour of a minority of pupils; tracking and monitoring of pupil progress at Key Stage 4; and improved quality of leadership and management. An Ofsted report in July 2006 reported: 'Feedback shows that while satisfactory progress has been made in several areas, overall progress so far is not yet sufficiently good.'

In their September 2007 report, Ofsted reported that the school was being efficiently run with their value-added exam results proving to be well above the national average.

The school did eventually close in 2008 as part of a move to revert to two-tier provision, with a new academy replacing both the grammar school and the intermediate schools under the name of Midhurst Rother College.

== Head Teachers ==
- 1799 Rev. John Wooll
- 1807 Rev. William Bayly
- 1822 Rev. Cecil James Greene
- 1879 Horace Byatt
- 1903 Thomas Hay
- 1909 A.C. Maples
- 1918 Rev. Bernard Heald
- 1938 N.B.C. Lucas
- 1967 D. Fisher
- 1972 Mrs. V.M.Stempson (acting)
- 1973 Miss M.P. Evans
- 1983 E.E. Hickford
- 2001 W.T. Benge
- 2006 J.R. Barrott

== Campus ==
The school was based on an unusual campus in the north of the town, after several changes in recent years. Various buildings are spread over a disparate site. Lucas House was added to the school's property in 1997, with a new extension added in 1999, and a further Sports Complex developed in 2006. The campus remains in use for the academy.

== Curriculum ==
The school was made a specialist Science College in 2004, due to new laboratories and facilities within the science department. However, its pupils followed the National Curriculum in Years 9, 10 and 11. The school was the only 13-18 comprehensive school in the Local Authority, with pupils taking the Year 9 National Curriculum Tests just 8 months after joining the school from one of the local intermediate schools.

A level and BTEC courses were offered in a variety of fields.

== Academy replacement ==
The school grounds (and temporarily the buildings) are to be used for a new school with academy status. The local authority brought forward proposals in tandem with a consultation on amending the age of transfer in the area. This led to a new academy school opening in the town, taking pupils from the age of 11.

There was considerable opposition to the plans, and a group of local citizens of the Rother Valley, including many former and current students, formally questioned the plans for various reasons and questioned the fairness of the consultation procedure, citing a "rushed process", particularly considering length of Midhurst Grammar School's history.

Midhurst Grammar School closed on 19 December 2008, with a ceremony taking place in the former River Site Hall. Its replacement, Midhurst Rother College, opened in January 2009. The new buildings of Midhurst Rother College will be sited on the river site; work started at the end of 2010 and was due to be completed in autumn 2012.

== Old Midhurstians ==
Midhurst Grammar School alumni are known as 'Old Midhurstians', including:

- Sam Callis – Actor
- Seth Cardew – Studio potter
- John Gittings – Sinologist
- Field Marshal Sir Frederick Haines – British and Madras Army officer
- Charles Lyell – Geologist
- Peter Jerrome – Historian
- Dan Pearson – Garden designer and television presenter
- Mick Robertson – Children's television presenter
- Mark Rowland – Athlete
- Ian Serraillier – Author
- Nick Talbot – Molecular geneticist
- H. G. Wells – Author
- Cllr Tom Coles – Lord Mayor of Portsmouth (2023–24)

== Related publications ==
- An Experience of Teaching N.B.C. Lucas (1975) ISBN 978-0297769705 (A former headmaster recalls 30 years work in a unique school community)
