= Petworth Cottage Museum =

Coordinates: 50°59′08″N 0°36′27″W

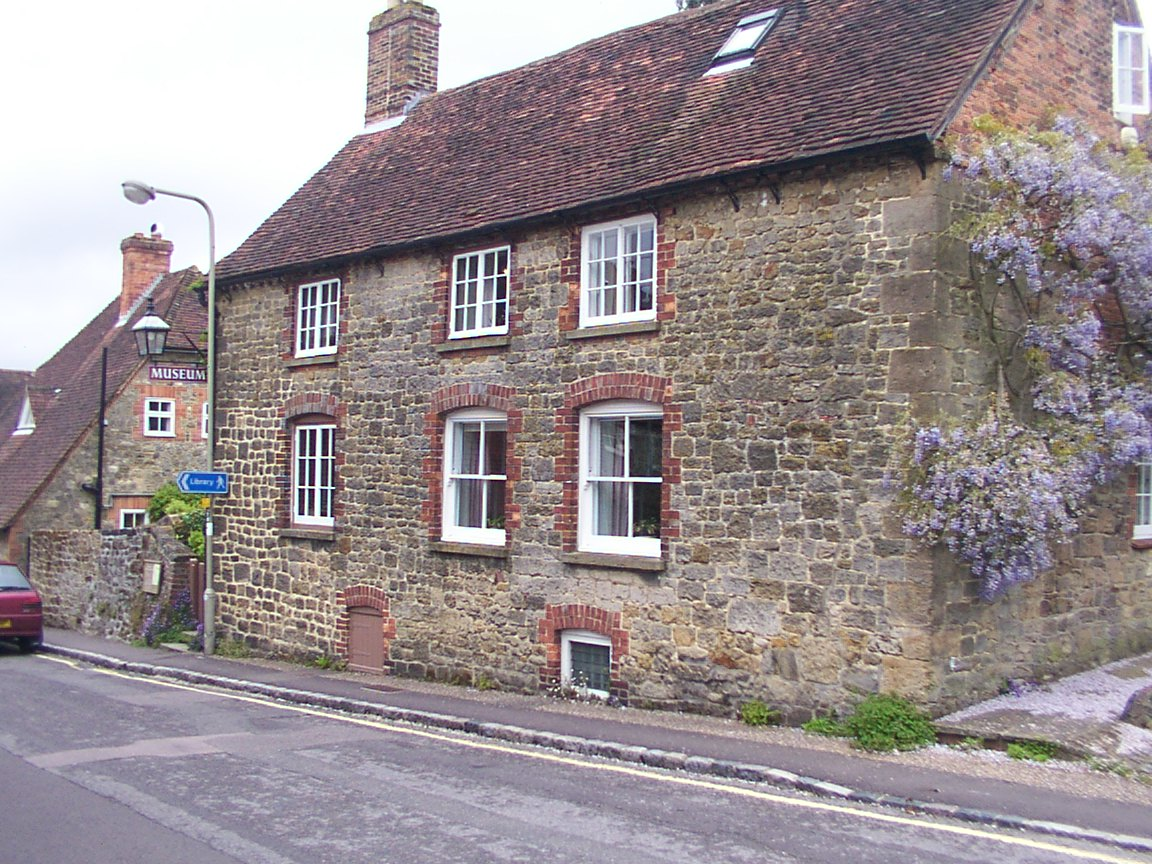

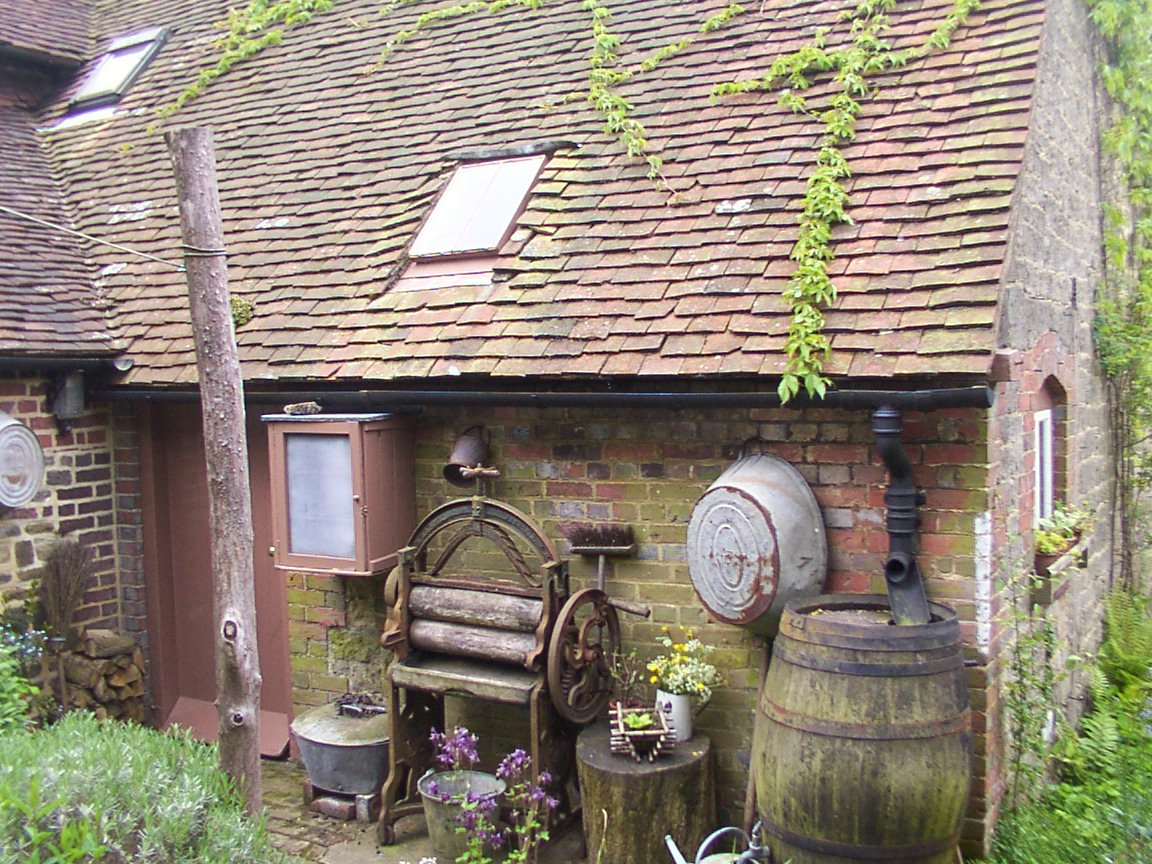

Petworth Cottage Museum, at 346 High Street, Petworth, West Sussex is a Leconfield Estate worker's cottage. It has been restored and furnished as it might have been in about 1910 when the occupier was a Mrs. Mary Cummings, an Irish Catholic. Mary worked as a seamstress at nearby Petworth House and at home. The collection also includes two oil on canvas paintings by an unknown artist. These show an exterior and an interior view of Petworth Gaol, or House of Correction, in the 1860s.

The museum was opened by Lord and Lady Egremont in May 1996 and is run by an independent charitable trust, the Petworth Cottage Trust. Volunteer staff provide information and guided tours.
