= Midhurst Intermediate School =

Location
- Wheelbarrow Castle; Midhurst, West Sussex, GU29 9AG; England; 50.9984°N 0.7289°W

Information
- Type: comprehensive middle school
- Motto: Achievement Community Enrichment
- Established: 1970
- Closed: December 2008
- Local authority: West Sussex County Council
- Department for Education URN: 126077 Tables
- Ofsted: Reports
- Gender: Mixed
- Age: 10 to 13
- Colour: Red
- Website: http://www.midhurst-int.w-sussex.sch.uk/

Midhurst Intermediate School was a maintained comprehensive middle school for pupils aged 10 to 13. It was one of only 11 schools of its type, and the only school in the United Kingdom to be labelled as 'intermediate'. It catered for around 400 pupils. The school was located just outside Midhurst in the village of Easebourne.

== History ==
The school was opened by West Sussex County Council in 1970 as a purpose-built middle school serving Midhurst, Easebourne and the surrounding communities.

In 2002, consultations were undertaken to review provision in the area to revert to the more usual two-tier structure of education. However, a parental ballot demonstrated clear support for the existing arrangements, and the status quo emerged as the preferred option.

Consultation began again in 2007, with the local authority proposing once again to amend provision to provide an age of transfer of 11 between local primaries and the secondary school in Midhurst. Accordingly, the school closed in December 2008 as pupils transferred to the new Midhurst Rother College.

== Organisation ==
Pupils in the school were organised into three year groups, aligned to the National Curriculum years of Year 6, Year 7 and Year 8. Pupils were taught mainly by specialist teachers as in secondary schools, although pupils in the first year of the school were in Key Stage 2.

Pupils transferred to the school from approximately 10 feeder primary schools from Midhurst and surround villages. Almost all pupils transferred at the end of Year 8 into Year 9 at the nearby Midhurst Grammar School
