= Petworth House Chapel =

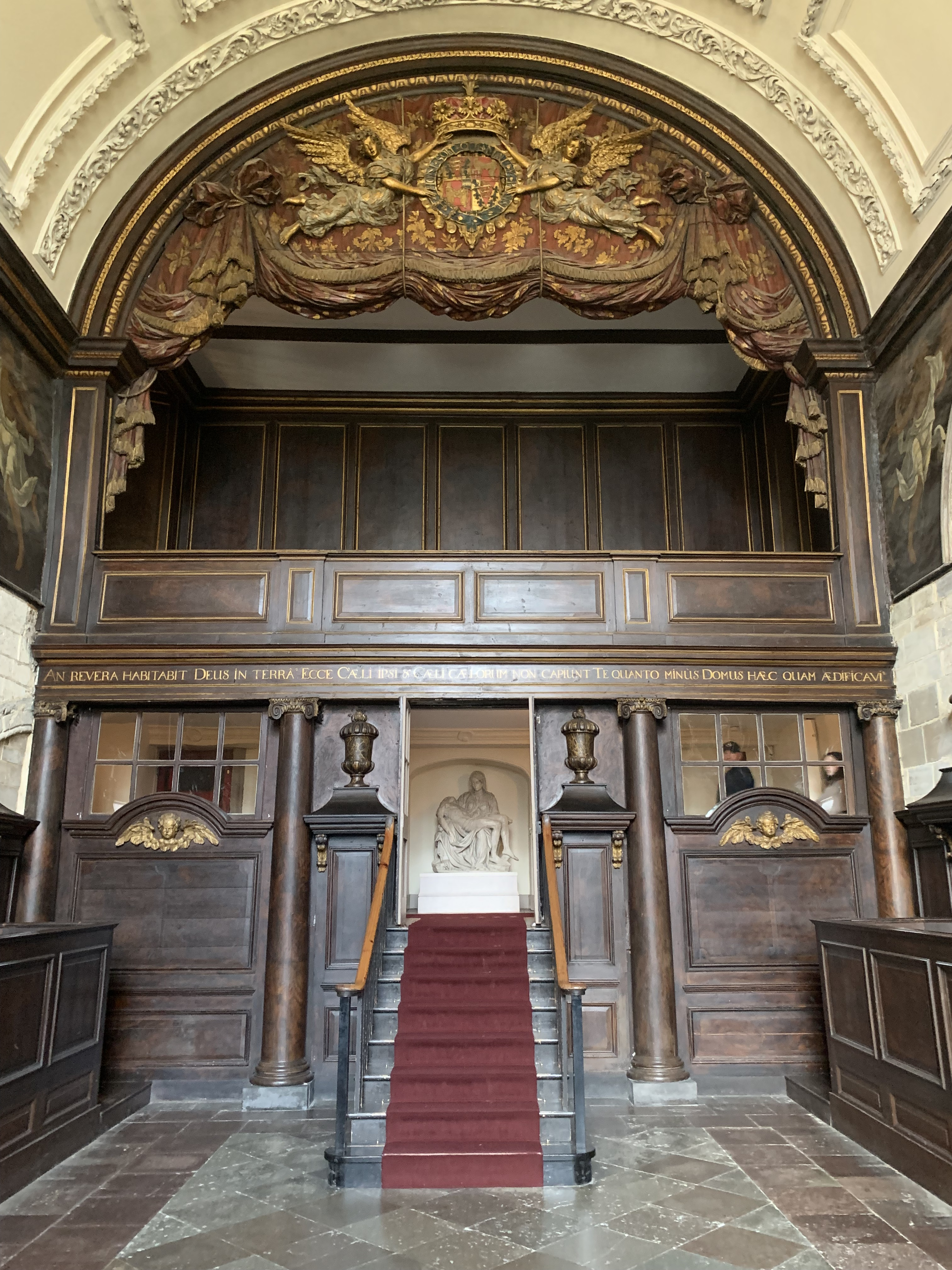
- Interior of Petworth House Chapel, Petworth House
- Location: Petworth House, West Sussex
- Country: England
- Denomination: Church of England

Architecture
- Heritage designation: Grade I listed
- Style: Medieval, with Baroque additions
- Years built: Early 14th century (parts); later alterations 17th century onward

Petworth House Chapel is the historic chapel incorporated into Petworth House in Petworth, West Sussex, England. The chapel represents one of the oldest surviving parts of the house complex and has medieval origins that were later altered and integrated into the larger country house fabric. The house and its associated structures are in the care of the National Trust.

== History ==
=== 14th Century origins ===
The chapel at Petworth is thought to date from the early 14th century and formed part of an earlier manor house on the site; the first Baron Percy was granted a licence to crenellate in 1309. Elements of the medieval chapel and undercroft were retained when later rebuilding works were carried out as the house evolved through the Tudor and Stuart periods. The chapel also retains some rare examples of 16 Century stained glass, bearing the arms of the Percy family.

=== 17th Century ===
During the late 17th century Petworth House was rebuilt and expanded by Charles Seymour, 6th Duke of Somerset, known as "The Proud Duke", and the older chapel fabric was incorporated into the new building. New additions included the carved curtain and the carved cherubs' heads. The chapel includes wood carving by John Seldon, an assistant to Grinling Gibbons.

Subsequent alterations to the house and chapel continued into the 18th and 19th centuries as the estate passed through the Seymour, Percy and Wyndham families.

=== 20th Century ===
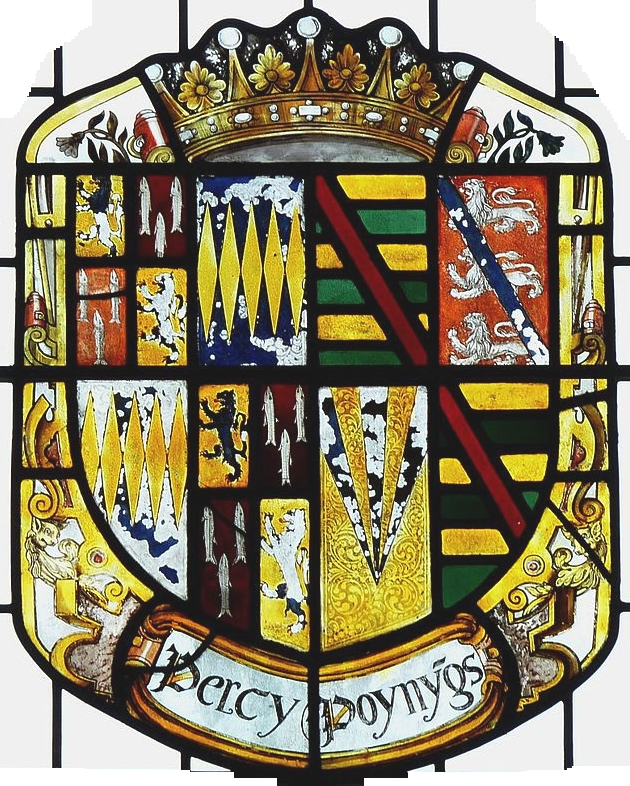
16th century stained glass in the Percy Window at Petworth House Chapel, depicting arms of Henry Percy, 3rd Earl of Northumberland (1421–1461) impaling the arms of the Poynings, his wife's family

Petworth House, including the chapel, became a Grade I listed building on 22 February 1955. Today Petworth House and the Chapel are managed by the National Trust.

== Petworth House Chapel today ==
The chapel forms part of the historic house complex overseen by the National Trust, and is open to visitors during normal National Trust opening hours.

== See also ==
- Petworth House
- Grade I listed buildings in West Sussex
