= Ben Harms =

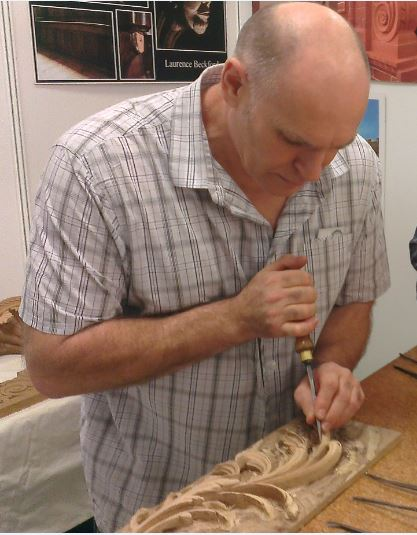
Ben Harms

Ben Harms (January 1955 – December 2021) was a German-born traditional woodcarver working in England. Some of his work can be seen at The Tower of London, Windsor Castle, Kensington Palace, Hampton Court and alongside the work of Grinling Gibbons at Petworth House.

== Life and career ==
Harms was born in West Germany. He came to England in 1968 and took an apprenticeship with Eke and Gonzalez, where he began his woodcarving career. He then joined Trollop And Coles. He later joined forces with Ray Gonzalez to form Gonzalez and Harms. From then on the two mastered the arts of traditional woodcarving and gilding.

Carved horses in the Tower of London

One of Harms' first major commissions, after he and Ray Gonzalez had formed their partnership, was the restoration of three carved full-size horses at the Tower of London; the horses are displayed in the armoury. Harms' early works can also be seen at Cambridge University in Emmanuel College Chapel, where extensive gilding work was undertaken.

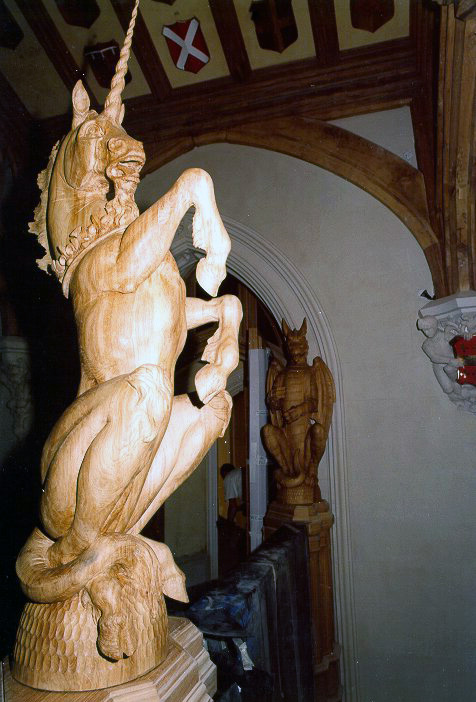
Queen's beast (a unicorn) at Windsor Castle

Carving at Petworth House

During the restoration work at Windsor Castle after the fire, Gonzalez and Harms carved the four Queen's Beasts which were totally destroyed in the fire which began in the Queen's private chapel. They were totally recarved as close to the originals as possible.

Uppark, a stately home in West Sussex was gutted by fire in 1989, and restored in 1994 in the National Trust's largest renovation project. Harms and Alan Lamb were turned "into latter-day versions of Grinling Gibbons, the most famous woodcarver in England's history", when they carved a new version of the winding fruitwood serpent on one of the saloon doors.

Uppark

Harms also sculpted in wood, stone, or clay. In 2000, Gonzalez and Harms created four large bronze panels to be placed in the entrance lobby for the newly created liner, RMS Queen Mary II. Each panel depicted a different scene from around the world, including Africa, Europe, South America and North America. During the sculpting of the North American panel, Harms depicted the statue of liberty with a small satellite dish standing at the bottom. Beside the satellite dish is depicted Homer Simpson, who has run a wire from the satellite dish into his TV in an attempt to obtain free cable.

G&H Studios recreated a substantial amount of a carved trophy for the refurbished British galleries, which opened in the Victoria and Albert Museum in 2001. The workshop was visited at this time by Greg Peters, 2000 Churchill Fellow of The Winston Churchill Memorial Trust of Australia.

In 2003, Gonzalez & Harms carried out work for the restoration of Christ Church, Spitalfields, involving thirty-eight existing carved oak brackets with repair work, and eleven brackets to be newly made; and above the brackets corniced mouldings which they also carved.

Harms made bronze-like panels and statues for the Victoria Palace Theatre, the Royal Gardens of Dubai, and Windsor Castle. He was involved in restoration at Kensington Palace, the Music Rooms at The V&A, The Entrance Hall at The Royal Academy, The Tower of London and Petworth House.

Harms is included in The Complete Book of Woodworking: An Illustrated Guide to Tools and Techniques by Declan O'Donoghue (2003).

As a member of the firm Gonzalez & Harms is one of 26 Full and Associate Members of The Master Carvers Association. Harms was the president of The MCA and came to office in December 2008 till 2011 where he became vice president till 2014 and remained on the board of The Master Carvers Association until his death. Harms also tutored at West Dean College

Ben Harms and G&H Studios in 2009 carved the King's Beasts for the newly restored Chapel Court Garden at Hampton Court for the celebration of King Henry VIII's 500th anniversary of his accession to the throne. The beasts were originally standing in the garden and throughout the palace including the moat bridge. They were originally created on commission by the king to celebrate his marriage to Jane Seymour in 1536. They were all destroyed in the reign of King William III. Several beasts were recarved and mounted along the moat bridge in 1911 but were not painted as they were originally. In 2009, Patrick Baty was commissioned to investigate the original beasts and colours. The carvings and colours were recreated from existing paintings of the garden. Harms worked closely with acclaimed landscape architect Todd Longstaffe-Gowan to restore the gardens to their former glory.

Ben and G&H Studios have just completed work at Strawberry Hill House in Twickenham, and St Peter's Catholic Church in Gloucester. Harms continued to produce carvings across the world but also started a studio dedicated to his second love, Kenpo Karate. Along with his son Steve Harms, he opened Kenpo Uk taking part in events such as the world LTKKA championships in Dublin. Harms was a second-degree black belt and so is Steve. Harms also opened a site for his kenpo at www.kenpouk.com.

== Gallery ==
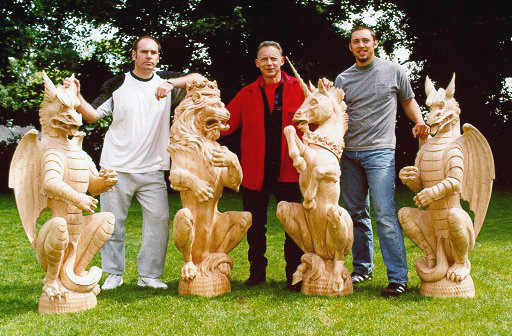
Queens Beasts

RMS Queen Mary 2

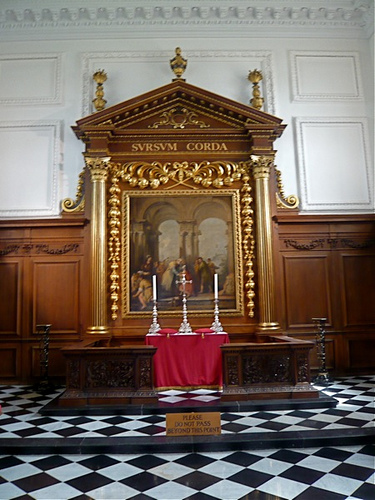
Emmanuel College, Cambridge

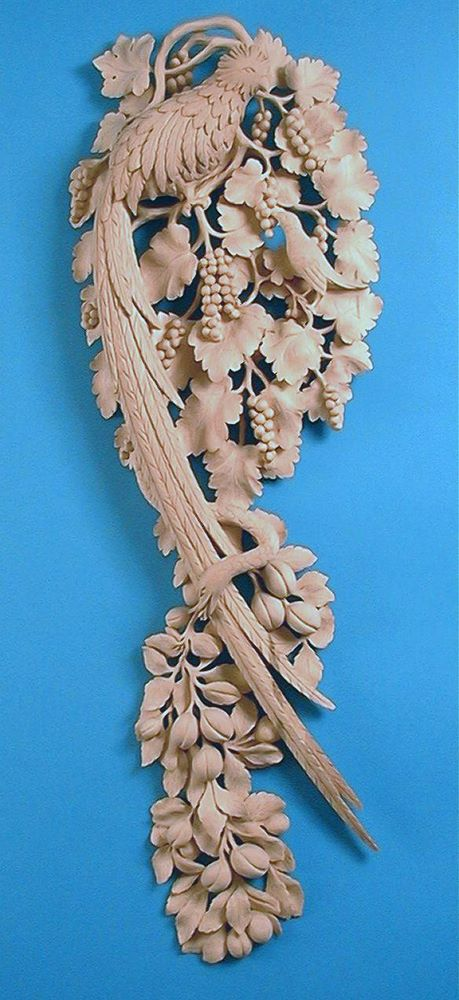
Petworth House

The V&A

bracket for Christ Church, Spitalfields being carved

== Death ==
Harms died on 18 December 2021 after a short illness.

== See also ==
- Wood carving
