= Listed buildings in Petworth =

Historic structures in West Sussex, England

Petworth is a town and civil parish in the Chichester district, West Sussex, England. It contains two grade I, 14 grade II* and 230 grade II listed buildings that are recorded in the National Heritage List for England.

This list is based on the information retrieved online from Historic England.

== Key ==
Grade	Criteria
I	Buildings that are of exceptional interest
II*	Particularly important buildings of more than special interest
II	Buildings that are of special interest

== Listing ==
Name	Grade	Location	Type	Completed (Note: The date given is the date used by Historic England as significant for the initial building or that of an important part in the structure's description.)	Date designated	Grid ref. (Note: The grid reference is based on the British national grid reference system, sometimes known as OSGB36, used by the Ordnance Survey.) Geo-coordinates	Notes	Entry number (Note: The "List Entry Number" is a unique number assigned to each listed building and scheduled monument by Historic England.)	Image	Wikidata
Ryde House	II	Angel Street			22 February 1955	SU9779721679; 50°59′10″N 0°36′29″W		1267132	Upload Photo	Q26557555
Pam Antiques And Wilmcote	II	Angel Street			22 May 1985	SU9779921658; 50°59′10″N 0°36′29″W		1223599	Upload Photo	Q26517854
The Presbytery of the Roman Catholic Church	II	Angel Street			22 May 1985	SU9793321663; 50°59′10″N 0°36′22″W		1223771	Upload Photo	Q26518021
Angel House	II	Angel Street			22 February 1955	SU9785721673; 50°59′10″N 0°36′26″W		1223768	Angel House More images	Q26518018
Holly Tree Cottage	II	Angel Street			22 May 1985	SU9796921624; 50°59′08″N 0°36′20″W		1223772	Upload Photo	Q26518022
The Red House	II	Angel Street			22 February 1955	SU9778421663; 50°59′10″N 0°36′30″W		1223508	Upload Photo	Q26517771
Angel Corner (the Card Shop with the Hairdresser's Above)	II	Angel Street			22 February 1955	SU9777421663; 50°59′10″N 0°36′30″W		1223596	Upload Photo	Q26517851
Fawley Cottage	II	Angel Street			22 May 1985	SU9802521548; 50°59′06″N 0°36′18″W		1223510	Upload Photo	Q26517773
Orchard House	II	Angel Street			22 May 1985	SU9815521549; 50°59′06″N 0°36′11″W		1223511	Upload Photo	Q26517774
The Angel Hotel	II	Angel Street			22 February 1955	SU9784021674; 50°59′10″N 0°36′27″W		1223767	Upload Photo	Q26518017
The Angel Shades	II	Angel Street			22 May 1985	SU9783621658; 50°59′10″N 0°36′27″W		1223509	Upload Photo	Q26517772
Grays	II	Angel Street			22 February 1955	SU9799221608; 50°59′08″N 0°36′19″W		1223928	Upload Photo	Q26518160
Leith Cottage	II	Angel Street			22 May 1985	SU9795121623; 50°59′08″N 0°36′21″W		1267072	Upload Photo	Q26557506
The Roman Catholic Church of the Sacred Heart	II	Angel Street			22 May 1985	SU9790821667; 50°59′10″N 0°36′23″W		1223770	The Roman Catholic Church of the Sacred Heart More images	Q23302331
Hill Cottage	II	Angel Street			22 February 1955	SU9797621619; 50°59′08″N 0°36′20″W		1223903	Upload Photo	Q26518138
Haltings Old Walls The Cottage	II	Angel Street			22 February 1955	SU9788121666; 50°59′10″N 0°36′25″W		1223769	Upload Photo	Q26518019
Egremont Row Nos 351-356 Leconfield Estate (Egremont Row)	II	351-356, Leconfield Estate, Angel Street			22 May 1985	SU9792821603; 50°59′08″N 0°36′22″W		1223740	Upload Photo	Q26517992
Retford Farmhouse	II	Balls Cross Road			22 May 1985	SU9788223997; 51°00′25″N 0°36′22″W		1223775	Upload Photo	Q26518025
Guntersbridge Farmhouse	II	Balls Cross Road			22 February 1955	SU9751023599; 51°00′13″N 0°36′42″W		1223947	Upload Photo	Q26518177
Keyfox Farmhouse	II	Balls Cross Road			22 May 1985	SU9775824044; 51°00′27″N 0°36′29″W		1223972	Upload Photo	Q26518199
Barn at Guntersbridge Farm to the North West of the Farmhouse	II	Balls Cross Road			22 May 1985	SU9747523613; 51°00′13″N 0°36′44″W		1223774	Upload Photo	Q26518024
Highgate Cottage	II	Balls Cross Road			22 May 1985	SU9804025365; 51°01′10″N 0°36′13″W		1223976	Upload Photo	Q26518203
The Coach House	II	Barton Lane			22 May 1985	SU9773821838; 50°59′16″N 0°36′32″W		1267030	Upload Photo	Q26557472
Medhone Farmhouse	II	Blackhouse Lane			22 May 1985	TQ0006825182; 51°01′02″N 0°34′29″W		1267008	Upload Photo	Q26557452
Blackbrook	II	Blackhouse Lane			22 May 1985	SU9929324388; 51°00′37″N 0°35′10″W		1224011	Upload Photo	Q26518232
Oldhams	II	Blackhouse Lane			22 May 1985	SU9961022865; 50°59′48″N 0°34′55″W		1223997	Upload Photo	Q26518219
Two Barns Adjoining Blackbrook on the South East	II	Blackhouse Lane			22 May 1985	SU9929324347; 51°00′36″N 0°35′10″W		1223979	Upload Photo	Q26518206
Westlands	II	Blackhouse Lane			22 February 1955	SU9994423270; 51°00′01″N 0°34′37″W		1223978	Upload Photo	Q26518205
Number 378A Leconfield Estate, Byworth	II	Byworth			22 May 1985	SU9882420679; 50°58′37″N 0°35′37″W		1266953	Upload Photo	Q26557401
The Old Post Office	II	Byworth			22 May 1985	SU9873821043; 50°58′49″N 0°35′41″W		1266967	Upload Photo	Q26557414
The Black Horse Public House	II	Byworth			22 May 1985	SU9869521103; 50°58′51″N 0°35′44″W		1267015	Upload Photo	Q26557458
K6 Telephone Kiosk Opposite the Old Post Office	II	Byworth			25 October 1989	SU9872321035; 50°58′49″N 0°35′42″W		1265143	Upload Photo	Q26555762
Causeway Cottage	II	Byworth			22 May 1985	SU9875221037; 50°58′49″N 0°35′41″W		1224092	Upload Photo	Q26518303
Trofts	II	Byworth			22 May 1985	SU9876020589; 50°58′35″N 0°35′41″W		1224095	Upload Photo	Q26518306
Hunger Corner's Farmhouse	II	Byworth			22 May 1985	SU9887220271; 50°58′24″N 0°35′35″W		1224096	Upload Photo	Q26518307
Byworth Edge Cottages	II	Byworth			22 May 1985	SU9887820075; 50°58′18″N 0°35′35″W		1224097	Upload Photo	Q26518308
Oades Cottage	II	Byworth			22 May 1985	SU9886420860; 50°58′43″N 0°35′35″W		1224093	Upload Photo	Q26518304
The Old School	II	Byworth			22 May 1985	SU9885220708; 50°58′38″N 0°35′36″W		1224094	Upload Photo	Q26518305
Goft's House	II	Byworth			22 May 1985	SU9877120394; 50°58′28″N 0°35′40″W		1224171	Upload Photo	Q26518374
Stone Cottage	II	Byworth			22 May 1985	SU9870221160; 50°58′53″N 0°35′43″W		1223980	Upload Photo	Q26518207
Badgers Cottage Bakers Keepers Cottage	II	Byworth			22 May 1985	SU9870521092; 50°58′51″N 0°35′43″W		1223982	Upload Photo	Q26518209
April Cottage Bay Tree Cottage Cobblers Lantern Cottage	II	Byworth			22 February 1955	SU9871521049; 50°58′49″N 0°35′43″W		1266991	Upload Photo	Q26557436
Nos 374 and 375 Leconfield Estate	II	374 and 375, Byworth			22 February 1955	SU9872421027; 50°58′49″N 0°35′42″W		1267034	Upload Photo	Q26557476
Canada Cottages	II	381 and 382, Canada Cottages, Haslingbourne Lane, Egdean			22 May 1985	SU9911419863; 50°58′11″N 0°35′23″W		1225278	Upload Photo	Q26519387
The South Entrance to the Churchyard	II	Church Street			22 May 1985	SU9767721842; 50°59′16″N 0°36′35″W		1224098	Upload Photo	Q26518309
The Parish Church of St Mary	I	Church Street			22 February 1955	SU9768221867; 50°59′17″N 0°36′35″W		1224199	The Parish Church of St Mary More images	Q17528912
Squire's Holt	II	Church Street			22 February 1955	SU9769021824; 50°59′15″N 0°36′34″W		1224215	Upload Photo	Q26518414
St Mary's Cottage	II	Church Street			5 November 1973	SU9769621822; 50°59′15″N 0°36′34″W		1224255	Upload Photo	Q26518452
Corall, Coal Merchants The Merlin Gallery Westbury	II	Coal Merchants, High Street			5 November 1973	SU9773521624; 50°59′09″N 0°36′32″W		1225437	Upload Photo	Q26519534
No 3 and 317 Leconfield Estate	II	3 and 317, Damer's Bridge			22 February 1955	SU9763921631; 50°59′09″N 0°36′37″W		1224272	Upload Photo	Q26518466
The Garden Wall Of The Leads, Denne Court, Stringer's Hall And Stringer's Cottage To The North Of The Building	II	East Street			22 May 1985	SU9775521743; 50°59′12″N 0°36′31″W		1224284	Upload Photo	Q26518478
Mystique Masala	II	East Street			22 February 1955	SU9770821816; 50°59′15″N 0°36′34″W		1266815	Upload Photo	Q26557275
K6 Telephone Kiosk, East Street	II	East Street			7 June 1989	SU9774621747; 50°59′13″N 0°36′32″W		1235166	Upload Photo	Q26528519
Myrtle Cottage	II	East Street			5 November 1973	SU9773321782; 50°59′14″N 0°36′32″W		1266812	Upload Photo	Q26557272
Tudor Rose	II	East Street			22 February 1955	SU9773621765; 50°59′13″N 0°36′32″W		1224388	Upload Photo	Q26518576
Daintrey House	II*	East Street, GU28 0AB			22 February 1955	SU9777621691; 50°59′11″N 0°36′30″W		1266902	Daintrey House More images	Q17531660
The Leads, Denne Court , Stringer's Hall And Stringer's Cottage	II*	East Street			22 February 1955	SU9776321723; 50°59′12″N 0°36′31″W		1224229	The Leads, Denne Court , Stringer's Hall And Stringer's Cottage More images	Q17531327
Boxall House	II	East Street, GU28 0AB			5 November 1973	SU9775321769; 50°59′13″N 0°36′31″W		1224275	Upload Photo	Q26518469
The Institute	II	East Street			22 February 1955	SU9773121811; 50°59′15″N 0°36′32″W		1224274	Upload Photo	Q26518468
The Former Lamp Standard at the Junction of East Street and Church Street	II	East Street			5 November 1973	SU9771621829; 50°59′15″N 0°36′33″W		1224226	Upload Photo	Q26518425
The Garden Wall of Daintrey Court to the North of the House	II	East Street			22 May 1985	SU9775821711; 50°59′11″N 0°36′31″W		1266903	Upload Photo	Q26557355
The Hermitage	II	East Street			22 February 1955	SU9788421706; 50°59′11″N 0°36′25″W		1224286	Upload Photo	Q26518480
The Old Girls School	II	East Street			22 February 1955	SU9775421797; 50°59′14″N 0°36′31″W		1224228	The Old Girls School More images	Q26518427
The Forecourt Railings of Daintrey House	II	East Street			22 February 1955	SU9776221692; 50°59′11″N 0°36′31″W		1224285	Upload Photo	Q26518479
Trumper's Cottage	II	East Street			5 November 1973	SU9775421684; 50°59′11″N 0°36′31″W		1224287	Upload Photo	Q26518481
George House	II	East Street			22 February 1955	SU9772521824; 50°59′15″N 0°36′33″W		1224227	Upload Photo	Q26518426
The Covert	II	East Street			5 November 1973	SU9773721775; 50°59′14″N 0°36′32″W		1224290	Upload Photo	Q26518485
Rowans	II	East Street			5 November 1973	SU9772521790; 50°59′14″N 0°36′33″W		1224291	Upload Photo	Q26518486
Octavia, Women's Clothing Paddington's Table, Wine Shop Premises Occupied By Octavia, Women's Clothing And Paddington's Table, Wine Shop	II	Women's Clothing			22 May 1985	SU9774821695; 50°59′11″N 0°36′32″W		1224288	Upload Photo	Q26518482
The Curriers And Haven Cottage	II	3, East Street			22 May 1985	SU9774821706; 50°59′11″N 0°36′32″W		1224289	Upload Photo	Q26518483
Buckfold Farmhouse	II	Fox Hill			22 February 1955	TQ0034723364; 51°00′03″N 0°34′17″W		1224443	Upload Photo	Q26518624
Fox Hill Cottage	II	Fox Hill			22 February 1955	TQ0015222697; 50°59′42″N 0°34′27″W		1266819	Upload Photo	Q26557278
Frank Muggeridge, Fruiterer Keith Follett, Crimpers The Connoisseurs Music Shop	II	Fruiterer, High Street			22 May 1985	SU9772121604; 50°59′08″N 0°36′33″W		1266423	Upload Photo	Q26556914
Norman Mitchell, Furniture Shop Plain N Fancy, Furniture Shop The Premises Occupied By Plain N Fancy, Furniture Shop And Norman Mitchell, Also A Furniture Shop	II	Furniture Shop, East Street			5 November 1973	SU9774221754; 50°59′13″N 0°36′32″W		1224377	Upload Photo	Q26518565
H Richardson, Butcher Om And S Shepherd, Greengrocer Premises Occupied By Om And S Shepherd, Greengrocer; The Golden Waggon Restautant; And H Richardson, Butcher The Golden Waggon Restautant	II	Golden Square			22 February 1955	SU9766221621; 50°59′09″N 0°36′36″W		1224445	Upload Photo	Q26518625
Charles Hennings, Caterers And Wine Merchants Lancaster House Lancaster House (Including, Charles Hennings, Caterers And Wine Merchants)	II	Golden Square			22 February 1955	SU9767621606; 50°59′08″N 0°36′35″W		1224475	Upload Photo	Q26518655
The Premises Of The Boys Brigade, First Petworth Company	II	Golden Square			22 May 1985	SU9765821643; 50°59′09″N 0°36′36″W		1224524	The Premises Of The Boys Brigade, First Petworth Company More images	Q26518699
Whitehall	II	Golden Square, GU28 0AP			22 February 1955	SU9769021626; 50°59′09″N 0°36′35″W		1266820	Upload Photo	Q26557279
Avenings	II*	Golden Square			22 February 1955	SU9768221652; 50°59′10″N 0°36′35″W		1224444	Avenings More images	Q17531347
Forecourt Railing of Avenings to the West of the House	II	Golden Square			22 February 1955	SU9767521653; 50°59′10″N 0°36′35″W		1224464	Upload Photo	Q26518644
Soanes Farmhouse	II	Grove Lane, GU28 0HY			22 February 1955	SU9801420714; 50°58′39″N 0°36′19″W		1266821	Upload Photo	Q26557280
Nos 328 A, B, C, D, E, F, G, H, I, K, L And M Leconfield Estate (Percy Row)	II	B, C, D, E, F, G, H, I, K, L And M Leconfield Estate (percy Row), 328a-i,			22 May 1985	SU9789021524; 50°59′05″N 0°36′24″W		1224548	Upload Photo	Q26518722
Nos 336 A, B, C, D, E, F, G And H Leconfield Estate	II	B, C, D, E, F, G And H Leconfield Estate, 336a-h, Grove Street			22 February 1955	SU9784821545; 50°59′06″N 0°36′27″W		1224785	Upload Photo	Q26518937
New Grove	II*	Grove Street			22 February 1955	SU9800221230; 50°58′56″N 0°36′19″W		1266633	New Grove More images	Q17531650
Regent House	II	Grove Street			22 May 1985	SU9792021446; 50°59′03″N 0°36′23″W		1224784	Upload Photo	Q26518936
Grove Cottage Grove House	II	Grove Street			22 February 1955	SU9791221473; 50°59′04″N 0°36′23″W		1224551	Upload Photo	Q26518725
Nos 329 and 329a Leconfield Estate	II	329 and 329a, Grove Street			22 May 1985	SU9788621480; 50°59′04″N 0°36′25″W		1224786	Upload Photo	Q26518938
330 The Cottage, 331 Mullins Cottage, And 332 Grove Street	II	332, Grove Street, GU28 0BD			22 May 1985	SU9791721393; 50°59′01″N 0°36′23″W		1266452	Upload Photo	Q26556942
334 and 335, Grove Street	II	334 and 335, Grove Street			22 May 1985	SU9793121418; 50°59′02″N 0°36′22″W		1266632	Upload Photo	Q26557108
Harpers, Hairdressers Premises Occupied By Harpers, Hairdressers And By Suzanne Suzanne	II	Hairdressers, Saddler's Row			22 February 1955	SU9761421647; 50°59′09″N 0°36′38″W		1226364	Upload Photo	Q26520374
Strood Farmhouse	II	Haslingbourne Lane			22 May 1985	SU9875419741; 50°58′07″N 0°35′42″W		1266634	Upload Photo	Q26557109
Barn at Strood Farm to the North West of the Farmhouse	II	Haslingbourne Lane			22 May 1985	SU9874319801; 50°58′09″N 0°35′42″W		1225273	Upload Photo	Q26519383
Haslingbourne	II	Haslingbourne Lane			22 May 1985	SU9819420395; 50°58′29″N 0°36′10″W		1224787	Upload Photo	Q26518939
Froghole Farmhouse	II	Haslingbourne Lane, Egdean			22 May 1985	SU9935219892; 50°58′12″N 0°35′11″W		1225279	Upload Photo	Q26519388
Woodruff's Farmhouse	II	Haslingbourne Lane, Egdean			22 May 1985	SU9959119206; 50°57′49″N 0°35′00″W		1225280	Upload Photo	Q26519389
Gorehill House	II	Haslingbourne Lane			22 May 1985	SU9850420131; 50°58′20″N 0°35′54″W		1225263	Upload Photo	Q26519375
No 383 Leconfield Estate	II	383, Haslingbourne Lane			22 May 1985	SU9869919694; 50°58′06″N 0°35′45″W		1224788	Upload Photo	Q26518940
Barn Adjoining No 414	II	Heath End			10 October 1985	SU9671618960; 50°57′43″N 0°37′27″W		1235156	Upload Photo	Q26528509
The Premises Occupied By Derek Hand, Antiques	II	High Street			22 May 1985	SU9775321604; 50°59′08″N 0°36′31″W		1225283	Upload Photo	Q26519392
Premises Occupied By Hw Speed, Butcher Southern Electricity	II	High Street			22 May 1985	SU9772321620; 50°59′09″N 0°36′33″W		1266397	Upload Photo	Q26556889
Stone House	II	High Street			22 February 1955	SU9784021569; 50°59′07″N 0°36′27″W		1266426	Upload Photo	Q26556917
Quoinstones	II	High Street			22 February 1955	SU9783121605; 50°59′08″N 0°36′27″W		1225387	Upload Photo	Q26519488
Stoney Croft	II	High Street			22 May 1985	SU9783721578; 50°59′07″N 0°36′27″W		1225286	Upload Photo	Q26519395
The Manse	II	High Street			22 May 1985	SU9784221541; 50°59′06″N 0°36′27″W		1225384	Upload Photo	Q26519485
Windmill House	II	High Street			5 November 1973	SU9779621594; 50°59′08″N 0°36′29″W		1225285	Upload Photo	Q26519394
Stone House Cottgae	II	High Street			22 May 1985	SU9783421556; 50°59′06″N 0°36′27″W		1225287	Upload Photo	Q26519396
Gateway to the Courtyard of Stone House Cottage and the Manse	II	High Street			22 May 1985	SU9784921569; 50°59′07″N 0°36′27″W		1225385	Upload Photo	Q26519486
Kitchen Court Lancaster Cottage The Nook	II	High Street			22 February 1955	SU9768121597; 50°59′08″N 0°36′35″W		1225281	Upload Photo	Q26519390
Fairfield Cottage and the Club Room	II	High Street, GU28 0AU			22 February 1955	SU9776521602; 50°59′08″N 0°36′31″W		1266409	Upload Photo	Q26556900
White Hart Place Cottage	II	High Street			5 November 1973	SU9779021594; 50°59′08″N 0°36′30″W		1225284	Upload Photo	Q26519393
Griggs Of Petworth Hazelman's Foodstore Leppards Upstairs	II	High Street			5 November 1973	SU9775421619; 50°59′08″N 0°36′31″W		1225389	Upload Photo	Q26519490
White Hart Cottage White Hart House	II	High Street			5 November 1973	SU9777821594; 50°59′08″N 0°36′30″W		1266424	Upload Photo	Q26556915
1, 2, 3 and 4, High Street	II	1, 2, 3 and 4, High Street			22 February 1955	SU9769921605; 50°59′08″N 0°36′34″W		1225282	Upload Photo	Q26519391
Nos 337-340 Leconfield Estate	II	337-340, High Street			22 May 1985	SU9784921592; 50°59′08″N 0°36′26″W		1225386	Upload Photo	Q26519487
Petworth Cottage Museum And Ricketts Cottage	II	346, High Street			5 November 1973	SU9781321606; 50°59′08″N 0°36′28″W		1225388	Upload Photo	Q26519489
Nos 347 Leconfield Estate	II	347, High Street			5 November 1973	SU9781321591; 50°59′08″N 0°36′28″W		1266425	Upload Photo	Q26556916
The Egremont Almshouses	II	Horsham Road			22 May 1985	SU9770622287; 50°59′30″N 0°36′33″W		1266347	Upload Photo	Q26556843
Bamborough	II	Lombard Street			22 May 1985	SU9767021784; 50°59′14″N 0°36′35″W		1266398	Bamborough More images	Q26556890
Bakehouse Cottage Court House Cottage	II	Lombard Street			5 November 1973	SU9768721763; 50°59′13″N 0°36′35″W		1266340	Upload Photo	Q26556837
Kevis House	II	Lombard Street			22 May 1985	SU9767121738; 50°59′12″N 0°36′35″W		1266399	Upload Photo	Q26556891
The Hungry Guest Cafe, Lombard Street	II	Lombard Street, GU28 0AG			22 May 1985	SU9768521726; 50°59′12″N 0°36′35″W		1075785	Upload Photo	Q26339604
Weavers' Shop	II	Lombard Street			5 November 1973	SU9767021728; 50°59′12″N 0°36′36″W		1075784	Upload Photo	Q26339601
Lombard House	II	Lombard Street			22 May 1985	SU9766021760; 50°59′13″N 0°36′36″W		1225392	Upload Photo	Q26519493
Little Lombard	II	Lombard Street			22 May 1985	SU9767121799; 50°59′14″N 0°36′35″W		1225462	Upload Photo	Q26519556
Forest Gallery, Lombard Street	II	Lombard Street, GU28 0AG			22 May 1985	SU9768621719; 50°59′12″N 0°36′35″W		1225393	Upload Photo	Q26519494
Tudor House	II	Lombard Street			22 February 1955	SU9768821812; 50°59′15″N 0°36′35″W		1225517	Upload Photo	Q26519606
Martlett House and Dales House	II	Lombard Street, GU28 0AG			5 November 1973	SU9768521738; 50°59′12″N 0°36′35″W		1225394	Upload Photo	Q26519495
Blackbirds Bookshop Plain N Fancy Women's Clothing Shop	II	Lombard Street			5 November 1973	SU9768521750; 50°59′13″N 0°36′35″W		1266328	Upload Photo	Q26556826
Lombard Cottage Petworth Club	II	Lombard Street			5 November 1973	SU9767221741; 50°59′12″N 0°36′35″W		1343325	Upload Photo	Q26627136
No 19 and the Premises of Wine Merchants	II	19, Lombard Street			5 November 1973	SU9768121799; 50°59′14″N 0°36′35″W		1266301	Upload Photo	Q26556803
Lloyds Pharmacy, Market Square	II	Market Square, GU28 0AH			5 November 1973	SU9768921671; 50°59′10″N 0°36′35″W		1225831	Upload Photo	Q26519894
The Star	II	Market Square, GU28 0AH			22 May 1985	SU9765321660; 50°59′10″N 0°36′36″W		1225521	Upload Photo	Q26519610
The National Westminster Bank	II	Market Square			22 May 1985	SU9764221707; 50°59′11″N 0°36′37″W		1225536	Upload Photo	Q26519623
Market Square House	II	Market Square			5 November 1973	SU9766621660; 50°59′10″N 0°36′36″W		1225520	Upload Photo	Q26519609
Austens Home Hardware, Market Square	II	Market Square, GU28 0AH			22 May 1985	SU9768321685; 50°59′11″N 0°36′35″W		1225550	Upload Photo	Q26519636
The Town Hall	II*	Market Square			22 February 1955	SU9765221679; 50°59′10″N 0°36′37″W		1225590	The Town Hall More images	Q17531359
K6 Telephone Kiosk, Market Square	II	Market Square			7 June 1989	SU9764421675; 50°59′10″N 0°36′37″W		1235167	Upload Photo	Q26528520
Wisteria House, Market Square	II	Market Square, GU28 0AJ			22 February 1955	SU9768221694; 50°59′11″N 0°36′35″W		1266303	Upload Photo	Q26556805
Old Tavern	II	Market Square, GU28 0AH			5 November 1973	SU9762721698; 50°59′11″N 0°36′38″W		1225518	Upload Photo	Q26519607
The Old Bank House	II	Market Square, GU28 0AH			22 February 1955	SU9763021687; 50°59′11″N 0°36′38″W		1266302	Upload Photo	Q26556804
Somerfield Stores, The Back Portion Only, Formerly The Manager's House With Store Adjoining	II	The Back Portion Only, Formerly The Manager's House With Store Adjoining			22 May 1985	SU9763721647; 50°59′09″N 0°36′37″W		1266297	Upload Photo	Q26556799
Coppards And Corner Cottage	II	Middle Street			22 February 1955	SU9777621624; 50°59′09″N 0°36′30″W		1266180	Upload Photo	Q26556694
Kitts Willow	II	Middle Street			5 November 1973	SU9777521649; 50°59′09″N 0°36′30″W		1266176	Upload Photo	Q26556690
Keytes	II	Middle Street			5 November 1973	SU9777621641; 50°59′09″N 0°36′30″W		1266300	Upload Photo	Q26556802
The Red Lion Inn	II	Middle Street			22 February 1955	SU9775821658; 50°59′10″N 0°36′31″W		1225821	Upload Photo	Q26519885
Alfreston House	II	Middle Street			5 November 1973	SU9778121637; 50°59′09″N 0°36′30″W		1225594	Upload Photo	Q26519677
Whistlers	II	Middle Street			5 November 1973	SU9777521657; 50°59′10″N 0°36′30″W		1225591	Upload Photo	Q26519674
Pound House	II	Midhurst Road			22 May 1985	SU9756321438; 50°59′03″N 0°36′41″W		1266263	Upload Photo	Q26556768
Milestone	II	New Street			22 May 1985	SU9773921684; 50°59′11″N 0°36′32″W		1225829	Upload Photo	Q26519892
New Street House	II	New Street			5 November 1973	SU9773221674; 50°59′10″N 0°36′32″W		1225830	Upload Photo	Q26519893
1 and 2, New Street	II	1 and 2, New Street			5 November 1973	SU9773521657; 50°59′10″N 0°36′32″W		1225596	Upload Photo	Q26519679
3-9, New Street	II	3-9, New Street			5 November 1973	SU9772221656; 50°59′10″N 0°36′33″W		1266146	Upload Photo	Q26556666
10, 10a and 10b, New Street	II	10, 10a and 10b, New Street, GU28 0AS			5 November 1973	SU9769821658; 50°59′10″N 0°36′34″W		1225827	Upload Photo	Q26519890
Raffling Farmhouse	II	North Chapel Road			5 November 1973	SU9677323743; 51°00′18″N 0°37′20″W		1225832	Upload Photo	Q26519895
Grinsteads	II	North Chapel Road			22 May 1985	SU9664324871; 51°00′54″N 0°37′25″W		1225834	Upload Photo	Q26519897
Osiers Farmhouse	II	North Chapel Road			22 February 1955	SU9684925217; 51°01′05″N 0°37′14″W		1225835	Upload Photo	Q26519898
Limbo Farmhouse	II	North Chapel Road			22 May 1985	SU9663424396; 51°00′39″N 0°37′26″W		1225833	Upload Photo	Q26519896
The East Entrance To The Churchyard The East Entrance To The Churchyard Of St Mary's Church With The Churchyard Wall To The North Of This	II	North Street			22 May 1985	SU9772121861; 50°59′16″N 0°36′33″W		1266069	Upload Photo	Q26556593
The Old Rectory	II	North Street			22 May 1985	SU9782321870; 50°59′17″N 0°36′28″W		1266147	Upload Photo	Q26556667
Somerset Lodge	II*	North Street			22 February 1955	SU9769221982; 50°59′20″N 0°36′34″W		1266109	Upload Photo	Q17531611
North House	II*	North Street			22 February 1955	SU9772221901; 50°59′18″N 0°36′33″W		1266148	North House More images	Q17531624
Somerset Hospital	II*	North Street			22 February 1955	SU9769821966; 50°59′20″N 0°36′34″W		1266149	Somerset Hospital More images	Q17531636
The Stonemasons Inn	II	North Street			22 May 1985	SU9770222381; 50°59′33″N 0°36′33″W		1225987	The Stonemasons Inn More images	Q26520038
Springfield House	II	North Street			22 May 1985	SU9767922133; 50°59′25″N 0°36′35″W		1225920	Upload Photo	Q26519977
Preyste House	II	North Street			5 November 1973	SU9770621932; 50°59′19″N 0°36′33″W		1225900	Upload Photo	Q26519956
Moonrakers Sheeling Cottage Wheatsheaf Cottage	II	North Street			5 November 1973	SU9768821999; 50°59′21″N 0°36′34″W		1225918	Upload Photo	Q26519975
Rectory Gate House	II	North Street			5 November 1973	SU9775421872; 50°59′17″N 0°36′31″W		1266133	Upload Photo	Q26556653
Rectory Gate Cottage	II	North Street			5 November 1973	SU9774421871; 50°59′17″N 0°36′32″W		1225837	Upload Photo	Q26519900
June Cottage Tudor Cottage Tyrells Cottage	II	North Street			22 February 1955	SU9769921946; 50°59′19″N 0°36′34″W		1225901	Upload Photo	Q26519957
The Nook (North West Wing), The Nook (North East Wing, Including Pandora's Box), Hell's Bells Corner And Christies	II	The Nook (north East Wing, Including Pandora's Box), Hell's Bells Corner And Christies			5 November 1973	SU9773221885; 50°59′17″N 0°36′32″W		1225897	Upload Photo	Q26519953
Preyste Cottages	II	1-3, North Street			5 November 1973	SU9771321919; 50°59′18″N 0°36′33″W		1225838	Upload Photo	Q26519901
Thompson's Hospital	II	1-7, Thompson's Hospital			22 February 1955	SU9767822178; 50°59′27″N 0°36′35″W		1225921	Upload Photo	Q26519978
Nos 293 and 294 Leconfield Estate	II	293 and 294, North Street			22 May 1985	SU9768022252; 50°59′29″N 0°36′35″W		1225923	Upload Photo	Q26519980
Nos 296, 297, 298 And 299 Leconfield Estate	II	297, 298 and 299 Leconfield Estate, 296, 298 and 299, North Street			22 May 1985	SU9768422242; 50°59′29″N 0°36′34″W		1266112	Upload Photo	Q26556633
Nos 301 and 302 Leconfield Estate	II	301 and 302, North Street			22 February 1955	SU9768722215; 50°59′28″N 0°36′34″W		1225922	Upload Photo	Q26519979
Nos 306 and 307 Leconfield Estate	II	306 and 307, North Street			22 May 1985	SU9767922145; 50°59′26″N 0°36′35″W		1266111	Upload Photo	Q26556632
Nos 309 and 309a Leconfield Estate	II	309 and 309a, North Street			22 May 1985	SU9768122115; 50°59′25″N 0°36′35″W		1225919	Upload Photo	Q26519976
Chantry Cottage	II	Park Road			22 May 1985	SU9759021719; 50°59′12″N 0°36′40″W		1266113	Upload Photo	Q26556634
The Pedestrian Entrance To Petworth House The Visitors' Entrance To Petworth House, Church Street, And The Ledge Adjoining	II	Church Street, Petworth House			22 May 1985	SU9764421837; 50°59′16″N 0°36′37″W		1226048	Upload Photo	Q26520090
Wall Of Petworth Park Along North Street As Far As Hampers Common Lodges	II	North Street, Petworth Park, Petworth House			22 May 1985	SU9767722304; 50°59′31″N 0°36′35″W		1226201	Upload Photo	Q26520228
The Garden Temple in the Grounds of Petworth House to North West of the Butler's House	II	Petworth House			5 November 1973	SU9757222165; 50°59′26″N 0°36′40″W		1265979	The Garden Temple in the Grounds of Petworth House to North West of the Butler's House More images	Q26556512
Cricket Lodge, Petworth House, And The South Wall Of Petworth Park To The East And West Of The Lodge In Midhurst Road	II	Petworth House, And The South Wall Of Petworth Park To The East And West Of The Lodge In Midhurst Road, Petworth Park			22 May 1985	SU9726821467; 50°59′04″N 0°36′56″W		1266062	Upload Photo	Q26556587
The Butler's House, Petworth House	II	Petworth House			22 May 1985	SU9765822050; 50°59′22″N 0°36′36″W		1266064	Upload Photo	Q26556589
The Carpenter's Workshops, Petworth House	II	Petworth House			22 May 1985	SU9753221670; 50°59′10″N 0°36′43″W		1266061	Upload Photo	Q26556586
Urn Situated on Ridge to North West of Petworth House	II	Petworth House			22 May 1985	SU9750821988; 50°59′21″N 0°36′44″W		1266065	Urn Situated on Ridge to North West of Petworth House More images	Q26556590
The Gate to the South West of Petworth House Leading from the Garden into the Park	II	Petworth House			22 February 1955	SU9744621761; 50°59′13″N 0°36′47″W		1226051	Upload Photo	Q26520091
The Servant's Wing	II*	Petworth House			22 February 1955	SU9764221905; 50°59′18″N 0°36′37″W		1226045	The Servant's Wing More images	Q17531370
Garden Temple in the Grounds of Petworth House to the North of the Preceding Temple	II	Petworth House			5 November 1973	SU9756722383; 50°59′33″N 0°36′40″W		1226200	Garden Temple in the Grounds of Petworth House to the North of the Preceding Temple More images	Q26520227
Petworth House	I	Petworth House			22 February 1955	SU9758621891; 50°59′17″N 0°36′40″W		1225989	Petworth House More images	Q2081335
The Fire Engine House with the Garden Temple Adjoining	II	Petworth House			22 May 1985	SU9765821952; 50°59′19″N 0°36′36″W		1226056	The Fire Engine House with the Garden Temple Adjoining More images	Q26520095
The Stables Of Petworth House The Stables Of Petworth House, East Wing	II*	Petworth House			22 February 1955	SU9762321799; 50°59′14″N 0°36′38″W		1226050	Upload Photo	Q17531381
The Estate Office, Petworth House	II	Petworth House			22 February 1955	SU9756021675; 50°59′10″N 0°36′41″W		1226052	Upload Photo	Q26520092
The Gate Posts Of The Wood Yard Gate, Petworth House The Gate Posts Of The Wood Yard Gates To Petworth House, North Street	II	Petworth House, North Street			5 November 1973	SU9769821916; 50°59′18″N 0°36′34″W		1266063	Upload Photo	Q26556588
The Old Estate Office	II	Petworth House			22 February 1955	SU9763321862; 50°59′16″N 0°36′37″W		1225924	The Old Estate Office More images	Q26519981
Statue Of Hound, Upper Pond	II	Upper Pond, Petworth House			22 May 1985	SU9717821934; 50°59′19″N 0°37′01″W		1266007	Statue Of Hound, Upper Pond More images	Q26556537
Boathouse, Upper Pond	II	Upper Pond, Petworth House			22 May 1985	SU9708422201; 50°59′28″N 0°37′05″W		1226057	Boathouse, Upper Pond More images	Q26520096
The Main Gate And Lodge Of Petworth House, With The Wall To The East And South Of These In Park Road The Main Gate And Lodge Of Petworth House, With The Wall To The East And South Of This	II*	Petworth House			22 February 1955	SU9757121742; 50°59′13″N 0°36′41″W		1266060	Upload Photo	Q17531600
New Lodges, Petworth Park New Lodges	II	Petworth Park, Midhurst Road			22 May 1985	SU9673121623; 50°59′09″N 0°37′24″W		1226054	Upload Photo	Q26520094
Hampers Common Lodges, Petworth Park Hampers Common Lodges, Petworth Park Including Gate Piers	II	Petworth Park			22 May 1985	SU9745522698; 50°59′44″N 0°36′46″W		1265980	Upload Photo	Q26556513
No1 Pound Place	II	1, Pound Place			22 February 1955	SU9760321610; 50°59′08″N 0°36′39″W		1226203	Upload Photo	Q26520230
No2 Pound Place	II	2, Pound Place			22 February 1955	SU9760921610; 50°59′08″N 0°36′39″W		1265982	Upload Photo	Q26556515
Premises Occupied By Wp Morland, Fishmonger, With The House Attached On The North	II	Pound Street			22 February 1955	SU9759521612; 50°59′08″N 0°36′39″W		1265981	Upload Photo	Q26556514
York Cottage	II*	Pound Street			22 February 1955	SU9758821488; 50°59′04″N 0°36′40″W		1265924	Upload Photo	Q17531570
Nos 398a and 398b Leconfield Estate	II	Pound Street			22 May 1985	SU9757021569; 50°59′07″N 0°36′41″W		1265930	Upload Photo	Q26556469
Newlands (one of the Offices of Chichester District Council)	II*	Pound Street			22 February 1955	SU9759221476; 50°59′04″N 0°36′40″W		1265984	Newlands (one of the Offices of Chichester District Council) More images	Q17531586
South East Corner Of The Garden Wall Of Petworth House South East Corner Of The Wall Of Petworth Park And The Armoury South East Corner Of The Wall Of Petworth Park In Pound Street And Midhurst Road, Enclosing The Kitchen Garden And The Park To The West Of This, Together With The Armoury	II	Pound Street, Petworth House			22 May 1985	SU9753321461; 50°59′03″N 0°36′43″W		1226053	Upload Photo	Q66477462
Gate Piers at the Entrance to Culvercroft to the North of the House	II	Pound Street			22 May 1985	SU9756621636; 50°59′09″N 0°36′41″W		1265929	Upload Photo	Q26556468
Maid Marion Food Store Trowell	II	Pound Street			22 May 1985	SU9759321602; 50°59′08″N 0°36′40″W		1226204	Upload Photo	Q26520231
Boxgrove Little Boxgrove	II	Pound Street			22 May 1985	SU9759821536; 50°59′06″N 0°36′39″W		1226205	Upload Photo	Q26520232
Trowell Cottage	II	Pound Street			22 May 1985	SU9759321592; 50°59′08″N 0°36′40″W		1226298	Upload Photo	Q26520315
The Garden Wall of Boxgrove to the North of the House	II	Pound Street			22 May 1985	SU9758821570; 50°59′07″N 0°36′40″W		1226305	Upload Photo	Q26520319
The Former Stables of Newlands to the South East of the House Now Also Part of the Council Offices	II	Pound Street			22 February 1955	SU9759221447; 50°59′03″N 0°36′40″W		1226207	Upload Photo	Q26520234
Culvercroft	II	Pound Street			22 May 1985	SU9755621606; 50°59′08″N 0°36′41″W		1226208	Upload Photo	Q26520235
Gate Piers at the Entrance to the Coach House and to the North West of the Last Item	II	Pound Street			22 May 1985	SU9756321650; 50°59′10″N 0°36′41″W		1226328	Upload Photo	Q26520341
Magnolia House	II	Pound Street			22 May 1985	SU9756821557; 50°59′07″N 0°36′41″W		1226329	Upload Photo	Q26520342
John's Stores	II	Pound Street			5 November 1973	SU9759921625; 50°59′09″N 0°36′39″W		1226247	Upload Photo	Q26520268
1, 3, 5 and 7, Pound Street	II	1, 3, 5 and 7, Pound Street			22 February 1955	SU9759321635; 50°59′09″N 0°36′40″W		1226202	Upload Photo	Q26520229
19, Pound Street	II	19, Pound Street			22 February 1955	SU9759021514; 50°59′05″N 0°36′40″W		1265983	Upload Photo	Q26556516
20 and 21, Pound Street	II	20 and 21, Pound Street			5 November 1973	SU9759021504; 50°59′05″N 0°36′40″W		1226309	Upload Photo	Q26520323
22, Pound Street	II	22, Pound Street			22 February 1955	SU9759021495; 50°59′05″N 0°36′40″W		1226206	Upload Photo	Q26520233
Egdean Cottage	II	Pulborough Road			22 May 1985	SU9996819662; 50°58′04″N 0°34′40″W		1265892	Upload Photo	Q26556437
Church of St Bartholomew	II*	Pulborough Road, Egdean			22 February 1955	SU9965420098; 50°58′18″N 0°34′55″W		1226330	Church of St Bartholomew More images	Q17531407
Rectory Cottage And Wisteria Cottage	II	Rectory Lane			22 May 1985	SU9779321832; 50°59′15″N 0°36′29″W		1225836	Upload Photo	Q26519899
Brinksole Farmhouse	II	Riverhill Road			22 May 1985	SU9999122261; 50°59′28″N 0°34′36″W		1226332	Upload Photo	Q26520344
Riverhill House	II	Riverhill Road			22 February 1955	TQ0020921325; 50°58′57″N 0°34′26″W		1226331	Upload Photo	Q26520343
Nos 85 And 86 Leconfield Estate Riverhill Farmhouse	II	85 and 86, Riverhill Road			22 May 1985	TQ0026121417; 50°59′00″N 0°34′23″W		1265893	Upload Photo	Q26556438
The Flats (former Police Station)	II	Rosemary Lane			22 May 1985	SU9780621496; 50°59′04″N 0°36′29″W		1226333	Upload Photo	Q26520345
Fairview House And The Mill House	II	Rosemary Lane, GU28 0AY			22 May 1985	SU9778321557; 50°59′06″N 0°36′30″W		1265894	Upload Photo	Q26556439
Swan House	II	Saddlers Row			24 July 1989	SU9761021668; 50°59′10″N 0°36′39″W		1235168	Upload Photo	Q26528521
Tudor Cottage Restaurant	II	Saddler's Row			22 February 1955	SU9762421644; 50°59′09″N 0°36′38″W		1226334	Upload Photo	Q26520346
Saddler's Cottage	II	Saddler's Row			22 February 1955	SU9761321638; 50°59′09″N 0°36′39″W		1265895	Upload Photo	Q26556440
Garden House Antiques	II	Saddler's Row			5 November 1973	SU9759021660; 50°59′10″N 0°36′40″W		1226367	Upload Photo	Q26520377
The Manor House	II	Shimmings			22 February 1955	SU9846221760; 50°59′13″N 0°35′55″W		1226390	Upload Photo	Q26520391
Nos 358, 359 And 360 Leconfield Estate	II	359 and 360 Leconfield Estate, 358, 359 and 360, Shimmings			22 May 1985	SU9847721720; 50°59′11″N 0°35′54″W		1265885	Upload Photo	Q26556432
Nos 361, 362 And 363 Leconfield Estate	II	362 and 363 Leconfield Estate, 361, 362 and 363, Shimmings			22 February 1955	SU9848221635; 50°59′09″N 0°35′54″W		1226391	Upload Photo	Q26520392
Shopham Bridge	II	Shopham Bridge Road, Sutton			22 May 1985	SU9846518511; 50°57′27″N 0°35′58″W		1265533	Shopham Bridge More images	Q26556119
Barn at Bigenor Farm to the West of the Farmhouse	II	Shopham Bridge Road			22 February 1955	SU9902118424; 50°57′24″N 0°35′30″W		1226506	Upload Photo	Q26520497
Bigenor	II	Shopham Bridge Road, GU28 0JP			22 February 1955	SU9910118420; 50°57′24″N 0°35′25″W		1265886	Upload Photo	Q26556433
Nos 390 B and C Leconfield Estate	II	390b and 390c, Shopham Bridge Road			22 May 1985	SU9857518592; 50°57′30″N 0°35′52″W		1265816	Upload Photo	Q26556371
Petworth Railway Station (disused)	II	Station Road			12 May 1977	SU9698719162; 50°57′49″N 0°37′13″W		1226393	Upload Photo	Q26520395
Coultershaw Farmhouse	II	Station Road			22 May 1985	SU9722619454; 50°57′59″N 0°37′00″W		1226392	Upload Photo	Q26520394
Honeypot Cottage	II	414, Station Road			22 May 1985	SU9672418945; 50°57′43″N 0°37′27″W		1265833	Upload Photo	Q26556388
Premises Occupied By He Wakeford, Tailor	II	Tailor, Market Square			22 February 1955	SU9766521714; 50°59′12″N 0°36′36″W		1225519	Upload Photo	Q26519608
Syllbrick Cottage	II				22 May 1985	SU9872921067; 50°58′50″N 0°35′42″W		1223983	Upload Photo	Q26518210
Petworth War Memorial	II				23 November 2015	SU9769321839; 50°59′16″N 0°36′34″W		1430811	Petworth War Memorial More images	Q26677651
Damer's Bridge Cottage	II				22 February 1955	SU9765321628; 50°59′09″N 0°36′37″W		1224225	Upload Photo	Q26518424

== See also ==
- Grade I listed buildings in West Sussex
- Grade II* listed buildings in West Sussex
