= Petworth House =

Country house in Petworth, West Sussex

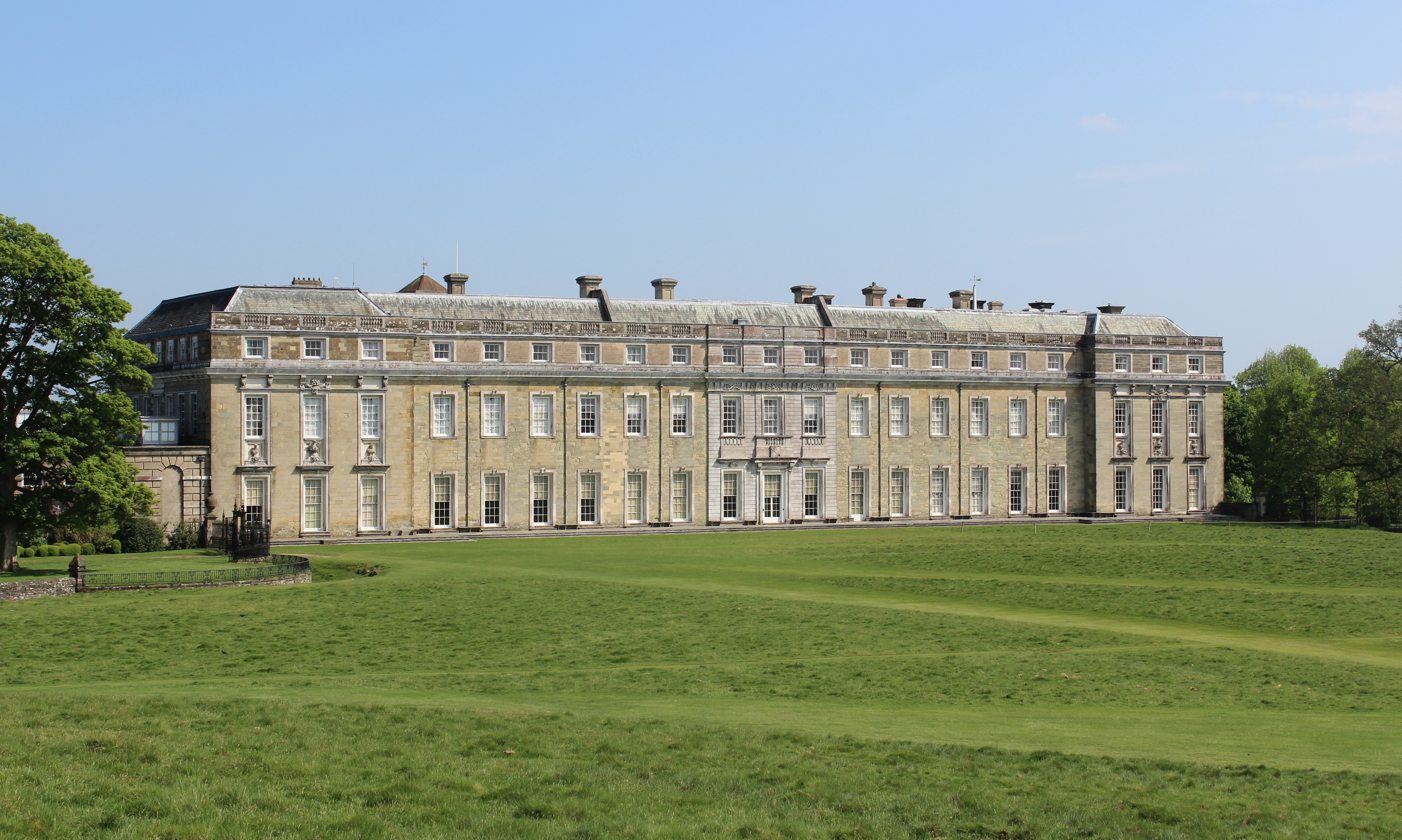
- Petworth House, west façade
- Interactive map of Petworth House
- 50.9881°N 0.6110°W
- Type: Country house, Baroque
- Location: Petworth, Chichester District, West Sussex
- OS grid reference: SU975218

History
- Built: 1688

Site notes
- Owner: National Trust

Listed Building – Grade I
- Designated: 1 June 1984
- Reference no.: 1000162

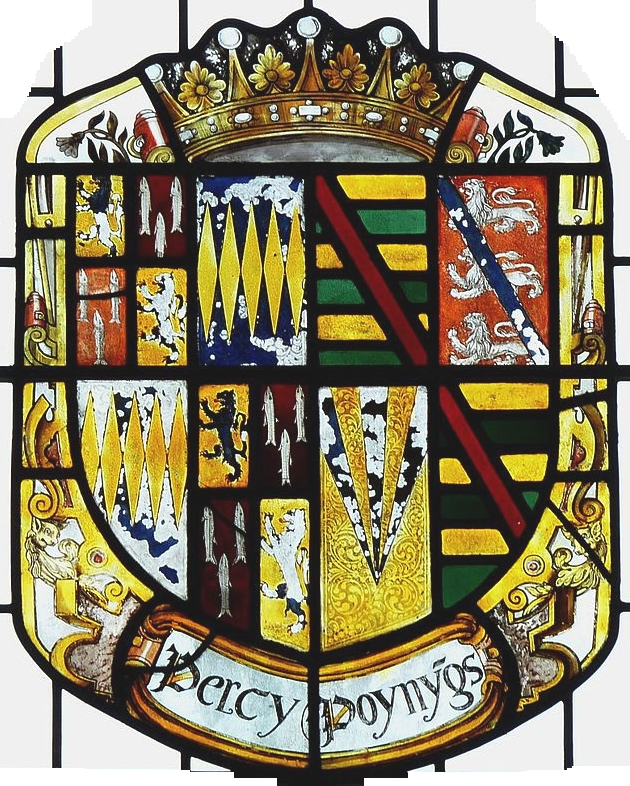
The 16th-century Percy Window in Petworth House Chapel, showing the arms of Henry Percy, 3rd Earl of Northumberland (1421–1461) impaled with the arms of Eleanor Poynings, his wife

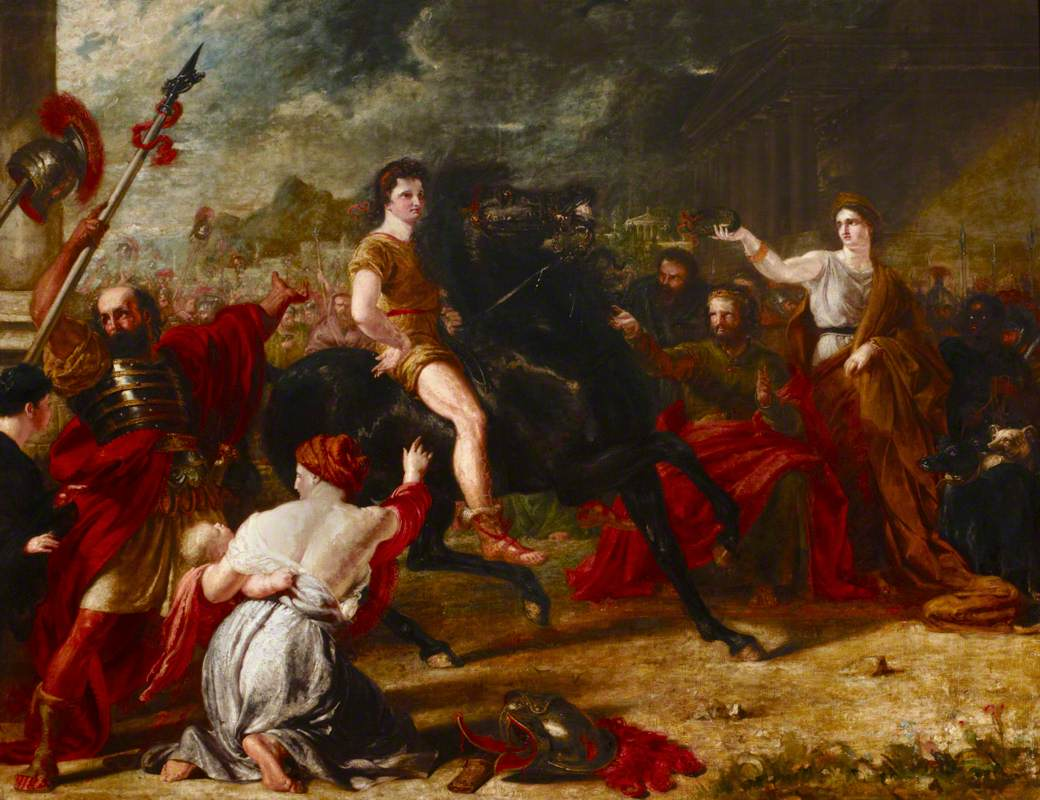
Benjamin Robert Haydon 1826 painting Alexander the Great Taming Bucephalus painted for Petworth House

Petworth House is a late 17th-century Grade I listed country house in the parish of Petworth, West Sussex, England. It was built in 1688 by Charles Seymour, 6th Duke of Somerset, and altered in the 1870s to the design of the architect Anthony Salvin. It contains intricate wood-carvings by Grinling Gibbons (d. 1721). It is the manor house of the manor of Petworth. For centuries it was the southern home for the Percy family, earls of Northumberland.

Petworth is famous for its extensive art collection made by the Northumberland and Seymour/Somerset families and George Wyndham, 3rd Earl of Egremont (1751–1837), containing many works by his friend J. M. W. Turner. It also has an expansive deer park, landscaped by Capability Brown, which contains a large herd of fallow deer.

== History ==
=== Medieval manor house ===
The manor of Petworth first came into the possession of the Percy family as a royal gift from Adeliza of Louvain, the widow of King Henry I (1100–1135), to her brother Joscelin of Louvain. He later married the Percy heiress and adopted the surname Percy. His descendants became the earls of Northumberland, the most powerful family in northern England. The Percy family, whose primary seat was at Alnwick Castle in Northumberland, bordering Scotland, intended Petworth to be for their occasional residence only.

The site was previously occupied by a fortified manor house built by Henry de Percy, 1st Baron Percy (1273–1314), in 1308–09, the chapel and undercroft of which still survive as part of the current house.

However, in the 16th century, the Percy family came into conflict with the crown as the staunchly Catholic family fell foul of the English Reformation which resulted in Petworth being briefly taken from them by King Henry VIII, restored to them by Queen Mary I before the wider family came under scrutiny during the reign of Queen Elizabeth I. Thomas Percy, 7th Earl of Northumberland, allied the family to Mary, Queen of Scots, and led the 1569 Rising of the North against Elizabeth with the aim of deposing her and placing Mary on the throne – this failed and led to his execution for treason in 1572. His younger brother, Henry Percy, 8th Earl of Northumberland, would regain his title from the Queen after begging her mercy and was granted his freedom on the condition that the family be confined to Petworth where they could be observed by the court. The house at Petworth was therefore transformed and expanded to become the permanent home of the family with grand stables erected and a pleasure garden laid out at this time. A part of this era manor house, a 'Lost' North wing, was discovered during archaeological excavations in 2012–15 under the lawn at the front of the house having been demolished in 1692.

=== Baroque house ===
In 1670 Josceline Percy, 11th Earl of Northumberland (1644–1670), died without a male heir, and thus his considerable fortune and estates of Petworth House, Alnwick Castle, Syon House and Northumberland House were inherited by his 2-year-old daughter and sole heiress, Lady Elizabeth Percy (1667–1722). In 1682, at the age of 16 and already twice widowed, she married the 20-year-old Charles Seymour, 6th Duke of Somerset (1662–1748), whose family seat was Marlborough Castle in Wiltshire. They became one of the wealthiest couples in England.

It was the 6th Duke, nicknamed 'the Proud Duke', and the Duchess who rebuilt the house between 1688 and 1702 in the Baroque style that favoured order and symmetry. It was very much inspired by the Palace of Versailles and aimed to establish Petworth as a rival to these European palaces. (Note: "In 1682 Petworth passed by marriage from the Percies to the 6th Duke of Somerset and it is to him the Proud Duke that we owe by far the larger part of the existing house.")

The grounds and wider parkland were also managed at this time with the parkland being home to quarries and proving an industrial and working landscape supporting the building works and the house. Around the house were planted more formal gardens including an avenue of lime trees approaching the house, a canal gardens and fishponds, parterre, great greenhouse and Orangery. Completing the formal gardens was a Quarter Piece Lawn and Rampart terraces comprising a series of walks carved into the hill and accompanied by carved seats, stairs and statues.

=== Split inheritance challenges and Capability Brown ===
Since 1750 the house and estate have been owned by the prominent Wyndham family, descended from Sir Charles Wyndham, 4th Baronet (1710–1763), of Orchard Wyndham in Somerset, a nephew and co-heir of Algernon Seymour, 7th Duke of Somerset (1684–1750). As part of the inheritance and splitting-up of the great Percy inheritance, which had been a source of contention between the 7th Duke and his father the 6th Duke, in 1749 after the death of the 6th Duke, King George II granted the 7th Duke four extra titles in the peerage, including Baron Cockermouth and Earl of Egremont, with the latter two created with special remainder to Sir Charles Wyndham, the intended and actual recipient of Petworth, Cockermouth Castle and Egremont Castle. Following the 7th Duke's death in 1750, his lands and titles were split between his daughter, Lady Elizabeth Seymour and her husband Sir Hugh Smithson, 4th Baronet (d.1786), and Charles Wyndham through the 7th Duke's deceased brother-in-law Sir William Wyndham. The former inherited the northern Percy estates, including Alnwick Castle and Syon House, together with the titles Baron Warkworth of Warkworth Castle and Earl of Northumberland and whose descendants are the current Dukes of Northumberland based at Alnwick Castle. The latter inherited Petworth and some estates in Sussex, Cumbria and Yorkshire as earls of Egremont.

The 2nd Earl was responsible for the collections of Rococo mirrors and antique statues that exist in the house today and was responsible for commissioning Lancelot 'Capability' Brown to landscape the parkland during the 1750s and 1760s. The works involved the demolition of the formal gardens that preceded it, the landscaping of the wider parkland to raise the profile of the lawn in front of the house, infill quarries, smooth over the terraced walks and digging out buildings in the parkland down to foundation level. Archaeological investigations seemed to suggest that the turf was removed prior to the levelling works so they could be replaced after the works were completed and aiding the current natural look to the landscape.

=== House of art ===
It was George Wyndham, 3rd Earl of Egremont (1751–1837), who solidified the house's reputation as one of fine art. He inherited the house in 1763 and began what has been termed a "golden age" of Petworth when he expanded his collection of contemporary art and expanded and changed the house in order to display it best, in particular through the addition of the North Gallery in 1824–5. He was patron to many contemporary artists including J. M. W. Turner and John Constable who were frequent guests to the house and painted the house and its parkland frequently - this has more recently helped inform restorations to the house and parkland.

The 3rd Earl bequeathed Petworth and Cockermouth Castle to his illegitimate son and adopted heir Col. George Wyndham (1787–1869), but who could not inherit the title of Earl of Egremont so was instead created Baron Leconfield by Queen Victoria in 1859.

The title of Earl of Egremont instead passed to his nephew George Wyndham, 4th Earl of Egremont (1786–1845), who, while not inheriting Petworth, instead received the (not inconsiderable) entailed Wyndham estates including Orchard Wyndham (still owned today by a Wyndham heir, William Wadham Wyndham, born 1940). The 4th Earl attempted to make up for the loss of Petworth by building his own stately home in Devon called Silverton Park, which was demolished in 1902.

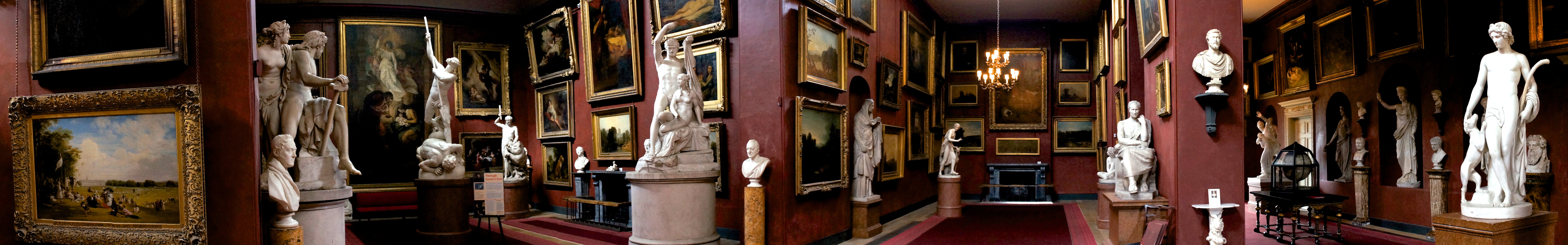
The North Gallery at Petworth House showing a significant section of the collection of paintings, sculpture and objects held in the house.

=== Open to public: National Trust ===
The house and deer park were handed over to the nation in 1947 by Charles Wyndham, 3rd Baron Leconfield (1872–1952), and are now managed by the National Trust under the name Petworth House & Park. The Leconfield Estates would continue to own much of Petworth and the surrounding area and the family would be able to continue living in part of Petworth House. It was John Wyndham, 6th Baron Leconfield and since 1963 also 1st Baron Egremont, who negotiated the gift of the contents of the house, in particular the paintings and sculptures, into the property of the National Trust in lieu of accumulated death duties. The current Lord and Lady Egremont continue a tradition of unbroken occupancy at Petworth House today with Max Egremont and his family living in the south wing, allowing much of the remainder of the House to be open to the public. Lady Egremont has restored the gardens. In its 2018/2019 Annual Report, the Trust reported that Petworth House received 178,760 visitors. In its 2022 Annual Report, the Trust reported that Petworth House received 147,079 visitors in 2021–22, having had a dip in numbers to 88,600 due to the COVID-19 pandemic in 2020–21.

Today's building houses an important collection of paintings and sculptures, including 20 oil paintings by J. M. W. Turner, who was a regular visitor to Petworth, paintings by Anthony van Dyck and Joshua Reynolds, carvings by Grinling Gibbons and Ben Harms, classical and neoclassical sculptures (including ones by John Flaxman and John Edward Carew), and wall and ceiling paintings by Louis Laguerre. There is also a terrestrial globe by Emery Molyneux, believed to be the only one in the world in its original 1592 state.

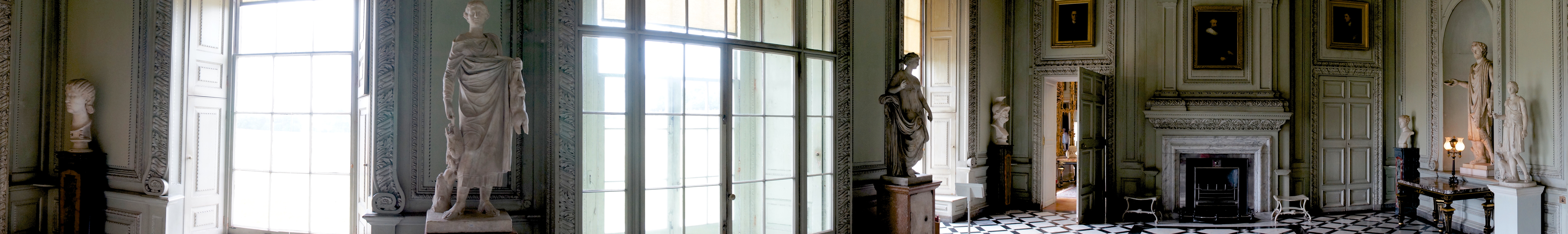
The Marble Hall at Petworth House, one of the state rooms open to visitors showing some of the classical sculpture on display.

== Petworth Park ==
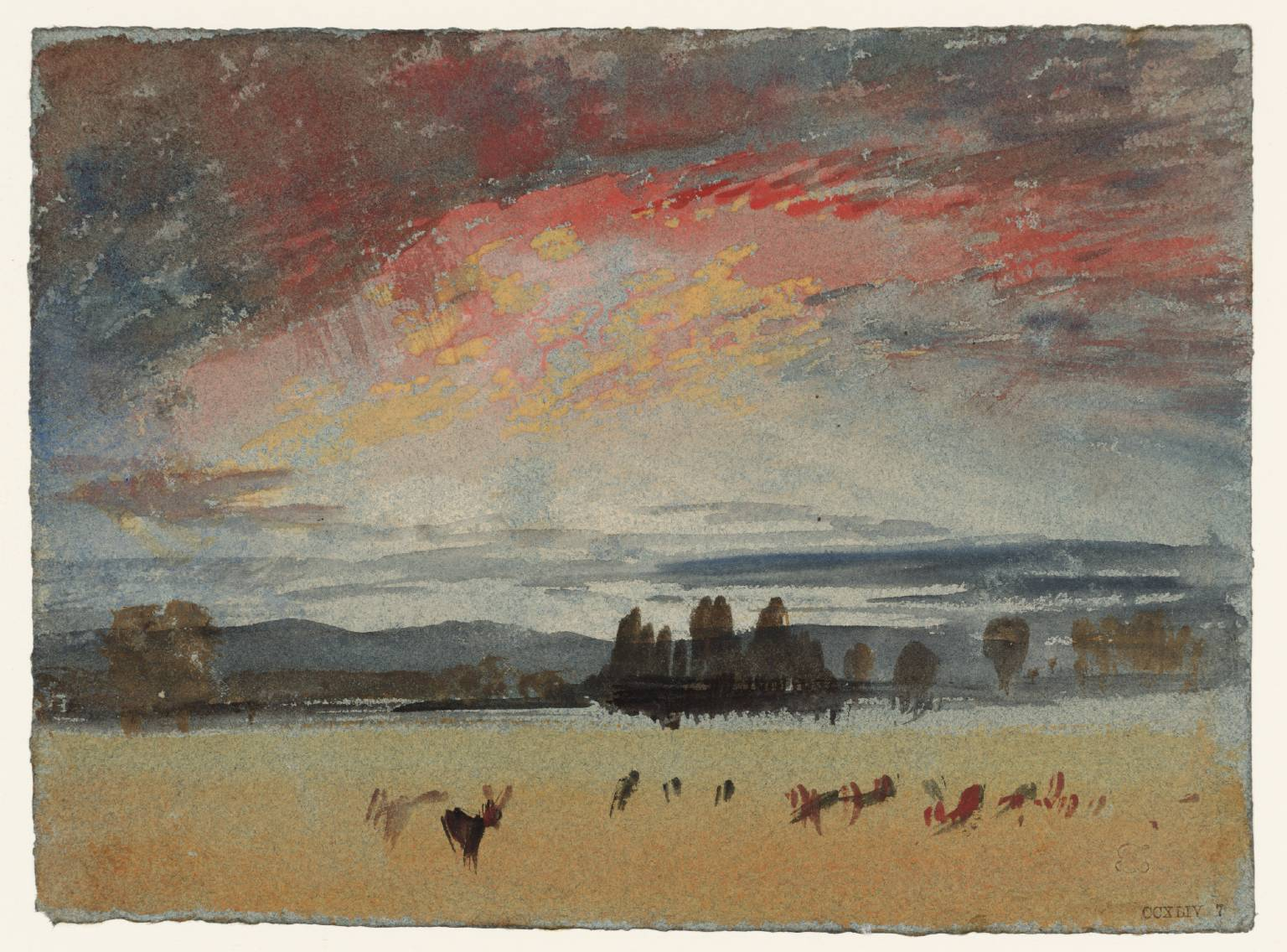
The Deer in Petworth Park, J. M. W. Turner, 1827.

The 283-hectare (700-acre) landscaped park, known as Petworth Park, contains a large herd of fallow deer. It is one of the more famous in England, largely on account of a number of pictures of it which were painted by Turner. There is also a 12-hectare (30-acre) woodland garden, known as the Pleasure Ground and some unusual ha-has. The landscaped park and pleasure grounds of Petworth are Grade I listed on the Register of Historic Parks and Gardens.

Petworth House is home to the Petworth House Real Tennis Club (many such private estates held real tennis courts). Petworth Park is also a cricket venue, for the refounded Petworth Park Cricket Club.

== Surrounding area ==
As was usual for a mediaeval manor house, it was built in its original form next to the parish church (to provide the lord of the manor with enhanced spiritual benefits), around which developed a village, now grown to a sizeable town. Such position is unusual for a country mansion of its size and date, which were frequently later re-built on new more private sites away from the original manor house, or the church (Note: As was the case for example at Castle Hill, Filleigh, in Devon.) and village were on occasion demolished to provide the desired privacy. Petworth House and Park are thus today situated immediately adjacent to the town of Petworth, with its shops and restaurants.

As an insight into the lives of past estate workers the Petworth Cottage Museum has been established in High Street, Petworth, furnished as it would have been in about 1910.

== Visitor facilities ==
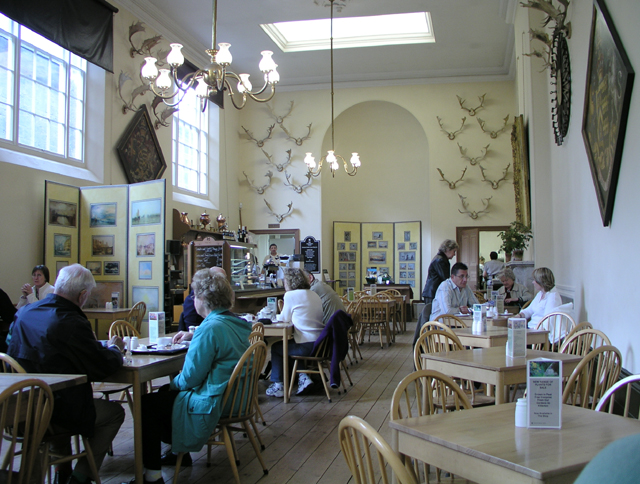
Audit House Cafe at Petworth House.

Since being opened to the public, the house has attracted a significant number of visitors each year to see the art collections, explore the parkland and pleasure grounds. As such, the National Trust opened and run a number of facilities for visitors at the site.

The trust run two car parks for visitors, a main car park ideally placed for the house and pleasure gardens and a more northern car park for the wider deer park. With the exception of a visitor reception near to the main car park and a food and beverage kiosk in the old fire station, the visitor amenities are all located within the old service block for the house. This service wing contains the site shop, a second-hand bookshop, a cafe in the old Audit Room (which opened originally as a sculpture gallery before being used as a hall for large gatherings of the estate staff and servants), toilets and a seasonal art gallery. The service wing also contains a few of the historic kitchen rooms preserved for the public to view.

In addition to publishing a general visitor guidebook, the trust also publishes an in-depth guide to the different art pieces within the house and detailing in more detail the family history associated with the collection. They also have a virtual guide for visitors in addition to the volunteer room stewards present around the house. They also announced in 2021 the opening of a second shop within the house selling books related to the art works in the house and art supplies.

== Filming location ==
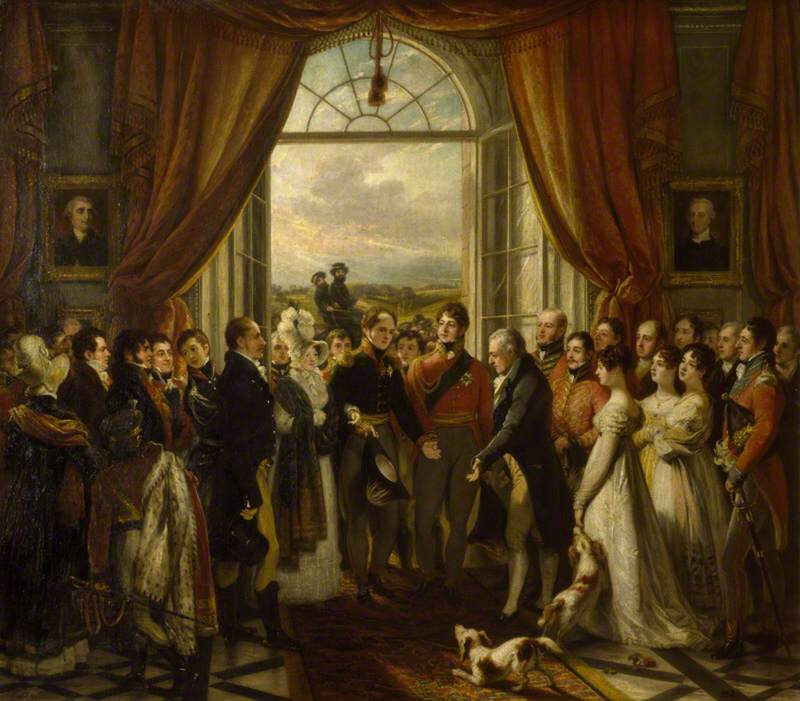
The Allied Sovereigns at Petworth by Thomas Phillips, 1817.

Petworth House has been used extensively as a location for film and TV productions. Included in the credits are Barry Lyndon (1975), Silver Bears (1977), Elizabeth: The Golden Age (2007), Maleficent (2014), Mr Turner (2014), Rebecca (2020), and Bridgerton (2022). Napoleon, starring Joaquin Phoenix and Vanessa Kirby filmed at Petworth in March 2022.
