= Midhurst Rother College =

Location
- North Street; Midhurst, West Sussex, GU29 9DT; England; 50.9907°N 0.7371°W

Information
- Former name: Midhurst Grammar School
- Type: Comprehensive; Academy
- Mottoes: Free to achieve, belong and contribute; The best in everyone
- Established: 1 January 2009
- Local authority: West Sussex
- Department for Education URN: 135760 Tables
- Ofsted: Reports
- Chair of Governors: Richard Carter
- Principal: Stuart Edwards
- Teaching staff: 60
- Secondary years taught: Year 7 through to Year 13
- Gender: Mixed
- Age: 11 to 18
- Enrolment: 1146
- Hours in school day: 8:30am-3:40pm
- Houses: Austen, Kipling, Tennyson and Woolf
- Website: http://www.mrc-academy.org

Midhurst Rother College is a coeducational secondary school with academy status for students aged 11 to 19, in Midhurst, West Sussex, in southern England. It was officially formed on 1 January 2009 following the closure of three predecessor schools in the area. It serves a wide rural area in the Rother Valley of West Sussex and is sponsored by one of the largest academy groups in the country, United Learning. The college also has partnerships with the University of Chichester and Winchester College.

== Formation ==
The academy was formed in January 2009. This followed the closure of three predecessor schools operating as part of a three-tier structure: Midhurst Grammar School, Midhurst Intermediate School and Petworth's Herbert Shiner School. The Grammar school - with a history dating back to 1672 - had accommodated students aged 13 to 19, while both intermediate schools had students aged 10 to 13.

The new school was introduced as part of the local authority's move towards two-tier provision. The school opened with students from Year Six to Year 13, but began to operate as a standard secondary from September 2009, with the youngest students being in Year Seven, aged 11.

== Campus ==
In September 2012, a new school building replaced the old on the River Site Campus at a cost of £31 million. Situated at the foot of the South Downs, the building is state of the art both in its architecture and the facilities it has to offer students, staff and the community of Midhurst. The facilities include a new school bus terminus, county-standard Astro Turf pitch, multi-use games area, Amphitheatre and extensive sports grounds. The formal opening ceremony, performed by Lord Andrew Adonis took place on 19 April 2013. Lord Andrew Adonis, Minister of State for Education 2005-2008, was the original champion of the academy concept and was directly instrumental in the College's early development. During his speech he said “I am delighted to be opening MRC which is transforming education in its community. Its results last year were spectacular and attribute to its principal, governors and staff.”

In a recent article written for the Academy Magazine by Lord Nash, Current Parliamentary Under-Secretary of State for Schools, he said about academy freedoms being at the heart of school improvement, "I have seen from my own experience that introducing strong performance management, professional development, coaching and reward can also make a huge difference ... Midhurst Rother College in West Sussex [as an example] ... has transformed management procedures since becoming an academy and has seen astonishing turnarounds in pupil performance."

== Curriculum ==
The school operates joint specialisms in Science and Mathematics. In addition, the school identifies aspects of Business and Enterprise, and ICT throughout the curriculum.

== Principal ==
The first principal of the College was Dr Joe Vitagliano, former headteacher of Chislehurst and Sidcup Grammar School. Dr Vitagliano was formerly a pupil at the Midhurst Grammar School.

The current principal is Mr Stuart Edwards.

== History ==
The origins of Midhurst Rother College date back to 1672 when, founder of education in Midhurst, Gilbert Hannam, set up a free school for twelve poor Protestant boys. The first classroom was in a loft, but later he moved the school to his own home which stood next door to the site on which the current College building is situated. Gilbert Hannam died on St. Patrick's Day, 17 March 1677 having set out foundations and traditions which are still followed today. Each year, on the anniversary of his death, in accordance with his Will a service is held in the Midhurst Parish Church at which scholars pray for his soul. During the service the member of clergy who delivers the sermon is presented by students with a fee of a pair of gloves. The tradition that the gloves ‘…are to the value of two shillings and sixpence and are presented in addition to a fee of twenty shillings…’
