= List of places historically in Lancashire =

This is a list of places within the historic county of Lancashire, England. It lists places within geographical Lancashire, rather than the 1974 creation of administrative/ceremonial Lancashire.

See List of places in Lancashire for places within the ceremonial county.

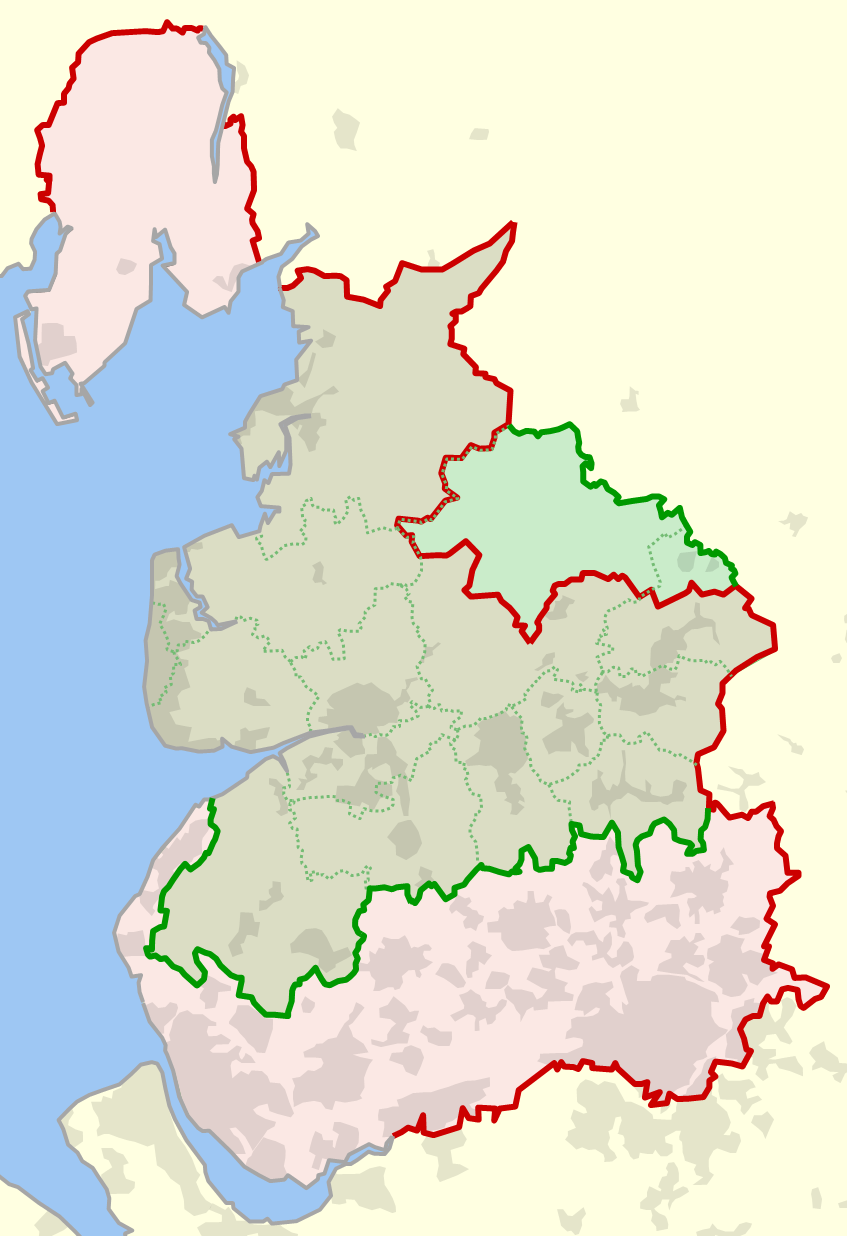
The boundaries of the historic county (red) compared to the ceremonial county (green)

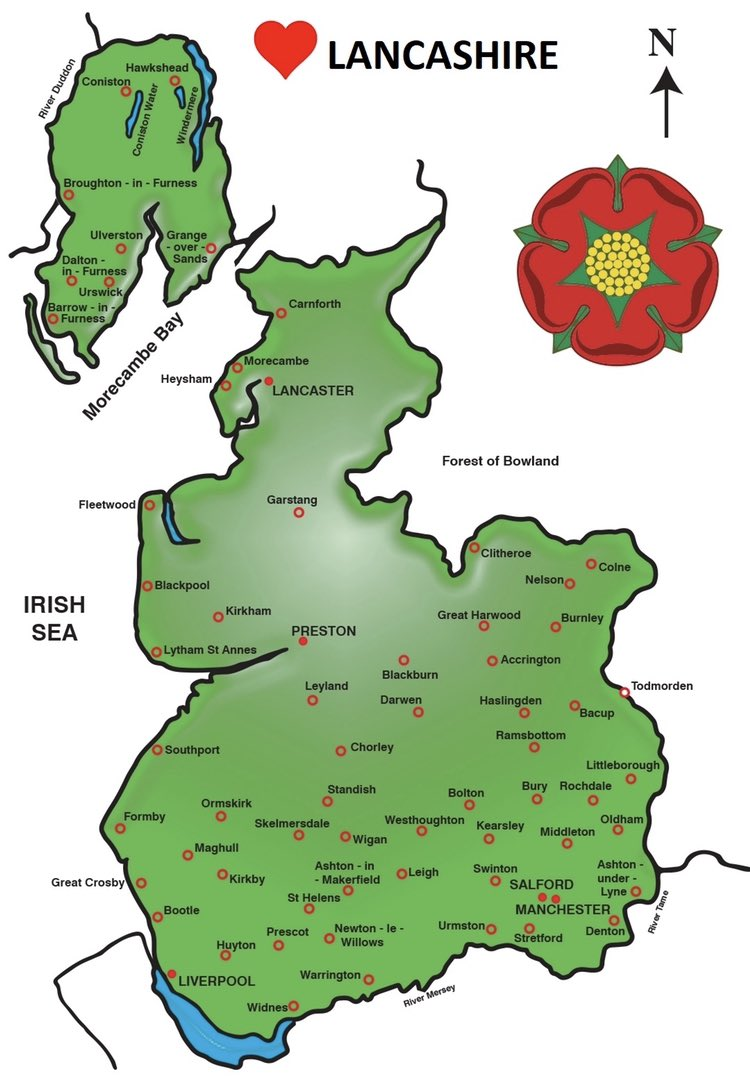
The historic county of Lancashire

== A ==
- Abbey Village
- Abbeystead
- Abram
- Accrington
- Acre
- Adlington
- Ainsdale
- Aintree
- Aldcliffe
- Aldingham
- Allerton
- Allithwaite
- Altham
- Ancoats
- Anderton
- Anglezarke
- Appley Bridge
- Arkholme
- Ashton-in-Makerfield
- Ashton-under-Lyne
- Askam and Ireleth
- Aspden
- Aspull
- Astley
- Atherton
- Audenshaw
- Aughton

== B ==
- Bacup
- Backbarrow
- Balderstone
- Bamber Bridge
- Banks
- Bardsea
- Barley
- Barrow-in-Furness
- Barrow Nook
- Barrowford
- Barton (Preston)
- Barton (West Lancashire)
- Barton-upon-Irwell
- Baxenden
- Belmont
- Belthorn
- Beswick
- Bickerstaffe
- Biggar
- Billinge
- Billington
- Birchwood
- Birkdale
- Bispham
- Bispham Green
- Blackamoor
- Blackley
- Blacko
- Blackrod
- Blackburn
- Blackpool
- Bleasdale
- Blundellsands
- Bold
- Bold Heath
- Bolton
- Bolton-le-Sands
- Bootle
- Borwick
- Bretherton
- Brierfield
- Brindle
- Brinscall
- Brockhall
- Broughton-in-Amounderness
- Broughton-in-Furness
- Burnley
- Burscough
- Bury
- Burtonwood

== C ==
- Cadishead
- Calder Vale
- Cantsfield
- Cark
- Carnforth
- Cartmel
- Castlefield
- Catforth
- Caton
- Chadderton
- Chapeltown
- Charnock Richard
- Chatburn
- Childwall
- Chipping
- Chingle Hall
- Chorley
- Chorlton-cum-Hardy
- Chowbent
- Church
- Churchtown (Garstang)
- Churchtown (Southport)
- Claughton-on-Brock
- Claughton (Lancaster)
- Clayton-le-Dale
- Clayton-le-Moors
- Clayton-le-Woods
- Clayton Brook
- Cleveleys
- Clifton (Fylde)
- Clifton (Salford)
- Clitheroe
- Cliviger
- Clowbridge
- Cockerham
- Collyhurst
- Colne
- Conder Green
- Coniston
- Coppull
- Copster Green
- Corner Row
- Cottam
- Cottontree
- Coupe Green
- Cowan Bridge
- Crawshawbooth
- Croft
- Cronton
- Crosby
- Crossens
- Croston
- Croxteth
- Cuerden
- Culcheth

== D ==
- Dalton
- Dalton-in-Furness
- Darwen
- Davyhulme
- Dendron
- Denton
- Didsbury
- Dinckley
- Ditton
- Dolphinholme
- Downholland Cross
- Droylsden

== E ==
- Earlestown
- Eccles
- Eccleston (Chorley)
- Eccleston (St Helens)
- Edenfield
- Edgworth
- Ellel
- Elswick
- Esprick
- Euxton

== F ==
- Facit
- Failsworth
- Fallowfield
- Farington
- Farleton
- Farnworth
- Far Sawrey
- Feniscowles
- Fleetwood
- Flixton
- Flookburgh
- Ford
- Formby
- Forton
- Foulridge
- Foxfield
- Freshfield
- Freckleton
- Fulwood

== G ==
- Galgate
- Garston
- Garstang
- Garswood
- Glasson Dock
- Glazebury
- Glazebrook
- Gleaston
- Golborne
- Goosnargh
- Grange over Sands
- Great Altcar
- Great Eccleston
- Great Harwood
- Great Sankey
- Greenhalgh
- Greenodd
- Gregson Lane
- Gressingham
- Grimsargh

== H ==
- Haggate
- Haigh
- Hale
- Halewood
- Halsall
- Halton
- Hambleton
- Haskayne
- Haslingden
- Haverthwaite
- Hawkshead
- Haydock
- Heapey
- Heath Charnock
- Heaton Chapel
- Heaton Mersey
- Heaton Moor
- Heaton Norris
- Helmshore
- Hesketh Bank
- Hest Bank
- Heyrod
- Heysham
- Heywood
- Higham
- Higher Walton
- Higher Wheelton
- Hightown
- Hindley
- Hoddlesden
- Hoghton
- Hollins Green
- Holmeswood
- Hornby
- Horwich
- Hough Green
- Howick Cross
- Hulme
- Huncoat
- Hundred End
- Hunt's Cross
- Hutton
- Huyton

== I ==
- Ince Blundell
- Ince-in-Makerfield
- Inglewhite
- Ingol
- Inskip
- Irlam

== K ==
- Kearsley
- Kenyon
- Kirkby
- Kirkby-in-Furness
- Kirkham
- Knott End-on-Sea
- Knowsley

== L ==
- Lancaster
- Laneshaw Bridge
- Langho
- Larbreck
- Lathom
- Lea
- Lea Town
- Leece
- Lees
- Leigh
- Levenshulme
- Leyland
- Lindal-in-Furness
- Litherland
- Little Altcar
- Little Crosby
- Little Eccleston
- Little Harwood
- Little Lever
- Littleborough
- Liverpool
- Longridge
- Longton
- Lostock Hall
- Lower Darwen
- Lowton
- Lunt
- Lydiate
- Lytham

== M ==
- Maghull
- Manchester
- Marshside
- Mawdesley
- Melling (Lancaster)
- Melling (West Derby)
- Mellor
- Mellor Brook
- Mere Brow
- Middleton (Rochdale)
- Middleton (Morecambe)
- Midge Hall
- Miles Platting
- Milnrow
- Morecambe
- Moss Side (Leyland)
- Moss Side (Manchester)
- Moss Side (Fylde)
- Mossley
- Much Hoole
- Myerscough

== N ==
- Near Sawrey
- Nelson
- Nether Burrow
- Nether Kellet
- Netherton
- Newbiggin
- Newburgh
- Newby Bridge
- Newchurch (Rossendale)
- Newchurch in Pendle
- Newton Heath
- Newton-in-Furness
- Newton-le-Willows
- Newton-with-Scales

== O ==
- Oakenshaw
- Oldham
- Old Trafford
- Ormskirk
- Orrell (Wigan)
- Orrell (Bootle)
- Osbaldeston
- Oswaldtwistle
- Over Kellet
- Overton
- Overtown
- Over Wyre

== P ==
- Padiham
- Parbold
- Pemberton
- Pendlebury
- Pendleton
- Penketh
- Penwortham
- Pickup Bank
- Pilling
- Pleasington
- Poulton-le-Fylde
- Preesall
- Prescot
- Preston
- Prestwich
- Priest Hutton

== Q ==
- Quernmore

== R ==
- Radcliffe
- Rainford
- Rainhill
- Rampside
- Ramsbottom
- Ramsgreave
- Rawtenstall
- Read
- Reddish
- Ribbleton
- Ribchester
- Riley Green
- Rishton
- Risley
- Rivington
- Roby
- Roby Mill
- Rochdale
- Rossendale
- Royton
- Rufford
- Rusholme

== S ==
- Sabden
- St Annes
- St Helens
- Salesbury
- Salford
- Salwick
- Samlesbury
- Satterthwaite
- Scales
- Scarisbrick
- Scorton
- Seaforth
- Sefton
- Shaw and Crompton
- Shawforth
- Shevington
- Shirdley Hill
- Silverdale
- Simonswood
- Singleton
- Skelmersdale
- Slyne
- Sollom
- South Turton
- Southport
- Speke
- Squires Gate
- Staining
- Standish
- Staveley-in-Cartmel
- Stockbridge Village
- Stretford
- Stubbins
- Sunderland Point
- Swarthmoor
- Swinton

== T ==
- Tarbock
- Tarleton
- Tatham
- Tewitfield
- Thistleton
- Thornton (Amounderness)
- Thornton (West Derby)
- Thurnham
- Tockholes
- Todmorden
- Torver
- Tottington
- Tottleworth
- Trawden
- Tunstall
- Tyldesley

== U ==
- Ulnes Walton
- Ulverston
- Upholland
- Urmston
- Urswick

== W ==
- Waddicar
- Walney Island
- Walton-le-Dale
- Wardle
- Warrington
- Warton (Fylde)
- Warton (Lancaster)
- Waterfoot
- Waterloo
- Wavertree
- Weeton
- Wesham
- Westhoughton
- Wennington
- Whalley
- Whalley Range (Blackburn)
- Whalley Range (Manchester)
- Wheelton
- Whiston
- Whitefield
- Whitechapel
- White Coppice
- Whitestake
- Whittington
- Whittle-le-Woods
- Whitworth
- Widnes
- Wigan
- Wilpshire
- Windle
- Winewall
- Winmarleigh
- Winwick
- Wiswell
- Withington
- Withnell
- Withnell Fold
- Woodplumpton
- Woolston
- Woolton
- Worsley
- Worsthorne
- Worthington
- Wray
- Wrea Green
- Wrightington

== Y ==
- Yealand Conyers
- Yealand Redmayne
- Yealand Storrs
