= Manor of Hougun =

Area in Cumbia, England

The Manor of Hougun is the historic name for an area which now forms part of the county of Cumbria in North West England. Only the southern band of land in the south of Cumbria was surveyed in the Domesday Book. The westernmost entries for Cumbria, covering the Duddon and Furness Peninsulas are largely recorded as part of the Manor of Hougun. The entry in Domesday Book covering Hougun refers to the time (ca. 1060) when it was held by Tostig Godwinson (c. 1026 – 25 September 1066), Earl of Northumbria.

== Location ==
The exact location of Hougun has been long disputed and Millom is often suggested, although High Haume near Dalton-in-Furness has also been proposed, given that it was recorded in 1336 as Howehom. It has also been suggested that the centre of the district was Furness, and that the territory included the Millom area, plus part or all of Cartmel – what would later be the Lancashire territory known as Amounderness. The notion that the manor of Hougun was an administrative district and not just the chief vill of the area has been challenged.

== Etymology ==
The name itself is commonly thought to derive from the Old Norse haugr meaning mound or hill. Island of Hougun (Houganai) was also the name given to nearby Walney Island at the western end of Morecambe Bay.

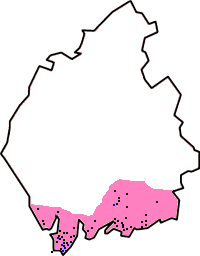
Approximate extent of Domesday coverage : the Hougun district, if indeed it was a district, may have covered the three peninsulas to the left of the pink area

== Domesday Book of 1086 ==
The Domesday entry for Hougun is therefore significant in indicating the extent of Norman control of the north-west, probably down to 1092, when William II of England took over Carlisle and northern Cumberland. North of the Hougun district, the land was part of Strathclyde/Cumbria, under Scottish overlordship. It has been suggested that the Domesday entry offers a snapshot of the "transition between the Anglo-Norse and Norman worlds in the 11th century", and suggests a largely self-governing area with a lack of the shire and wapentake structure that prevailed further south in England.

At some time before the shiring of Lancaster, Cumberland and Westmorland (which took place around 1157-1182), parts of the Hougun area had been split off. Furness Abbey was given the Furness peninsula; and St Bees Priory was granted land from the Norman lord of Millom around 1125. The Hougun entry is as follows (land is measured in carucates in the north, which is roughly the amount of land assumed to provide for one household for one year):

In Hougun Manor Earl Tosti had four carucates rateable to the geld.
In Chiluestreuic iii c., Sourebi iii c., Hietun iiii c., Daltune ii c., Warte ii c., Neutun vi c.,
Walletun vi c., Suntun ii c., Fordebodele ii c., Rosse vi c., Hert ii c., Lies vi c., Alia Lies ii c.,
Glassertun ii c., Steintun ii c., Clivertun iiii c., Ouregrave iii c., Meretun iiii c., Pennigetun ii c.,
Gerleuuorde ii c., Borch vi c., Beretsiege iiii c., Witingham iiii c., Bodele iiii c.,
Santacherche i c., Hougenai vi c.. All these vills belong to Hougun.

Hougun (?High Haume/Millom), 4 c., Tosti

- Chiluestreuic (Killerwick, lost, possibly directly north of Dalton), 3c.
- Sourebi (Sowerby), 3c.
- Hietun (?Hawcoat), 4c.
- Daltune (Dalton-in-Furness), 2c.
- Warte (?Thwaite Flat), 2c.
- Neutun (Newton, probably in Furness), 6c.
- Walletun (Waltoncote, was probably in Furness, lost), 6c.
- Suntun (?Sunbrick/Stank), lost, 2c.
- Fordbodele (Fordbootle, lost, possibly near Roose), 2c.
- Rosse (Roose), 6c.
- Hert (Hart, lost, probably was near the site of modern Gleaston Mill), 2c.
- Lies (Leece), 6c.
- Alia Lies (another Leece, lost, although may be "two different tax assessments for the same place"), 2c.
- Glassertun (Gleaston), 2c.
- Steintun (Stainton), 2c.
- Clivertun (Crivelton, lost, but might be near the modern Newtown), 4c.
- Ourgrave (Orgrave), 3c.
- Meretun (Marton), 4c.
- Pennigetun (Pennington), 2c.
- Gerleuuorde (Ireleth), but possibly "somewhere south of Ulverston and east of Dalton", 2c.
- Borch (?Broughton-in-Furness/Birkrigg), several possible locations might fit, 6c.
- Beretseige (Bardsea), 4c.
- Witingham (Whicham), 4c.
- Bodele (Bootle), 4c.
- Santacherche (Kirksanton) 1c.
- Hougenai (Walney), scribal error for Wagenai, 6c.

Ulvreston (Ulverston), 6c., Turulf

- Dene (Dendron), 1c.
- Bodeltun (Bolton-with-Adgarley), 6c.

Aldingham (Aldingham), 6c., Ernulf

Cherchebi (?Cartmel), Dwan from the King

Holecher (Holker), Orm from the King

Neutun (High and Low Newton), King's land

Bretebi (Birkby), Orm from the King

Further east, in what was later to become Westmorland, several other places are mentioned but with similar brevity. Most of the places are within the low-lying areas around the Kent and Lune valleys. Most of the entries are in two groups: the first is land around Kendal belonging to the King which had belonged to a Gillemichael before the Conquest; and the second is land belonging to Roger de Poitou and held by one Ernwin the Priest under him:

In Stercaland, Mimet, Cherchebi, Helsingetune, Steintun, Bodelforde, Hoton, Bortun,
Daltun, Patun. Gillemichael had them. There are xx c. of land taxable in them.

In Biedun Earl Tosti had vi c. taxable. Now Roger de Poitou has them, and Ernwin the
Priest under him. In Yeland iiii c., Fareltun iiii c., Prestun iii c., Borwick ii c.,
Hennecastre ii c., Eureshaim ii c., Lefuenes ii c.

King's land

- Stercaland (Strickland Roger)
- Mimet (Mint)
- Cherchebi (Kendal) [previously known as Kirkby Kendal]
- Helsingetune (Helsington)
- Steintun (Stainton)
- Bodelforde lost
- Hoton (Old Hutton)
- Bortun (Burton-in-Kendal)
- Daltun (Dalton)
- Patun (Patton)

Biedun (Beetham), 6c., Ernwin the Priest from Roger de Poitou

- Yeland (Yealand Conyers/Yealand Redmayne), 4c.
- Fareltun (Farleton) 4c.
- Preston (Preston Patrick/Preston Richard) 3c.
- Borwick (Borwick) 2c.
- Hennecastre (Hincaster), 2c.
- Eureshaim (Heversham), 2c.
- Lefuenes (Levens) 2c.

Brebrune (Barbon), King's land

Castretune (Casterton), King's land

Holme (Holme), King's land

Hotun (Hutton Roof), King's land

Cherchebi (Kirkby Lonsdale), King's land

Lupetun (Lupton), King's land

Manzserge (Mansergh), King's land

Middeltun (Middleton), King's land

== See also ==
- List of Cumbria-related topics

== Other sources ==
- Darby, Henry C. (1977) Domesday England (Cambridge University Press) ISBN 0-521-31026-1
- Maitland, F. W. (1988) Domesday Book and Beyond (Cambridge University Press) ISBN 0-521-34918-4
- Roffe, David (2000) Domesday: The Inquest and The Book (Oxford University Press) ISBN 0-19-820847-2

== Related reading ==
- Tristram Cole (2016) Tostig Godwinson, Earl of Northumbria (CreateSpace Independent Publishing Platform) ISBN 978-1482351439
- Stephen E. Harding, David Griffiths, Elizabeth Royles (2014) In Search of Vikings: Interdisciplinary Approaches to the Scandinavian Heritage of North-West England (CRC Press) ISBN 9781482207590
