= Whalley Range =

Whalley Range may refer to:

- Whalley Range, Manchester, England
- Whalley Range, Blackburn, Lancashire, England
