= Scales, Cumbria =

Scales, Cumbria may refer to:

- Scales, near Kirkoswald, Eden district
- Scales, near Threlkeld, Eden district
- Scales, South Lakeland
