= Alice Curwen =

English Quaker missionary, c. 1619–1679

Alice Curwen (c. 1619–1679) was an English Quaker missionary, who wrote an autobiography published along with correspondence as part of A Relation of the Labour, Travail and Suffering of that Faithful Servant of the Lord, Alice Curwen (1680). Her maiden name and parentage are unknown. She came from Baycliff in the Furness district of Lancashire (now in the Westmorland and Furness district of Cumbria), and spent part of her life as a missionary and social activist in New England and the Caribbean.

== Marriage and conversion ==
In about 1641, Alice married Thomas Curwen, also born in Baycliff. They joined the Religious Society of Friends in about 1652 during a mission to Furness by George Fox. Thomas was among 27 Friends from Furness and elsewhere in Lancashire prosecuted several times for interrupting priests and addressing their congregations. He was arrested in 1659 and imprisoned in Lancaster Castle for failing to pay parish tithes and seemingly on later occasions as well. Altogether, he stated in A Relation..., he spent eleven years in prison.

== New England and the Caribbean ==
Alice Curwen, who also emerged as a Quaker preacher, felt inspired by God in 1676, after her daughters Elinor and Edward had grown up, to travel to New England, having heard that Quakers suffered cruel punishment and even the death penalty in Boston. Her husband initially disputed that the command had come from God, but relented and accompanied her.

Over the next two years the Curwens were also active in Rhode Island and New Jersey and spent the period March to October 1677 proselytizing in Barbados, where Alice Curwen argued that black slaves had a right to attend Quaker meetings irrespective of their owners' opinions.

The Curwens also visited the nearby island of Nevis, where vestiges of Quakerism were reported in 1817 among slaves, long after all white Quakers had left. The group, known as Naohites, used the Quaker term "first-day" for Sunday, rejected payment for preachers, forbade gaudy dress, debt, stealing, lying, and swearing, and emphasized that the Spirit puts into people's hearts what they should do.

== Return ==
The Curwens returned to England, where they preached in London, the South-East and the East Midlands, as well as retaining their connections in Furness, especially Swarthmoor Hall and the meeting there. They were active in Huntingdonshire in the winter of 1677–1678.

Alice Curwen died suddenly in London on 7 June 1679 at the age of about sixty. Her husband intended A Relation... as an obituary compilation, to which he contributed an account of her life. It included a tribute by the fellow preacher Rebecca Travers, a notable Quaker writer of the period. One of the Curwens' children, another Thomas, became a glover in London. Thomas Curwen the elder was imprisoned in Newgate in 1679. He died in Blackfriars, London, on 1 August 1680 at the age of about seventy.

== External resource ==
- Alice Curwen's autobiography appears in David Booy (ed.): Autobiographical Writings by Early Quaker Women (Aldershot, England: Ashgate, 2004, "Alice Curwen", pp. 108 ff.) Retrieved 17 November 2015.
