= Aldingham =

Village in Cumbria, England

Coordinates: 54.130°N 3.100°W

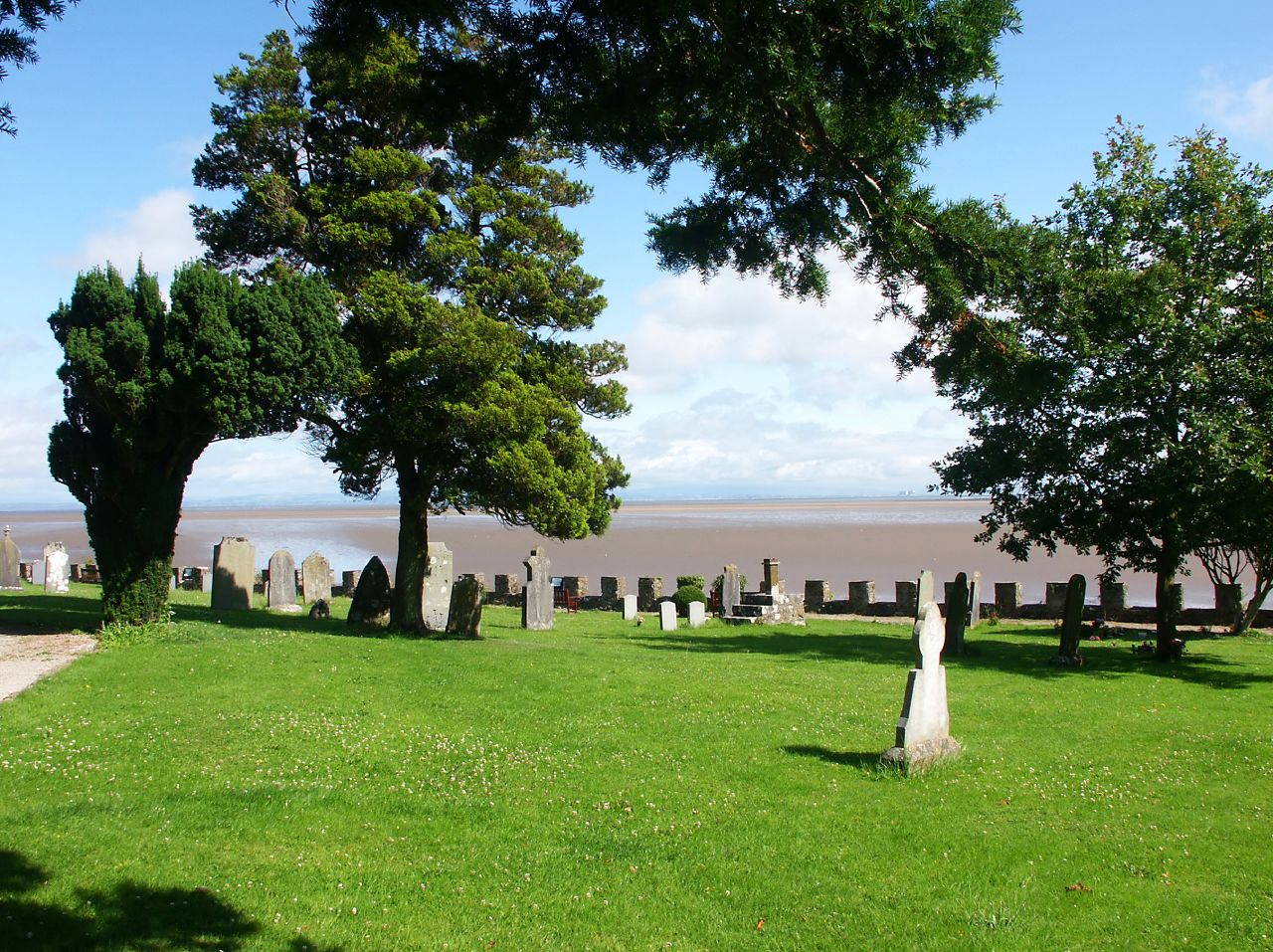
- Graveyard of St Cuthbert's Church

- Location in South Lakeland Location on Morecambe Bay Location within Cumbria
- Population: 1,105 (2011)
- OS grid reference: SD2871
- Civil parish: Aldingham
- Unitary authority: Westmorland and Furness
- Ceremonial county: Cumbria
- Region: North West
- Country: England
- Sovereign state: United Kingdom
- Post town: ULVERSTON
- Postcode district: LA12
- Dialling code: 01229
- Police: Cumbria
- Fire: Cumbria
- Ambulance: North West
- UK Parliament: Barrow and Furness

Aldingham is a village and civil parish in the Westmorland and Furness Unitary Authority of Cumbria, England. Historically in Lancashire, it is situated on the east coast of the Furness peninsula, facing into Morecambe Bay, and is about 8 miles (13 km) east of Barrow-in-Furness, and 6 miles (9.7 km) south of Ulverston. The parish includes the nearby villages of Baycliff, Dendron, Leece, Gleaston, Newbiggin, Roosebeck, Scales and a number of smaller hamlets. According to the 2001 census the parish had a population of 1,187, reducing to 1,105 at the 2011 Census.

== History ==
The village was mentioned in the Domesday Book as a separate manor belonging to a local man named Ernulf. The name is thought to be from the Old English meaning 'home of the family or followers of Alda'. Local folklore has it that the village was once much larger—almost a mile in length—but was washed away by the tide.

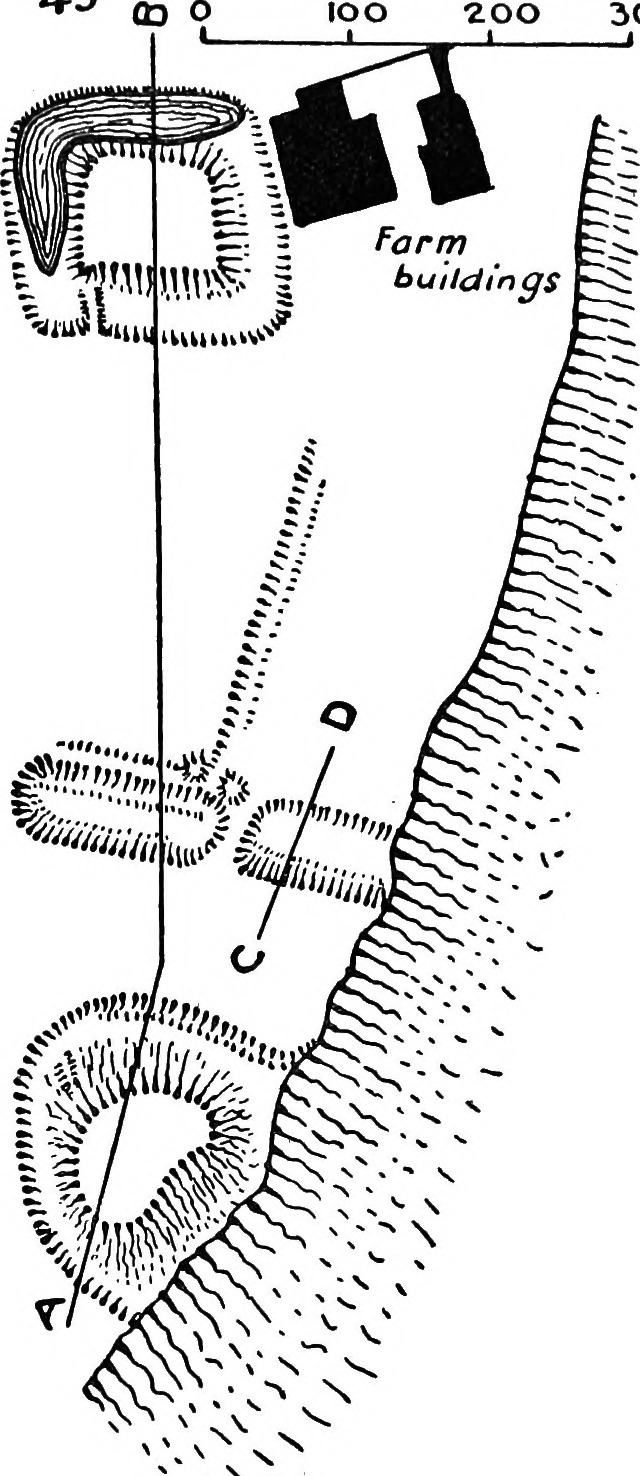
The eroded remains of Aldingham Motte (bottom of image)

From the early 12th century, Aldingham was the manorial seat of the Lords of Aldingham (later known as the manor of Muchland) and the sites of two early manor houses lie around a mile south of the present village. The first and most visible is Aldingham Motte, which was begun as a ringwork before 1102 by Roger the Poitevin and was later enlarged into a motte and bailey castle by the le Fleming family. It can still be clearly seen atop a sandy cliff overlooking Morecambe Bay.

A little further north, and now surrounded by Moat Farm is a rectilinear moat, which probably marks the site of a 13th-century hall. The site would have been abandoned when the Lords of Aldingham moved further inland to Gleaston in the 14th century.

== St Cuthbert's Church ==
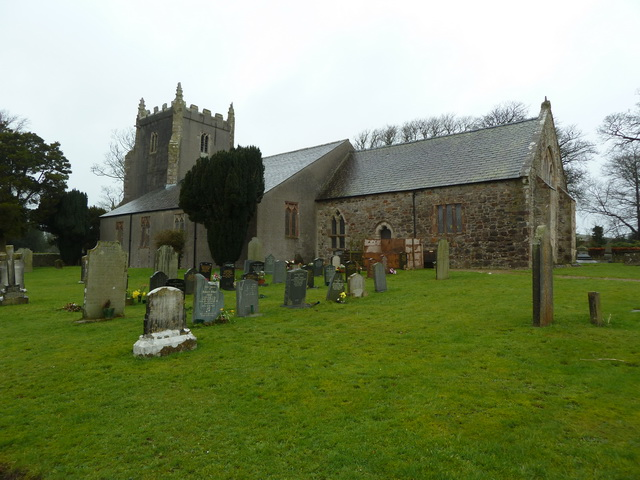
St Cuthbert's, Aldingham

At the centre of the present village, now on the shores of the bay, is St Cuthbert's Church. An inscription in Durham Cathedral gives the names of several places in the former Kingdom of Northumbria, including Aldingham, where the relics of Saint Cuthbert were kept in 875 by monks fleeing from Danish Vikings. It is known that during his life, Cuthbert held lands around Cartmel on the neighbouring peninsula across the Leven Estuary, although it is not known if his possessions extended this far west.

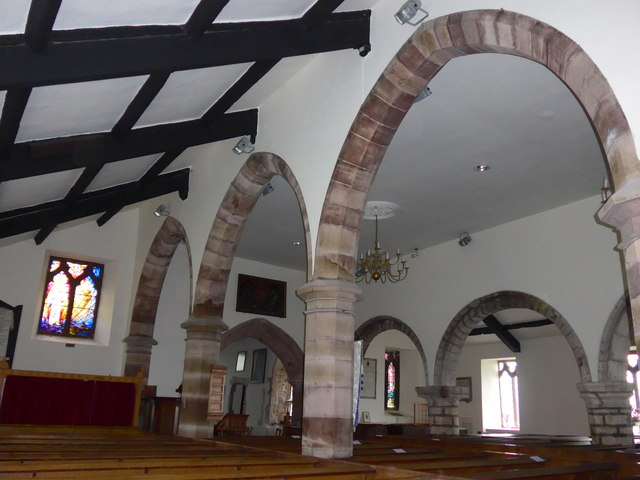
Medieval nave and aisles of the church

The building dates from the mid-12th century, with extensions being made to the chancel in the 13th century, the addition of the tower in 1350 and extensive restoration taking place in the 19th century and again in 1932. In the eastern wall of the chancel is a hole about 5 inches (130 mm) by 3 inches (76 mm) that goes right through the wall: it is believed this would once have been a place for local lepers to view the church services without having to enter the building.

== Aldingham Hall ==
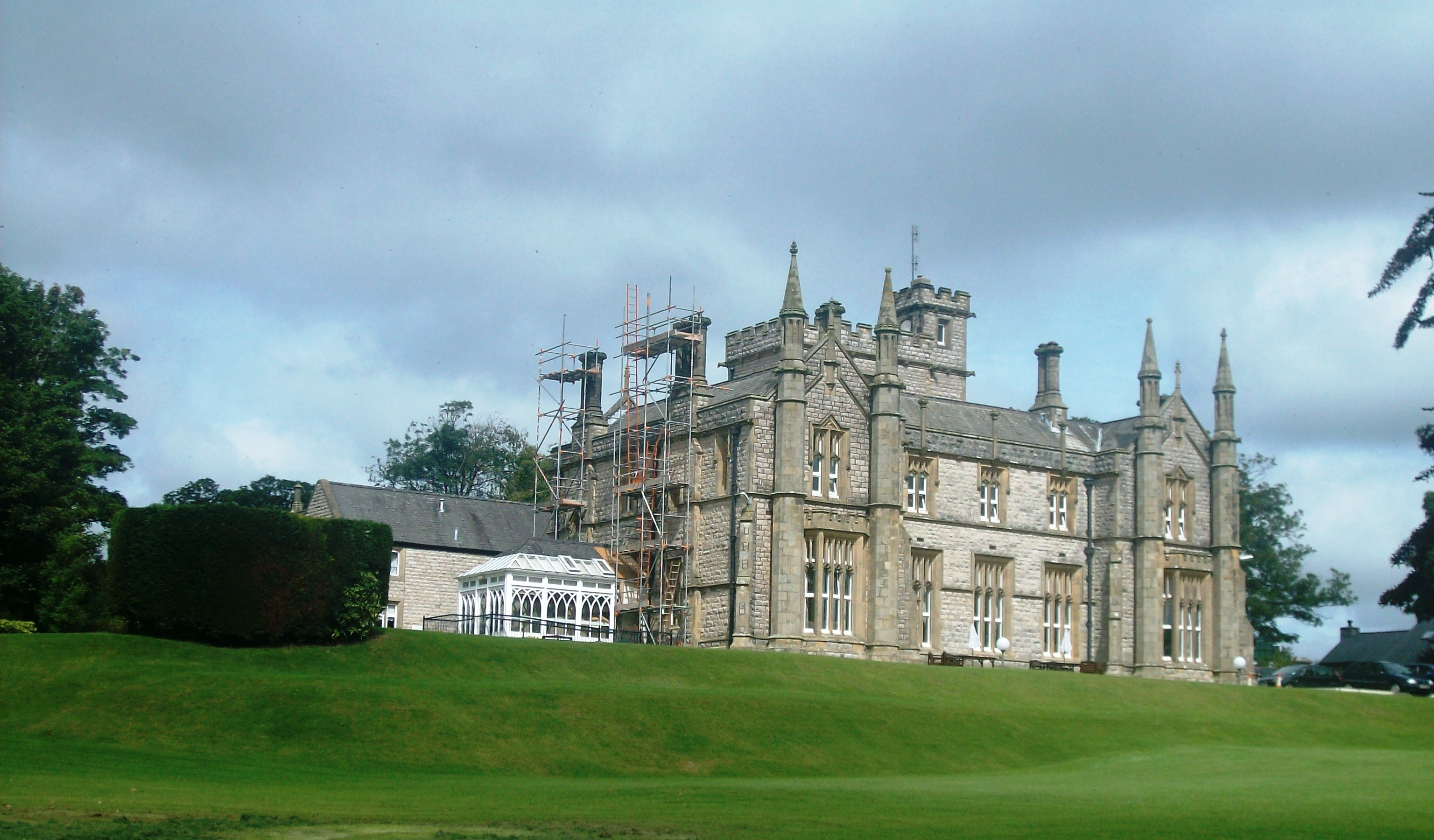
Aldingham Hall

The large building which stands opposite the church, called Aldingham Hall has no connection with the earlier Lords of the Manor. The magnificent building was begun in 1846 by Dr. John Stonard, then rector of the parish, and took four years to build. Stonard never saw it finished, however, as he died in 1849 and left it to his manservant, Edward Jones Schollick, who had reportedly saved his master's life on the sands of Morecambe Bay. Schollick became a local philanthropist with interests in shipbuilding and iron ore mining. He was unpopular, however, and emigrated to Australia in 1876. The hall has since been a convalescence home and is now a home for the elderly.

== Aldingham civil parish ==
The civil parish of Aldingham follows the boundaries of the ancient ecclesiastical parish and is approximately 18 square kilometres (6.9 sq mi). To the south and west it is bounded by Barrow Borough and to the north by the parish of Urswick. The eastern boundary extends some distance into Morecambe Bay to the low water mark.

The parish has a council of eight members and is divided into two wards. North Ward covers the villages of Aldingham, Baycliff, Scales and the hamlets of Sunbrick, Beanwell and Swinestead. South Ward includes the villages of Dendron, Gleaston, Leece, Newbiggin and Roosebeck, plus the hamlet of Goadsbarrow. The North Ward returns three members to the parish council and the South Ward returns five.

== See also ==
- Listed buildings in Aldingham
