= Roosebeck =

Hamlet in Cumbria, England

Coordinates: 54.097980°N 3.140705°W

Roosebeck is a hamlet in the Unitary Authority of Westmorland and Furness, Cumbria, England, on the north west coast of Morecambe Bay. It is in the civil parish of Aldingham.

Roosebeck is on the A5087 road, the coastal route from Ulverston to Barrow-in-Furness via Rampside.

A Wesleyan Methodist chapel was opened at Roosebeck in 1879, closed in 1962, and has since been demolished. In 1870 seven human skeletons, arranged in two rows, and a celt (stone tool) were found at Roosebeck.
