= Listed buildings in Aldingham =

Aldingham is a civil parish in Westmorland and Furness, Cumbria, England. It contains 28 listed buildings that are recorded in the National Heritage List for England. Of these, one is listed at Grade I, the highest of the three grades, one is at Grade II*, the middle grade, and the others are at Grade II, the lowest grade. The parish contains villages, including Aldingham, Baycliff, Dendron, Leece, Gleaston, and Scales, and the surrounding countryside. The listed buildings include houses and associated structures, farmhouses and farm buildings, churches and items in a churchyard, a ruined castle, a Friends' burial ground, a former corn mill, two village halls, one originally a malt kiln, three follies, and four limekilns.

== Key ==
| Grade | Criteria |
|---|---|
| I | Buildings of exceptional interest, sometimes considered to be internationally important |
| II* | Particularly important buildings of more than special interest |
| II | Buildings of national importance and special interest |

== Buildings ==
| Name and location | Photograph | Date | Notes | Grade |
|---|---|---|---|---|
| St Cuthbert's Church, Aldingham; 54.13018°N 3.09796°W | | c. 1190 | The oldest part of the church is the south arcade, the chancel dates from about 1300, and the aisles were added in 1845–46 by Edmund Sharpe. The church is built in stone, partly roughcast, and has slate roofs. It consists of a nave with aisles, a chancel, and a west tower. The tower has diagonal buttresses, a west doorway with a chamfered surround, a three-light west window with Perpendicular tracery, and a coped embattled parapet with corner pinnacles. The chancel has coped gables, buttresses, and a three-light east window. The north arcade is in Norman style, and most of the rest of the church is in Decorated style. | II* |
| Gleaston Castle; 54.13309°N 3.13177°W | | Early 14th century (probable) | The ruins of a castle with a rectangular plan. Parts of the four corner towers remain, together with a narrow gateway and part of the west wall. The remains are also a scheduled monument. | I |
| Low Farmhouse, Baycliff; 54.14187°N 3.09106°W | — | Late 16th century | The farmhouse is in rendered stone on a boulder plinth, and has a Welsh slate roof. There are two storeys and four bays, and a stair projection and outshut at the rear. On the front is a gabled porch containing side benches, and the windows are casements. At the rear are some mullioned windows in chamfered surrounds. Inside the farmhouse is an inglenook fireplace and a bressumer beam. | II |
| Friends' Burial Ground, Sunbrick; 54.15608°N 3.09450°W | — | 1648 | The burial ground is surrounded by stone walls about 2 metres (6 ft 7 in) high. The north wall has a coping of upright stone, and an entrance over which is a flat slab. On the north side of the burial ground is an inscribed outcrop of rock. | II |
| Low Sunbrick Farmhouse; 54.15468°N 3.09139°W | — | 1655 | The farmhouse is in pebbledashed stone, with projecting eaves and a slate roof. It has an L-shaped plan with two storeys and attics, and a front of three bays. Above the central door is an initialled and dated lintel and a hood mould. The windows are casements, and in the roof are two gabled dormers containing sashes. At the rear are two mullioned windows and a doorcase with an embattled lintel, all under hood moulds. | II |
| Baycliffe House; 54.14195°N 3.09143°W | — | 1659 | A pebbledashed house on a boulder plinth with slate roofs. It has three storeys, three bays, a lower extension to the right, and rear wings. The central doorway has a chamfered surround, a dated lintel, and a fanlight. Most windows are sashes, there is one mullioned window, and above the windows are continuous hood moulds. Inside the house is an inglenook fireplace. | II |
| ""1686", Gleaston; 54.12750°N 3.13974°W | — | 1686 | A pebbledashed stone house with a Welsh slate roof, two storeys and three bays. The central doorway has a chamfered surround and a dated and initialled lintel. Some of the windows are mullioned, and others are casements, all in chamfered surrounds. | II |
| Goadsbarrow Farm; 54.10657°N 3.13268°W | — | Late 17th or early 18th century | A house with outbuildings added later, it is in roughcast stone with a slate roof, and the buildings have an L-shaped plan. The house has four bays, and most of the windows are sashes, with one casement window. Over the doorway is a cornice on consoles, and above are two datestones. The outbuildings include a shed with two segmental-headed cart entrances and coped gables with ball finials, a barn, and a stable wing with a dated oval plaque, stable entrances and a pitching hole. | II |
| Tarnside House, Leece; 54.11423°N 3.15916°W | — | 1719 | The house was extended to the right in 1764. It is in pebbledashed stone with slate roofs and two storeys. The older part has four bays and a datestone above the door. The later part is higher with a moulded eaves cornice, three bays, a doorway with a cornice on consoles, and a central datestone. | II |
| Gleaston Watermill; 54.12863°N 3.13365°W | | 18th century | The corn mill, which was extended in the 19th century and continued in use until the 1940s, is in stone with a slate roof. The east front has three storeys and four bays. Most of the windows have segmental heads and fixed glazing. At the north end is the former wheelhouse. | II |
| Byre ranges, Low Sunbrick Farm; 54.15495°N 3.09173°W | — | 18th century (probable) | There are two byre ranges at right angles forming an L-shaped plan. They are in stone with quoins and slate roofs. The main range has two storeys and three bays, and contains doors and casement windows. The other range has 1 1/2 storeys and two bays, and contains doors, one with an elliptical head, a casement window, and has a weathervane on the gable. | II |
| Cart shed and stable range, Low Sunbrick Farm; 54.15491°N 3.09131°W | — | 18th century (probable) | The cart shed and stable are in stone, with quoins and slate roofs. There are two storeys, and each part has three bays. The stable has a central door flanked by windows, and above is a doorway with a semicircular head and ventilation slits. The cart shed to the left is recessed, and has two doors, a cart door with a segmental head, and ventilation slits. | II |
| Granary, Low Sunbrick Farm; 54.15480°N 3.09156°W | — | 18th century (probable) | The granary is in stone with quoins and a slate roof. There are two storeys, two bays, and a lower wing. In the ground floor are two doors and a casement window, and in the upper floor there are two mullioned windows. On the right return, steps lead up to a first floor doorway. | II |
| Limekiln, Scales; 54.14086°N 3.10949°W | | 18th century (probable) | The limekiln is a round stone structure built into a hillside. The fire hole has corbelled-in jambs and a lintel. | II |
| Sundial, St Cuthbert's, Aldingham; 54.12990°N 3.09804°W | — | 1753 | The sundial is in the churchyard of St Cuthbert's Church. It is in stone with a base in the form of a mounting block with three steps. On this is a square post carrying a square dated plate and a gnomon. | II |
| St Matthew's Church, Dendron; 54.12631°N 3.15421°W | | 1795–96 | The church was built to replace an earlier one of 1642, and is in Neoclassical style. The tower was added in 1833, and the church was enlarged in 1932–33. It is in pebbledashed stone on a plinth, with bands, an eaves cornice, and a slate roof. The church is without a chancel or aisles, and has a west tower. All the openings have semicircular heads. The tower has three stages, a west doorway, and an embattled parapet. Along the south side are five tall windows, and there are pediments on the west and east ends. The east window is flanked by blind oculi and niches. | II |
| Village Hall, Dendron; 54.12628°N 3.15352°W | — | 1795–96 (probable) | The village hall is in stone with a slate roof, and has two storeys and two bays. On the east side is a door with a semicircular head, and on the south side are two tall windows with semicircular heads. | II |
| Kitchen garden wall, Low Sunbrick Farm; 54.15475°N 3.09213°W | — | 18th or 19th century | The wall surrounds the kitchen garden, and is in stone. It varies between 7 feet (2.1 m) and 9 feet (2.7 m) in height. The entrance is in the centre of the east side. | II |
| The Old Rectory, Aldingham; 54.13039°N 3.09721°W | — | Late 18th or early 19th century | A house in roughcast stone with two parallel ranges, quoins, a cornice, and slate roofs. The north front has two storeys and three bays, and contains a gabled porch on four Doric columns with a round arch. Above the door is a traceried fanlight. Most of the windows are sashes, and some are casements resembling sashes. The south front has three storeys and five bays, sash windows, two Venetian windows, and a round-headed doorway with a traceried fanlight. On the east front, above an elliptical-headed window, is an angel corbel supporting a finial. | II |
| Limekiln, Gleaston Castle; 54.13168°N 3.13169°W | — | Early 19th century (probable) | The limekiln is in a hollow, and is in stone. It consists of a straight wall containing a fire hole with an elliptical arch, and low flanking walls. | II |
| Stonard Monument, Aldingham; 54.13036°N 3.09794°W | — | 1840 | The monument is in the churchyard of St Cuthbert's Church, and commemorates Rev. John Stonard and members of his family. It is in stone and consists of a tall hexagonal plinth with slate sides surmounted by a cap and an urn. The pedestal has carved inscriptions and family names, and it is surrounded by a square wall. | II |
| Aldingham Hall; 54.13027°N 3.09946°W | | 1846–50 | A large house in Gothic style, built in limestone with sandstone dressings, a parapet, and a slate roof with moulded copings. It is mainly in two storeys and has a symmetrical garden front of five bays. The outer gabled bays are canted, they project forward, and are flanked by polygonal buttresses with conical tops. The windows are traceried and have hood moulds, and above the windows are finials. On the north side is a gabled porch, and at the rear is a three-storey embattled tower with a higher turret. | II |
| Cattle shelter, Scales; 54.14463°N 3.11794°W | — | Mid 19th century | It was originally erected as a folly. It is built in drystone with thick walls and a stone vault. The ends have a semicircular plan and each has a semicircular-headed entrance. In the centre of the vault is a circular hole. | II |
| Cockpit (north), Scales; 54.14430°N 3.11706°W | — | Mid 19th century | The cockpit was built as a folly. It is in drystone with a stone vault. The structure has a circular plan with walls about 10 feet (3.0 m) high. There is a low entrance on the north side, a small opening on the south side, and a circular opening in the apex of the vault. | II |
| Cockpit (south), Scales; 54.14416°N 3.11736°W | — | Mid 19th century | The cockpit was built as a folly. It is in drystone with a stone vault. The structure has a circular plan with walls about 10 feet (3.0 m) high. There is a low entrance with a semicircular head. | II |
| Limekiln, Scales Haggs; 54.13760°N 3.10193°W | — | 19th century (probable) | The limekiln is a large stone structure with splayed sides built into the side of a hill. It has a segmental-headed fire hole, and a lean-to shed with corrugated iron roof. | II |
| Limekiln, Baycliff Haggs; 54.14512°N 3.10197°W | — | 19th century (probable) | The limekiln is a large rectangular stone structure built into the side of a hill. It has a round-arched fire hole, and the walls from the adjacent fields curve into the sides. At the rear is a rectangular gabled field shed. | II |
| Village hall, Scales; 54.14259°N 3.12029°W | — | 19th century (probable) | The village hall originated as a malt kiln and may incorporate earlier material. It is in stone with quoins, a slate roof, two storeys and four bays, and a former cart shed on the east side. Entry is by a ramp to the upper floor. On the west side are some original openings, some blocked, including segment-headed doorways. Some industrial items remain inside at the north end. | II |
