= Newbiggin, Furness =

Coordinates: 54.114°N 3.120°W

Newbiggin
- Village
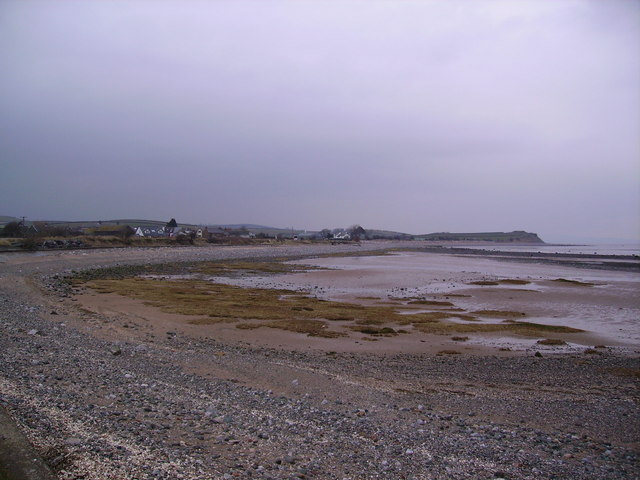
- Coast at Newbiggin

- Location in the former South Lakeland district Location on Morecambe Bay Location within Cumbria
- OS grid reference: SD267692
- Civil parish: Aldingham
- Unitary authority: Westmorland and Furness
- Ceremonial county: Cumbria
- Region: North West
- Country: England
- Sovereign state: United Kingdom
- Post town: ULVERSTON
- Postcode district: LA12
- Dialling code: 01229
- Police: Cumbria
- Fire: Cumbria
- Ambulance: North West
- UK Parliament: Barrow and Furness

Newbiggin is a village on the A5087 road, in the civil parish of Aldingham, in Furness, in the unitary authority area of Westmorland and Furness, in the ceremonial county of Cumbria, England. Historically in Lancashire, nearby settlements include the large town of Barrow-in-Furness, the village of Aldingham and the hamlet of Roosebeck.
