= Leece =

Village in Cumbria, England

Coordinates: 54.114°N 3.159°W

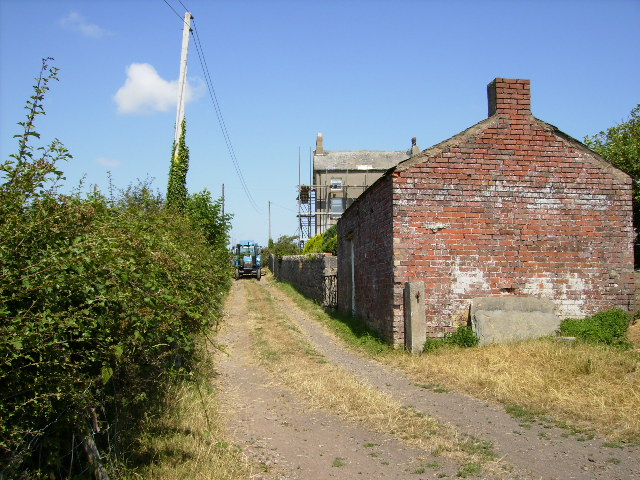
- Moss House

- Location in South Lakeland Location within Cumbria
- OS grid reference: SD242693
- Civil parish: Aldingham
- Unitary authority: Westmorland and Furness
- Ceremonial county: Cumbria
- Region: North West
- Country: England
- Sovereign state: United Kingdom
- Post town: ULVERSTON
- Postcode district: LA12
- Dialling code: 01229
- Police: Cumbria
- Fire: Cumbria
- Ambulance: North West
- UK Parliament: Barrow and Furness

Leece is a village on the Furness peninsula in Cumbria, England, between the towns of Ulverston and Barrow-in-Furness.

== Amenities ==
The village is built around a tarn and a village green, and Henry Armer & Son, a smithy established in 1914 that has since become an agricultural engineering business.

For parish council purposes, Leece belongs to Aldingham Parish Council.

== History ==
Historically part of Lancashire, the name Leece is probably from the Old English leah, which means 'woodland clearing', and the plural of which is Leas. It was recorded in the Domesday Book as Lies, in the Manor of Hougun held by Earl Tostig. It appears later in 1269 as Lees.

Leece used to contain the United Methodist Free Church. It was founded in 1881, but closed in 1912. The building, which was taken down in the late 1920s, can still be seen on some photographs from the period. The church did not have a cemetery. St. Matthew's Church, in the village of Dendron, built in 1642, also served the village, as both a church and a school. It was funded by Robert Dickinson, a citizen of London, who had formerly lived in Leece.

In the 1990s and 2000s, Leece played a part in the Lady in the Lake murder trial. Gordon Park, a resident of Leece, bludgeoned his 30-year-old wife Carol to death with an ice axe, then dumped her body in Coniston Water, telling police investigating her disappearance that she had left their home for another man.

== Gallery ==
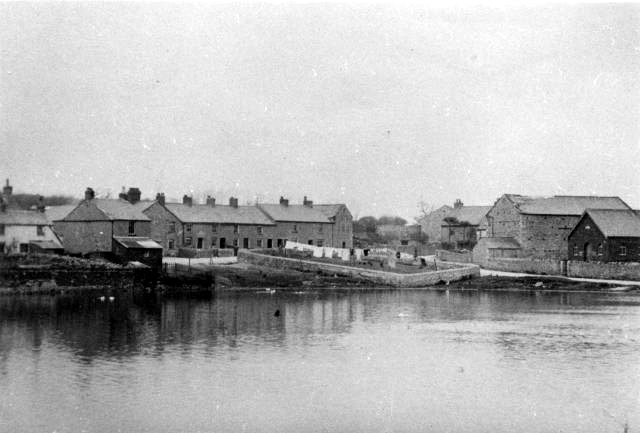
A postcard showing Leece, dated 1904. The tarn can be seen in the foreground, and the old Methodist church on the far right.

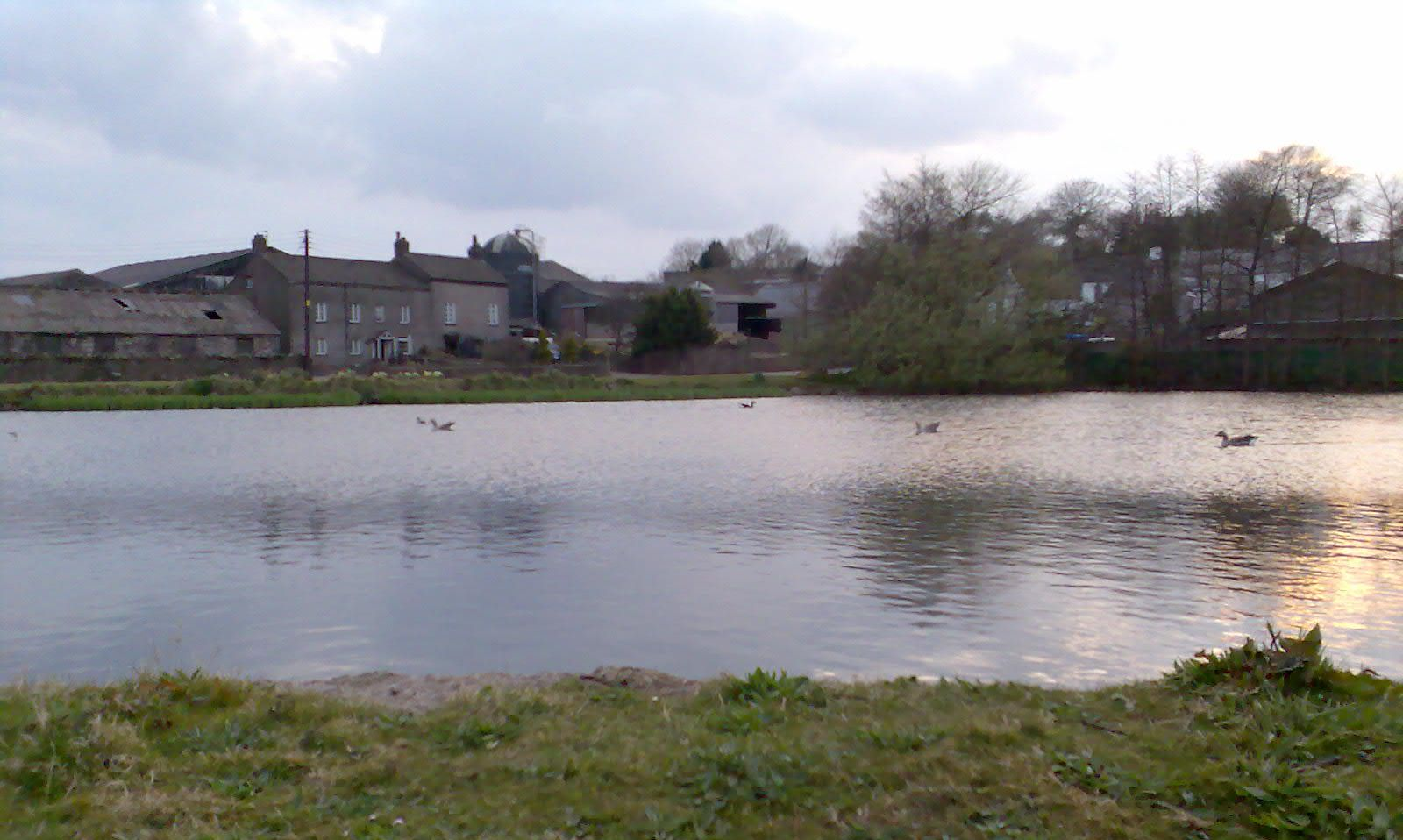
The Leece tarn in 2008.

== See also ==
- Listed buildings in Aldingham
