= Baycliff =

Seaside village in South Lakeland District of Cumbria, England

Coordinates: 54.14333°N 3.095°W

- Village
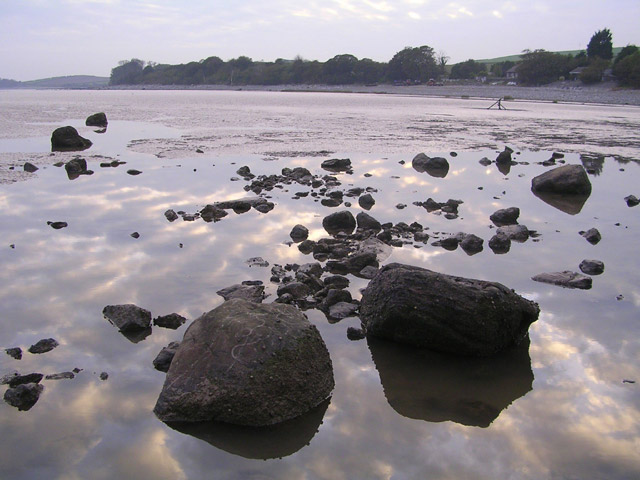
- Maskel Point

- Location in the former South Lakeland district Location on Morecambe Bay Location within Cumbria
- OS grid reference: SD2872
- Civil parish: Aldingham
- Unitary authority: Westmorland and Furness
- Ceremonial county: Cumbria
- Region: North West
- Country: England
- Sovereign state: United Kingdom
- Post town: Ulverston
- Postcode district: LA12
- Dialling code: 01229
- Police: Cumbria
- Fire: Cumbria
- Ambulance: North West
- UK Parliament: Barrow and Furness

Baycliff is a seaside village in the Westmorland and Furness unitary authority area of Cumbria in England. Historically in Lancashire, it lies 3 miles (4.8 km) south of Ulverston, in the civil parish of Aldingham. At the centre is a village green, and many of its buildings date from the 17th and 18th centuries. The two public houses, the Farmer's Arms and the Fisherman's Arms, stand close to the green.

== History ==
In the past Baycliff, earlier spelt Baycliffe, was a fishing and farming community. The industries of iron mining and local white stone quarrying provided employment for the men of the village. The iron was shipped to Backbarrow.

The village was the birthplace in about 1619 of the prominent Quaker preachers Alice Curwen (maiden name unknown) and her husband Thomas Curwen.

== Limestone ==
Baycliff limestone is still produced; the quarry beds produce two distinct stones. Lord is oatmeal coloured with dark cream markings; Caulfield is a buff stone with light coffee mottling. Both are versatile materials, used to create distinctive, durable floors and paving schemes, and in landscaping designs.

== See also ==
- Listed buildings in Aldingham
