= Gleaston =

Village in Cumbria, England

Coordinates: 54.127°N 3.140°W

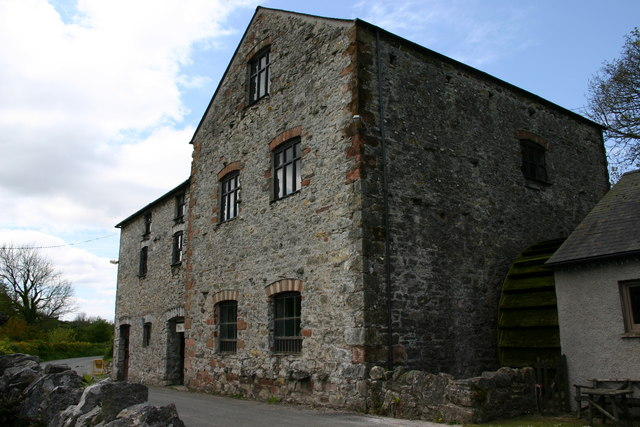
- Gleaston mill

- Location within Cumbria
- OS grid reference: SD255707
- Civil parish: Aldingham
- Unitary authority: Westmorland and Furness
- Ceremonial county: Cumbria
- Region: North West
- Country: England
- Sovereign state: United Kingdom
- Post town: ULVERSTON
- Postcode district: LA12
- Dialling code: 01229
- Police: Cumbria
- Fire: Cumbria
- Ambulance: North West
- UK Parliament: Barrow and Furness

Gleaston is a village with a population of around 400 in the Furness area of South Cumbria, situated between the towns of Barrow-in-Furness, Dalton-in-Furness and Ulverston. Historically in Lancashire, the history of the village can be traced as far back as the Mesolithic period and it was the centre of the manor of Muchland in the Middle Ages. Today it is largely a commuter village for the nearby towns, but its past is still visible in the remains of Gleaston Castle and Gleaston Water Mill, which is open as a tourist attraction.

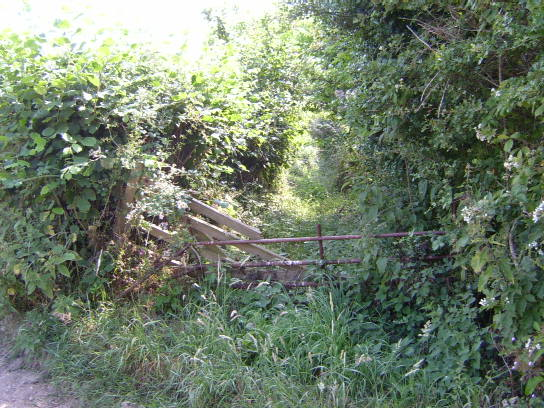
Eek Lonnin (also known as Hook Lane) just south of the village

== Toponymy ==
The Domesday Book of 1086 records Gleaston as Glassertun. Joan Lee suggests that this could mean 'farm by a stream' from the Brythonic glas and Old Norse tun, as there is a swift stream or beck running through the village. Alternatively it could mean 'green hill farm' from the Old Norse words glas - haugr - tun. It has also been proposed that the name was derived from the British words, glas, green, er, fallow or ploughed land, and ton, a town or village.

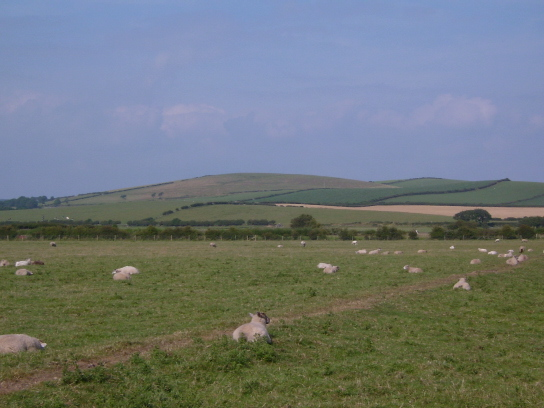
Beacon Hill from Hart Carrs Beck

== Pre-history ==
Archaeological digs in the 1990s brought to light the ancient history of the village. Mesolithic, Neolithic and Bronze Age artifacts were found and the position of a prehistoric lake, which once covered a field between the castle and the mill, was discovered, proving that the local area has been inhabited for thousands of years.

Since the Iron Age Gleaston would probably have been inhabited by the Carvetii tribe who were based at Carlisle and covered most of modern Cumbria, or possibly the Setantii tribe from Lancashire. Both were later incorporated by the Brigantes. Successive waves of Norse, Saxon and Norman invaders and settlers have all added to the history of the local area.

== Gleaston Castle ==
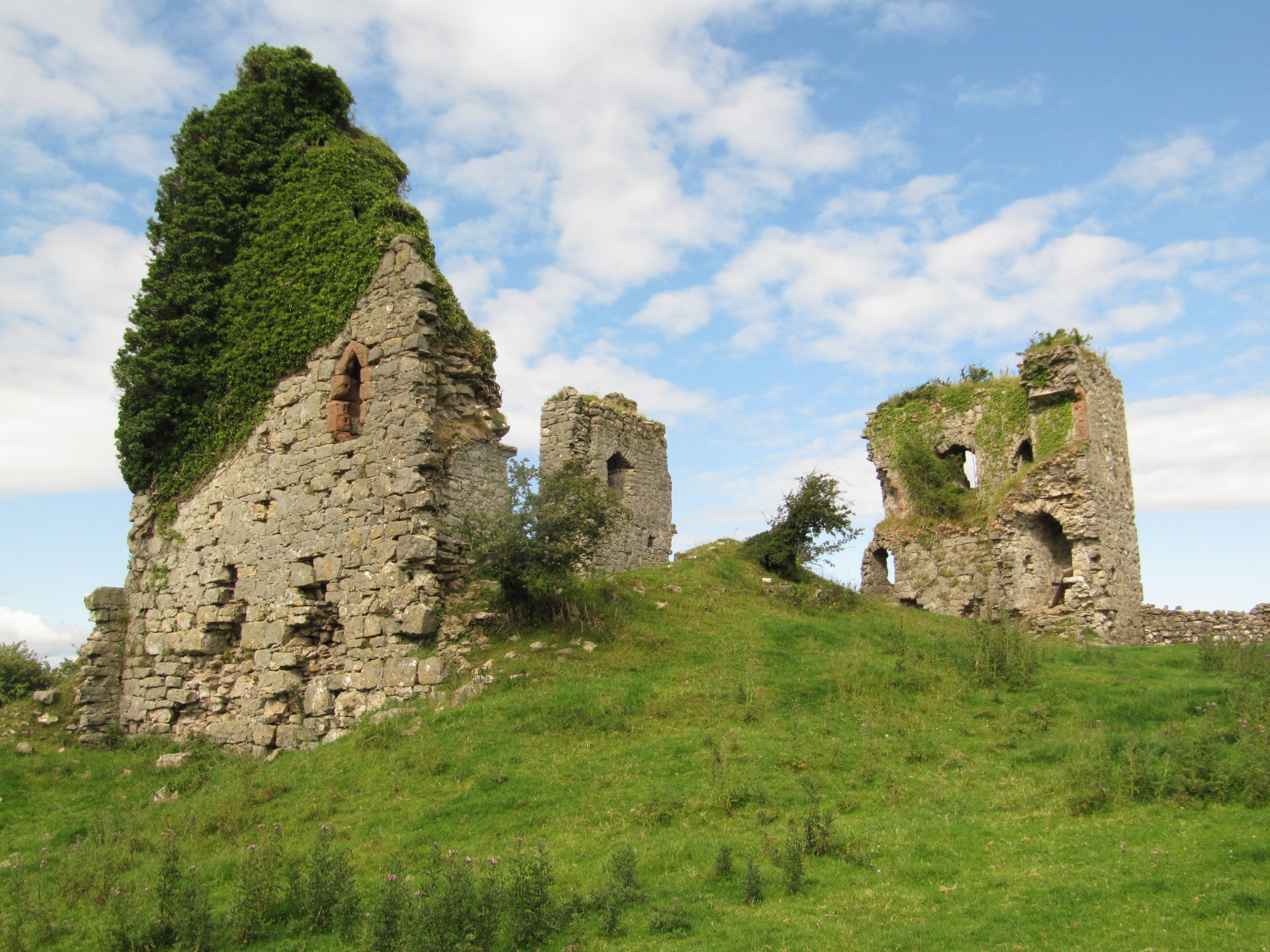
The ruins of Gleaston Castle in 2015

In the 13th century the Lords of the Manor of Muchland moved their seat of residence from nearby Aldingham to Gleaston and probably built a wooden hall on the site of the present castle, about 0.5 km north of the village. The building that stands today was begun in the 14th century by the first Baron of Aldingham, John de Harrington.

The castle consisted of a quadrangular courtyard surrounded by high curtain walls, with substantial towers at the four corners. The north western tower would have contained the great hall and lord's apartments. The castle was abandoned in 1458 when the family line died out and the manor eventually passed to the crown.

== Gleaston Water Mill ==
Just north of the village is Gleaston Water Mill. Now a tourist attraction, the mill would once have been used to grind oats for farmers throughout the Furness area. The present mill was built in 1774 on the site of an earlier one and its water wheel and milling machinery are still in working order. The Mill is privately owned and was restored in the early 1990s and preserved for posterity. Also on the site are the Dusty Millers restaurant and Pigs Whisper country store.

== The village now ==
Much of the village that can be seen today is 20th century. Since the 1960s the village has experienced a small scale population explosion. Previously there were five farms within the village itself as well as a pub, post office, Co-op and police station, most of which were 19th century buildings. The oldest remaining buildings all date from the 17th century and there are numerous 18th-century buildings.

Today, all the amenities and the five farms have disappeared and all the buildings have been converted into dwellings as Gleaston gradually became a commuter village for nearby Barrow and Ulverston. Most of the fields and large gardens in the village were also given over to development as pressure rose in the 1970s and 1980s to provide the growing number of workers at Vickers (now BAE Systems), Glaxo and Furness General Hospital with homes. Gleaston even has its own small estate called Mounts Meadow.

The village has its own large village green, a small football pitch which was made by Bryan Hindle and brothers Paul and John Clarke, a community hall and a children's playground, which are all owned and run by the villagers themselves. Every year a sports day and barbecue is held to raise funds and for locals to meet and enjoy themselves and the village has its own bonfire and fireworks display every November 5. In the year 2000, to celebrate the millennium a short walk was created in a small piece of woodland adjacent to the green, behind the beck.

== See also ==
- Listed buildings in Aldingham
