= Dendron, Cumbria =

Coordinates: 54.126°N 3.153°W

Dendron
- Village
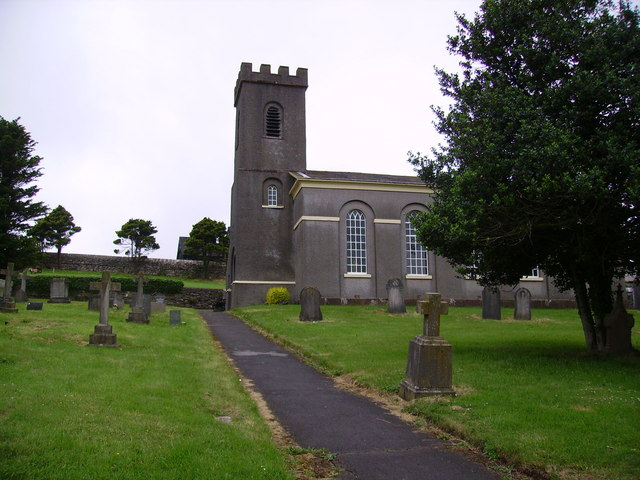
- St. Matthew's Church, Dendron

- Location in the former South Lakeland district Location within Cumbria
- OS grid reference: SD246706
- Civil parish: Aldingham
- Unitary authority: Westmorland and Furness
- Ceremonial county: Cumbria
- Region: North West
- Country: England
- Sovereign state: United Kingdom
- Post town: ULVERSTON
- Postcode district: LA12
- Dialling code: 01229
- Police: Cumbria
- Fire: Cumbria
- Ambulance: North West
- UK Parliament: Barrow and Furness

Dendron is a small village in South Cumbria, England. It is situated around three miles from the town of Barrow-in-Furness. The village was once just a collection of farms, but many of the old farm buildings have now been converted into houses for commuters working in Barrow, Ulverston and Dalton.

The village is mentioned in the Domesday Book as Dene, and the name is thought to mean sheltering place for deer - it is only a coincidence that it is the same as the Greek for tree.

== The Church and School ==
The most notable feature of the village is the 17th century St Matthew's Church. It was originally built as a chapel of ease in 1642, and it spent most of its early life as a school for the village children.

In 1652, the famous Quaker George Fox preached with some success at the chapel and noted that "no priest had ever preached in it" before this time. It was not until 1671 that a Minister was properly appointed to serve Dendron.

The renowned artist George Romney, born in nearby Dalton, was educated for a short time at the school but was removed in 1745 by his father because he had failed to make any progress.

In 1833 a new schoolroom was built opposite the churchyard, replacing what had once been a cockpit, and in the same year the vicarage was built. The schoolroom still stands today as a meeting room and Sunday school, but was replaced in the 1870s by another, larger building some distance south of the village in which were educated most of the children from the villages of Dendron, Leece and Gleaston. This building later became a primary school, but in 1994 it ceased to be a school at all when it was amalgamated with two other small rural schools into Low Furness C of E School in Urswick; it is now a house. Beside it stands a War Memorial commemorating parishioners lost in the First World War.

Dendron did not become a parish church until 1892.

== See also ==
- Listed buildings in Aldingham
