= Whalley Range, Blackburn =

Urban area in Lancashire, England

Coordinates: 53.753°N 2.480°W

Whalley Range
- Shown within Blackburn Shown within Blackburn with Darwen Location within Lancashire
- OS grid reference: SD684286
- Unitary authority: Blackburn with Darwen
- Ceremonial county: Lancashire
- Region: North West
- Country: England
- Sovereign state: United Kingdom
- Post town: Blackburn
- Postcode district: BB1
- Dialling code: 01254
- Police: Lancashire
- Fire: Lancashire
- Ambulance: North West
- UK Parliament: Blackburn with Darwen

Whalley Range is an urban area in Blackburn, Lancashire. The area is a community with almost all residents being of Indian or Pakistani heritage. Houses in the area are predominantly terraced and go up on a hill in a typical Pennine mill town style.
