= Scales, Aldingham =

Village in Cumbria, England

Coordinates: 54.141°N 3.118°W

Scales
- Location within Cumbria
- OS grid reference: SD269722
- Civil parish: Aldingham
- Unitary authority: Westmorland and Furness
- Ceremonial county: Cumbria
- Region: North West
- Country: England
- Sovereign state: United Kingdom
- Post town: ULVERSTON
- Postcode district: LA12
- Dialling code: 01229
- Police: Cumbria
- Fire: Cumbria
- Ambulance: North West
- UK Parliament: Barrow and Furness

Scales is a small village in Westmorland and Furness, Cumbria, England. The town of Ulverston is around 3.5 miles south of the village. The name Scales comes from the Old Norse skali, with an Old English plural *Scalas, meaning huts. It is in the historic county of Lancashire.

The village has a long history, proven when mesolithic human remains were discovered in a cave in a limestone outcrop known as Scales Haggs to the east of the village.

A fragment of gravestone was once discovered in Aldingham Church, which bore an inscription to one Goditha of Scales, who it appears was an abbess and was probably the daughter of the local Lord, Michael le Fleming.

The village was once home to a small local primary school called Aldingham Parochial School, which was closed down in 1994 and amalgamated with two other local schools. The symbol of the three interconnected circles is still clearly visible on the renovated building, now a house.

The village hall, officially called Aldingham Parish Hall is known to locals as The Malt Kiln and would once have been used to dry and ferment locally grown Barley into Malt for use in vinegar, beer and bread making. Until relatively recently, it was possible to see remnants of the old process in the building but it has since been renovated.

== See also ==
- Listed buildings in Aldingham
