= Furness =

Peninsula and region of Cumbria, England

Coordinates: 54.27004°N 3.08853°W

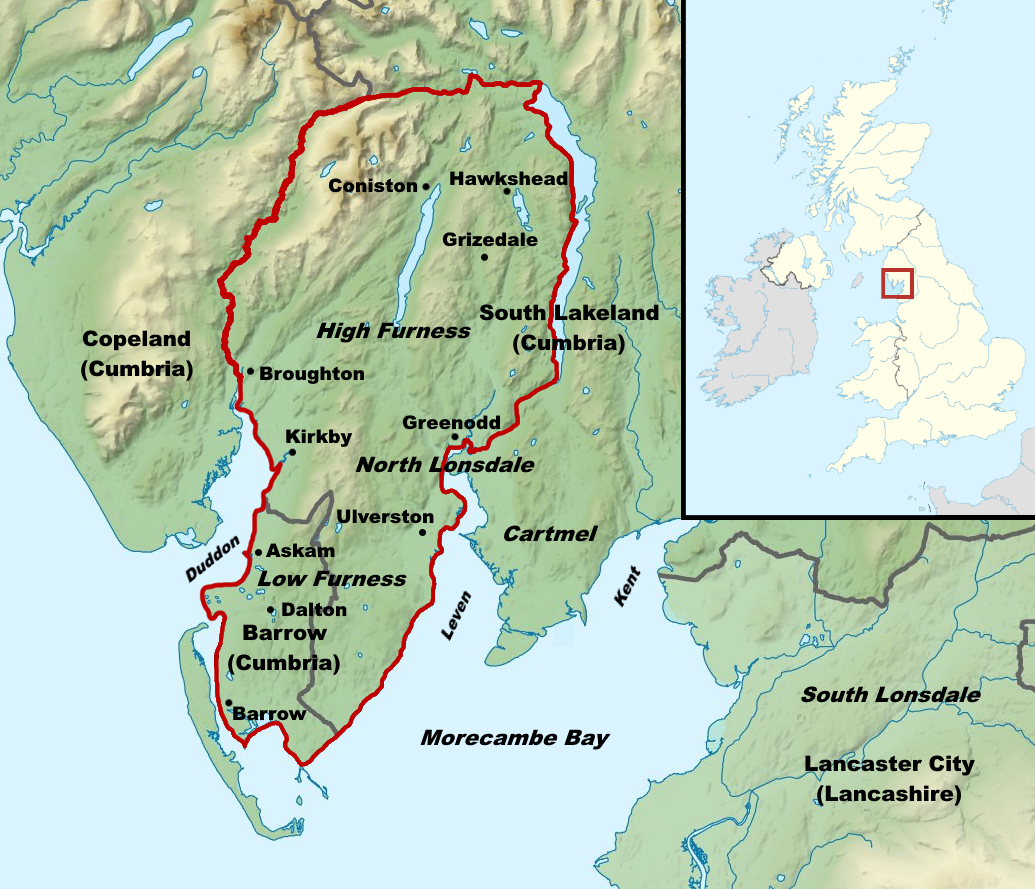
Furness, overlaid onto current administrative areas

Furness (/ˈfɜːrnɪs, fɜːrˈnɛs/ FUR-niss, fur-NESS) is a peninsula and region of Cumbria, England. Together with the Cartmel Peninsula it forms North Lonsdale, historically an exclave of Lancashire. On 1 April 2023 it became part of the new unitary authority of Westmorland and Furness.

The Furness Peninsula, also known as Low Furness, is an area of villages, agricultural land and low-lying moorland, with the industrial town of Barrow-in-Furness at its head. The peninsula is bordered by the estuaries of the River Duddon to the west and the River Leven in Morecambe Bay to the east. The wider region of Furness consists of the peninsula and the area known as High Furness, which is a relatively mountainous and sparsely populated part of England, extending inland into the Lake District and containing the Furness Fells. The inland boundary of the region is formed by the rivers Leven, Brathay and Duddon, and the lake of Windermere. Off the southern tip of Furness is Walney Island, 11 miles (18 kilometres) long, as well as several smaller islands.

Barrow-in-Furness, which developed when the Furness iron industry flourished in the 19th century, is the region's largest settlement, with a population of over 91,000. The remainder of Furness is predominantly rural, with Ulverston the only other settlement with more than 10,000 people. Much of High Furness consists of moorland, mountain or woodland environments.

== Etymology ==
The name, which is first recorded in 1150 as Fuththernessa, is interpreted as "headland by the rump-shaped island," from Old Norse futh (genitive futhar), meaning rump, and nes, meaning headland. The island in question may be Piel Island, with the name originally referring to the headland immediately opposite (where Rampside is), before being extended to the entire region. Alternatively it could be Walney Island: though it little resembles a rump today, erosion could have altered its shape over time.

== Geography ==
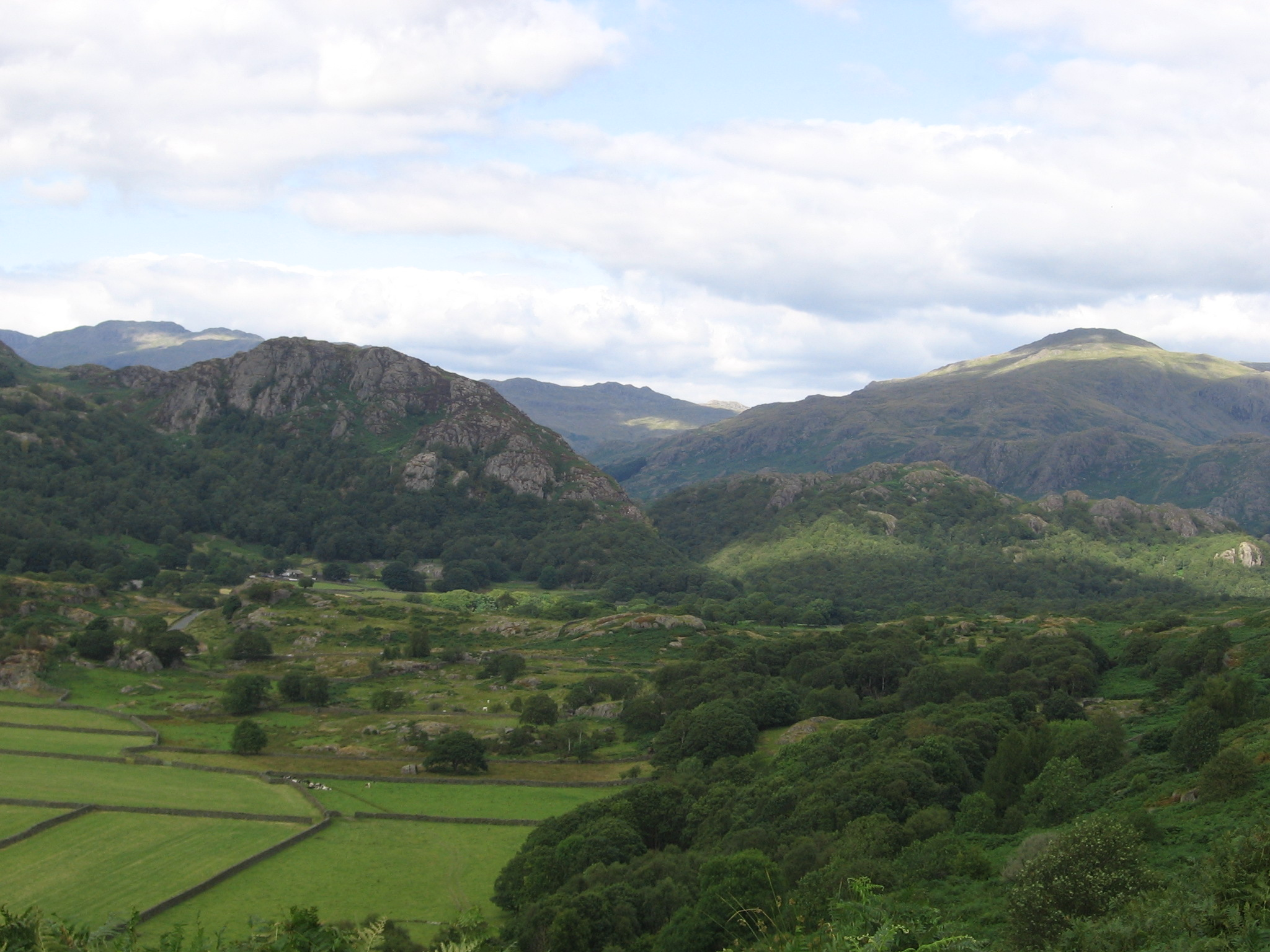
View from the slopes of Dow Crag in the Coniston Fells.

Furness's border follows the River Duddon up to Wrynose Pass, and then the Brathay until it flows into Windermere. The mere forms most of the eastern boundary, with the rest being made up of the Leven, from its source at Windermere's southern tip to its mouth at Morecambe Bay. In total Furness has an area of about 250 square miles (650 square kilometres).

The Furness Fells are formed of Ordovician volcanic rocks, and Silurian shales and slates to the south. They are cut through by Windermere, Coniston Water, and numerous valleys which drain into the Esk, the Duddon, and Morecambe Bay. The higher ground is rocky heathland, with frequent tarns, while the lower ground supports pasture and woodland. In the east there are two main chains of hills: one overlooking Windermere, with Latterbarrow (245 m) as its highest point, and the other, which reaches 300 m, overlooking Coniston Water. Between them is flat country and Esthwaite Water. West of Coniston Water is the highest range, the Coniston Fells, with the Coniston Old Man (803 m) as its highest point (and historically the highest point in Lancashire). A lesser range extends from Torver to just north of Dalton, but south of that the landscape is flat; this area is also called Plain Furness. The low rolling hills of Low Furness are formed of glacial deposits, mainly boulder clay, above Triassic sandstone and Carboniferous limestone. There are large deposits of iron ore here, of very pure quality.

The human geography of the area is dominated by the town of Barrow-in-Furness. Barrow is located on the tip of the peninsula and Walney Island, and the Borough of Barrow-in-Furness, which includes the small town of Dalton-in-Furness has a population of 69,100. Barrow, which grew from a small village to a large town during the 19th century, is characterized by a grid pattern of streets of terraced houses, surrounded by more contemporary suburbs. Though the Royal Port of Barrow still contains much industry, there has also been significant redevelopment of former dock areas into retail parks, office blocks and spaces of light industry. The other major town in the area is Ulverston, at the border of Low and High Furness, and the population of Ulverston and its surrounding villages is 17,307. The corridor along the main A590 road between Ulverston and Barrow is relatively densely populated and urban. Despite decline, industry remains a bigger employer in this part of Furness than most of the UK, with BAE Systems, Kimberly-Clark (both Barrow) and GlaxoSmithKline (Ulverston) the largest employers. In Barrow and up the west coast of Furness, the Sellafield Nuclear site is also a significant employer. The rest of Furness is rural, with the mountainous, wooded and lacustrine environments. To the west, the main settlements of Kirkby-in-Furness and Broughton-in-Furness are dominated by farming and commuting. The Lake District National Park covers most of High Furness, with Coniston and Hawkshead the main centres for tourism, while major tourist attractions include Grizedale Forest, the Aquarium of the Lakes, South Lakes Safari Zoo and the Lakeside and Haverthwaite Railway. The northern and eastern communities of Furness share more in common with the Lake District towns of Ambleside and Bowness, outside of the region, than with the more urban areas of Low Furness. Mining was once a major part of the local economy, but today only the Burlington Slate Quarries at Kirkby remain of note.

The A590 is the main road into the region from the M6 Motorway. The A595 is the main route up the western coast of Furness, and the A593/A5084 run north-south from Low Furness to High Furness. The Furness Line provides railway connections to the West Coast Mainline through the south of Furness, and the Cumbria Coast Line is a slow rural branch line with services running north to Copeland and Carlisle. The Windermere Ferry in the east of Furness is England's only vehicular lake ferry.

== History ==
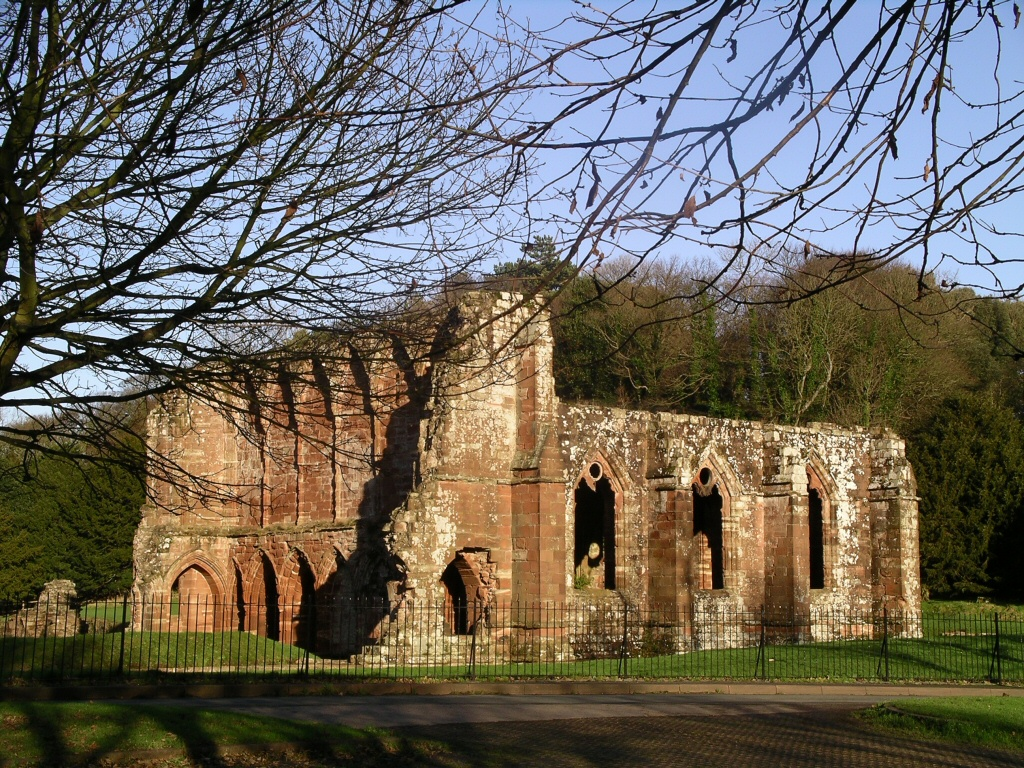
The ruins of Furness Abbey, just north of Barrow

Evidence of Neolithic settlements in Furness mainly comes from Heaning Wood Bone Cave, where evidence has been found of burials from the Mesolithic, Neolithic and Bronze Age. A human bone and a periwinkle shell bead found there are around 11,000 years old, and represent the oldest bones found in Northern England. Birkrigg stone circle, near to the burial caves, is thought to be around 4000 years old.

Despite this, Furness seems to have been scantly populated in ancient times. A handful of Brittonic placenames survive around Barrow, suggesting this part was settled earliest. Anglo-Saxons arrived in Low Furness in the 7th century, but do not seem to have spread to High Furness, which remained almost empty until it was populated by incoming Scandinavians in the 10th century. It has been suggested that they had a small mountain kingdom there, centred on Coniston (which means "king's town"). The prevalence of names with the element "thwaite" in High Furness (from Norse thveit, "clearing"), and the absence thereof in Low Furness, suggests that the latter had already been deforested by the time the Scandinavians arrived. Scandinavians probably formed the majority of the Furness population, and Old Norse remained a living language in the region until at least the late 12th century.

Before the Conquest, Furness, assessed to contain 82 ploughlands, was part of the Manor of Hougun, held by Tostig, Earl of Northumbria. By 1086, Furness was in the possession of the crown. In 1127 Prince Stephen founded Furness Abbey, granting the abbot most of the land in Furness and giving the rest to a Fleming named Michael. Henry III later granted the rent due from the lord of Michael's Land (£10 per year) to the abbot of Furness, making him the sole tenant-in-chief, and thus one of the most powerful abbots in the country.

In the 14th century Dalton Castle and Piel Castle were built by the abbots of Furness to defend the market town of Dalton and the port of Barrow respectively. The area had been raided by Scots in 1316 and again in 1322, though in the latter year the abbot paid Robert the Bruce a ransom to stop his men harrying Low Furness.

The pretender Lambert Simnel landed with his army at Piel Island in 1487. A few locals joined him, including Sir Thomas Broughton of Broughton Tower, who would be killed at the disastrous Battle of Stoke Field.

The abbey was closed in 1536 after the monks lent their support to the Pilgrimage of Grace, and the abbot's lands were seized by the crown, becoming part of the royal duchy of Lancaster. Later they were granted to the dukes of Buccleuch and Devonshire.

In May 1643, Furness was occupied and plundered by a large Royalist force commanded by Richard Viscount Molyneux. Later that year they prepared to march to the relief of Thurland Castle in South Lonsdale, then besieged by Colonel Rigby, but Rigby took some of his men over the sands and met the Royalists at Lindal, where they were routed. The Parliamentarians looted the Dalton neighbourhood before retreating to Cartmel the same night. In 1644 the Royalists remained in control of Furness, though the country folk were hostile to them, and Parliament ships landed at Piel Island to aid in a rising. After a fight at Hawcoat the resistance was quashed, and the Parliament ships left for Liverpool. After collecting the king's rents, the Royalists left for Cartmel. After the Restoration of the monarchy, one Furness landowner, Colonel Sawry, attempted a rising.

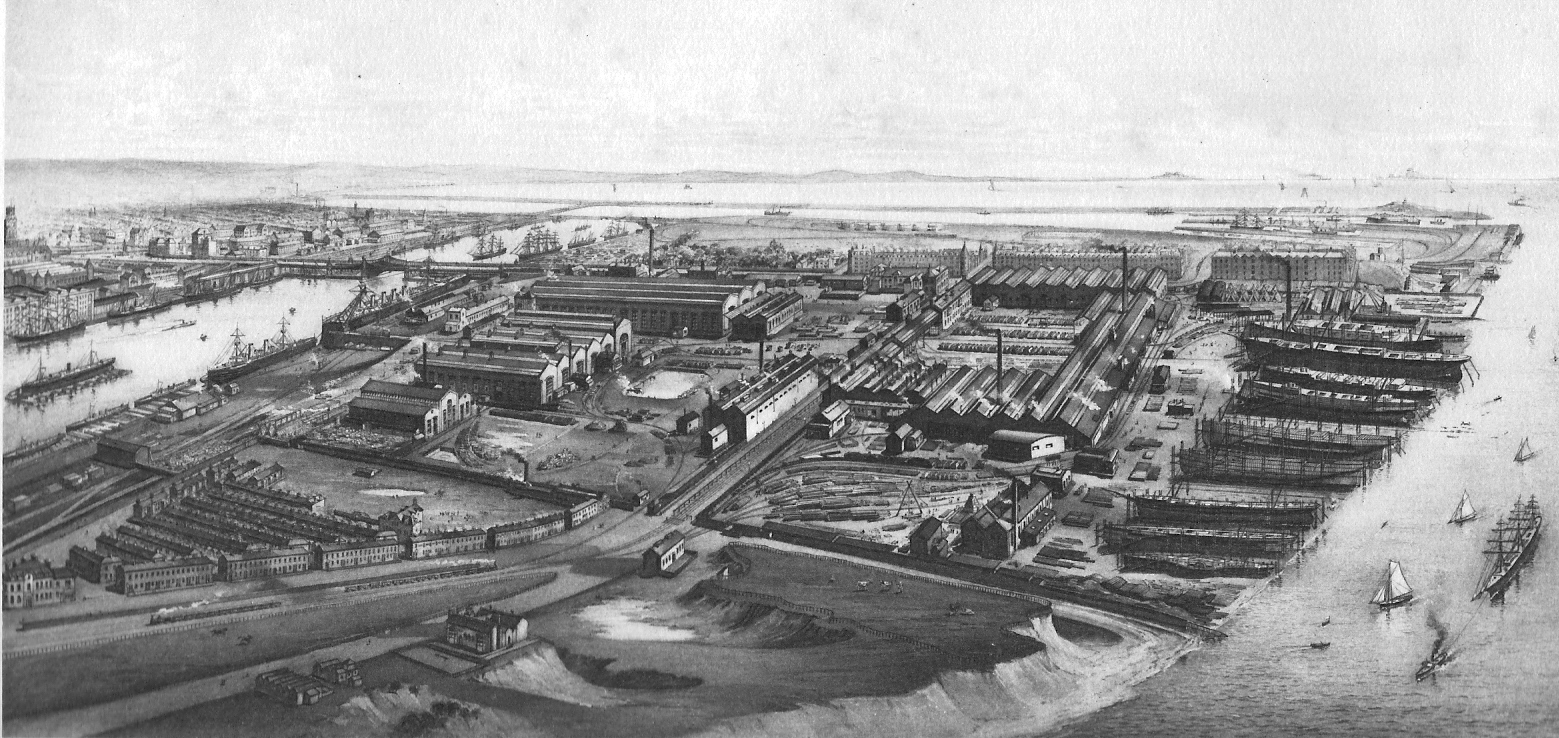
Barrow Island in 1890

Iron had been mined in Furness since prehistory, and by the late 18th century ore was being exported from Barrow. The Furness Railway was built in the 19th century to cater to the increasing demand. Iron and steelworks were established at Barrow, and the town's population grew from 325 in 1847 to 51,712 in 1891, surpassing Dalton's and Ulverston's. Mining in Furness reached its peak in 1882, when 1,408,693 tons of ore were won. At the same time, tourism in the Lake District increased, popularised in part by the work of John Ruskin and William Wordsworth.

Tourism in High Furness was promoted by the writings of Beatrix Potter in the early 20th century. Potter was one of the largest landowners in the area, eventually donating her many properties to the National Trust.

Shipbuilding later replaced iron and steel as Low Furness's main industry, and Barrow's shipyards became the largest in England. In particular, submarine development became a specialty of the town, with the Royal Navy's first submarines built there. During the wars this allowed Furness to escape many of the economic problems that other areas suffered, due to the constant work provided by the military.

After World War II demand for ships and submarines remained high, while the development of the Lake District National Park further fostered tourism. Attractions such as the Lakeside and Haverthwaite Railway, steamers on Windermere and Coniston Water, and fell walking, caused parts of Furness to become dependent on the tourist trade.

In the early 1990s, the decline of shipbuilding led to mass redundancies in the area. The shipyard's employment figures fell from 20,000 to 3,000 in a 20-year period. However, the shipyard at Barrow remains England's busiest and the only nuclear submarine facility in the country. Tourism has increased even more, with the Aquarium of the Lakes and South Lakes Safari Zoo among the newer attractions.

Transport has become an increasingly controversial issue, with conservation groups and local business clashing over the need for improvements to the A590 trunk road, the main link to the M6 Motorway. Proposals for a road bridge over Morecambe Bay have appeared, but are yet to progress beyond the planning stages.

== Administration ==
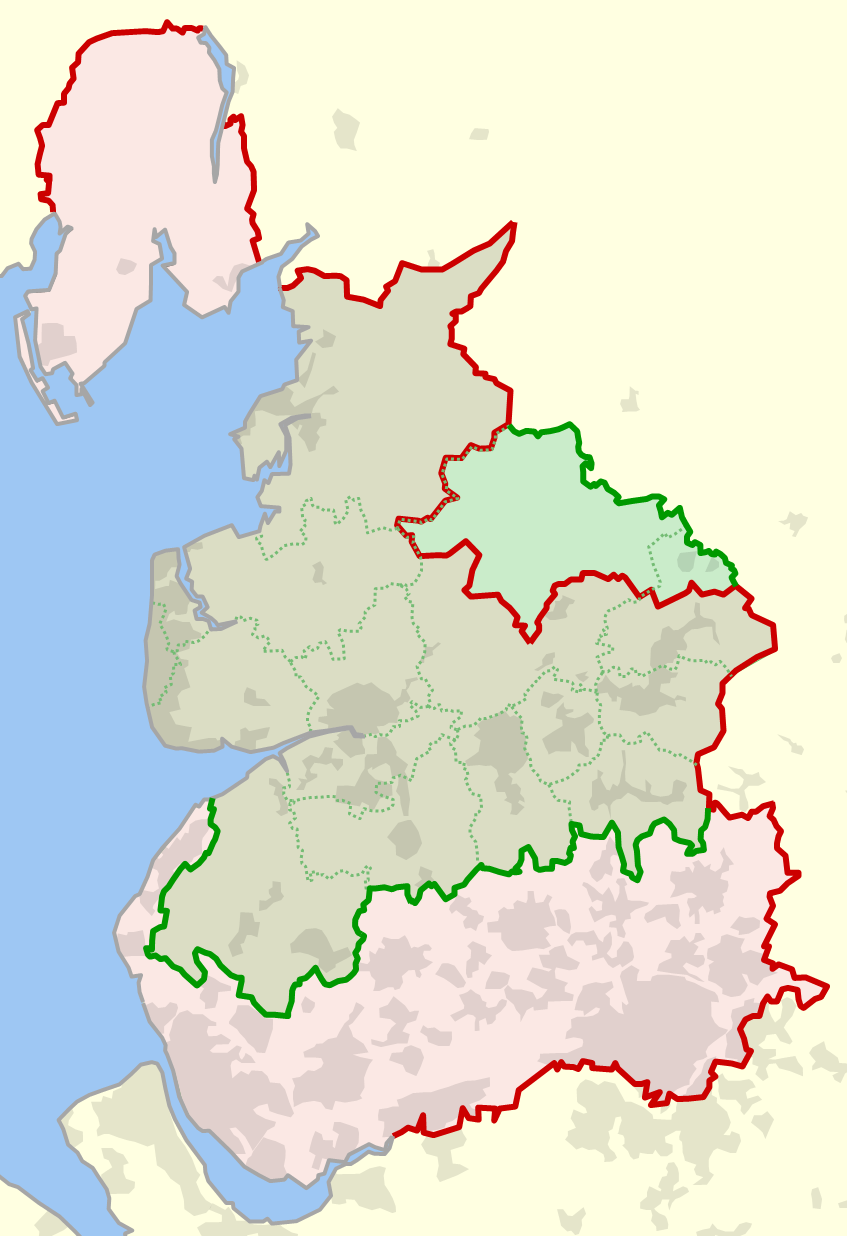
The historic boundaries of Lancashire (red) compared with the modern ones (green).

Furness formed the greater part of the North Lonsdale exclave of the historic county of Lancashire, which bordered Cumberland to the northwest and Westmorland to the northeast (the point where the three counties met is marked by the Three Shire Stone at the head of the Duddon). North Lonsdale is also called "Lancashire North of the Sands".

In 1974, North Lonsdale – along with Cumberland, Westmorland, and part of the West Riding of Yorkshire (around Sedbergh) – became part of the new administrative county of Cumbria. At the district level, it consisted of the borough of Barrow and part of South Lakeland.

In April 2023, Furness became part of the new unitary council area of Westmorland and Furness, which replaced Cumbria County Council and the districts of Barrow and South Lakeland, all of which were abolished.

Low Furness and the western part of High Furness are in the Barrow and Furness parliamentary constituency, while eastern High Furness is in Westmorland and Lonsdale.

== Notable people ==
- Jess Gillam (1998-), musician
- Henry Robinson Hall (1859–1927), artist
- Emlyn Hughes (1947-2004), footballer
- Myles Burton Kennedy (1862–1928), ironmaster
- Stan Laurel (1890-1965), actor
- Christine McVie (1943-2022), musician
- Dave Myers (1957-2024), cook and television presenter
- Ben Palmer (1976-), film and television director
- George Romney (1734-1802), artist
- Miles Romney (1806-1877), architect and early settler of the American west
- Georgia Stanway (1999-), footballer

== Gallery ==
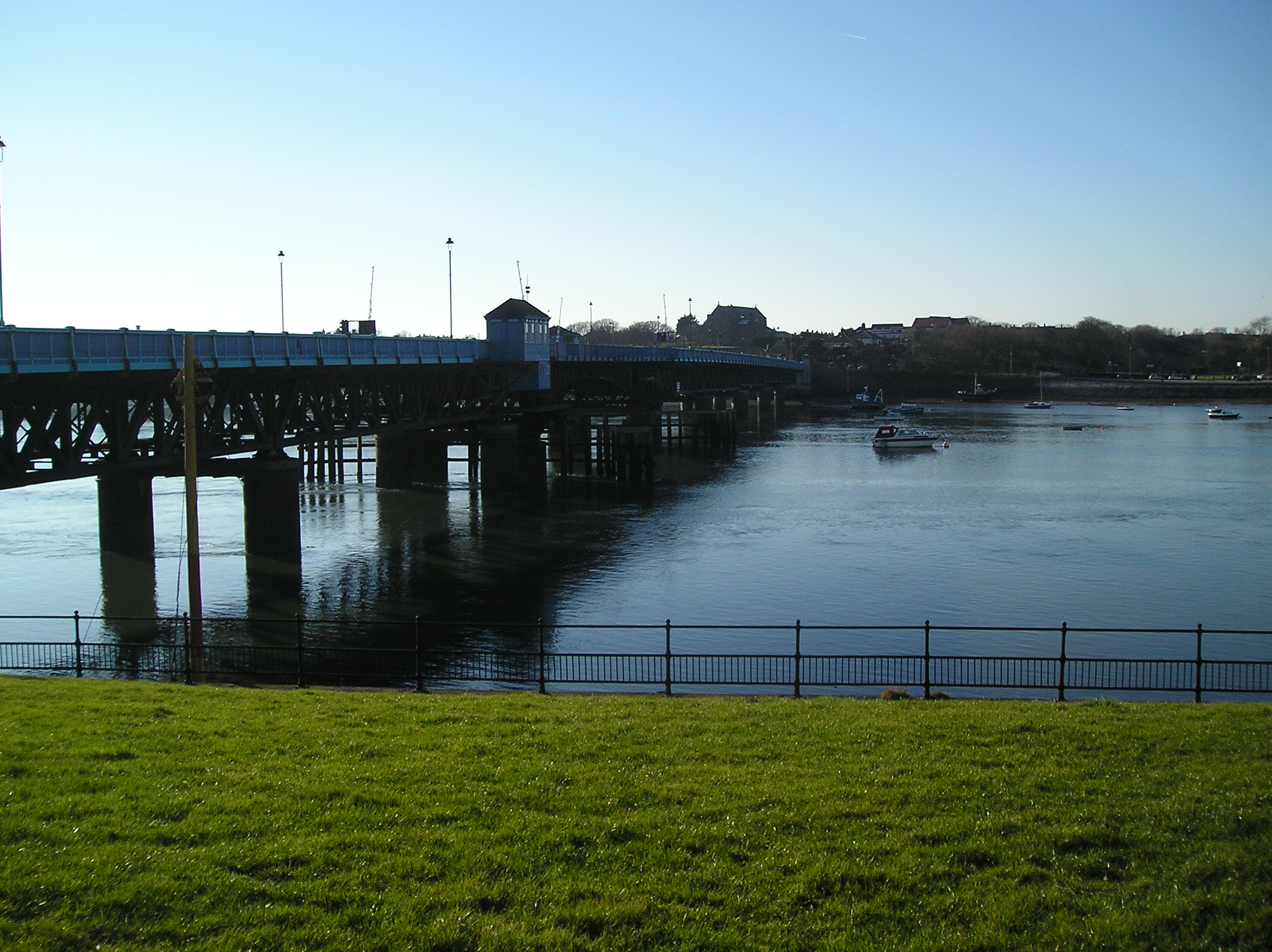
Jubilee Bridge, linking Barrow Island and Walney Island

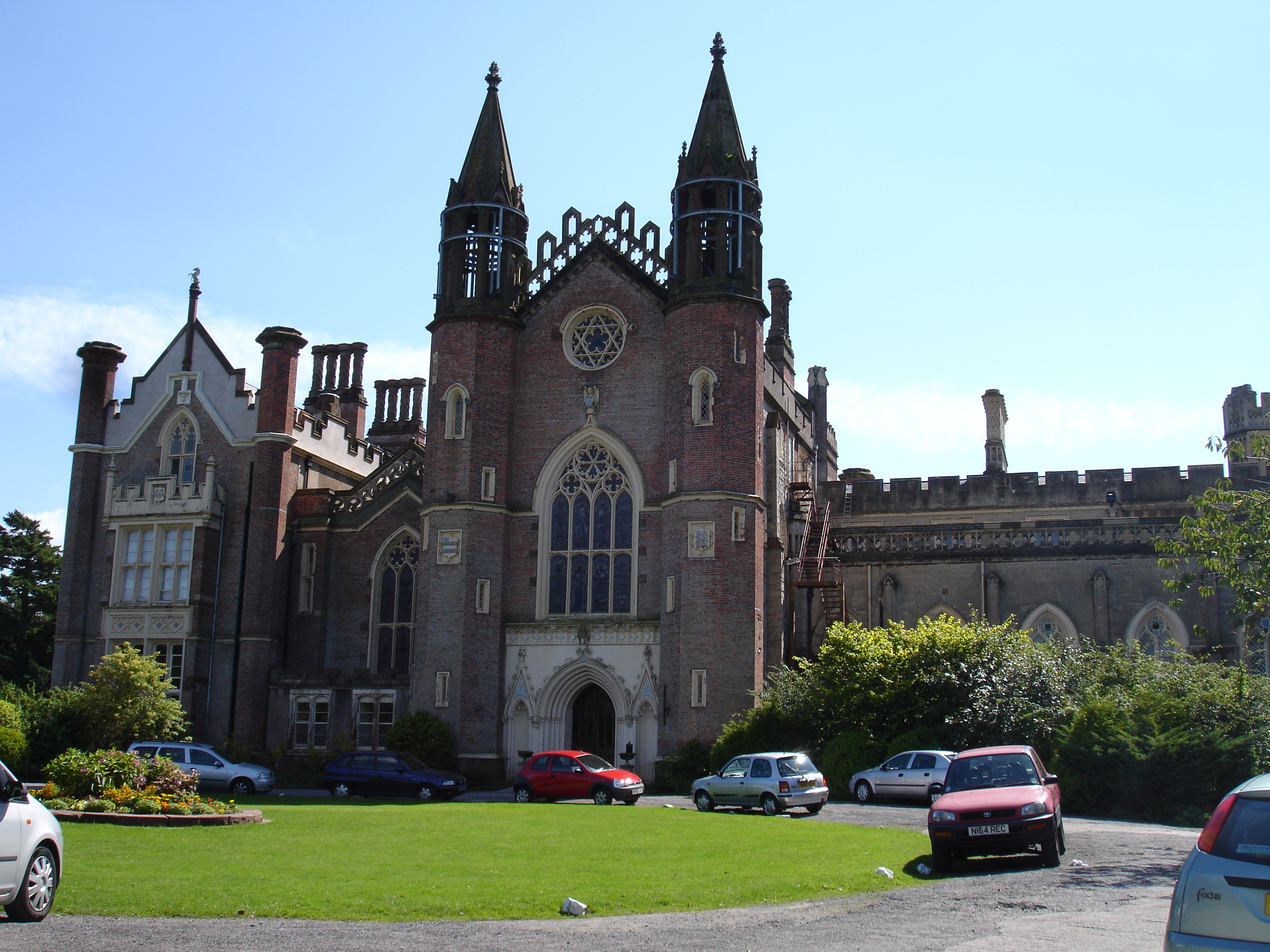
Conishead Priory, near Ulverston

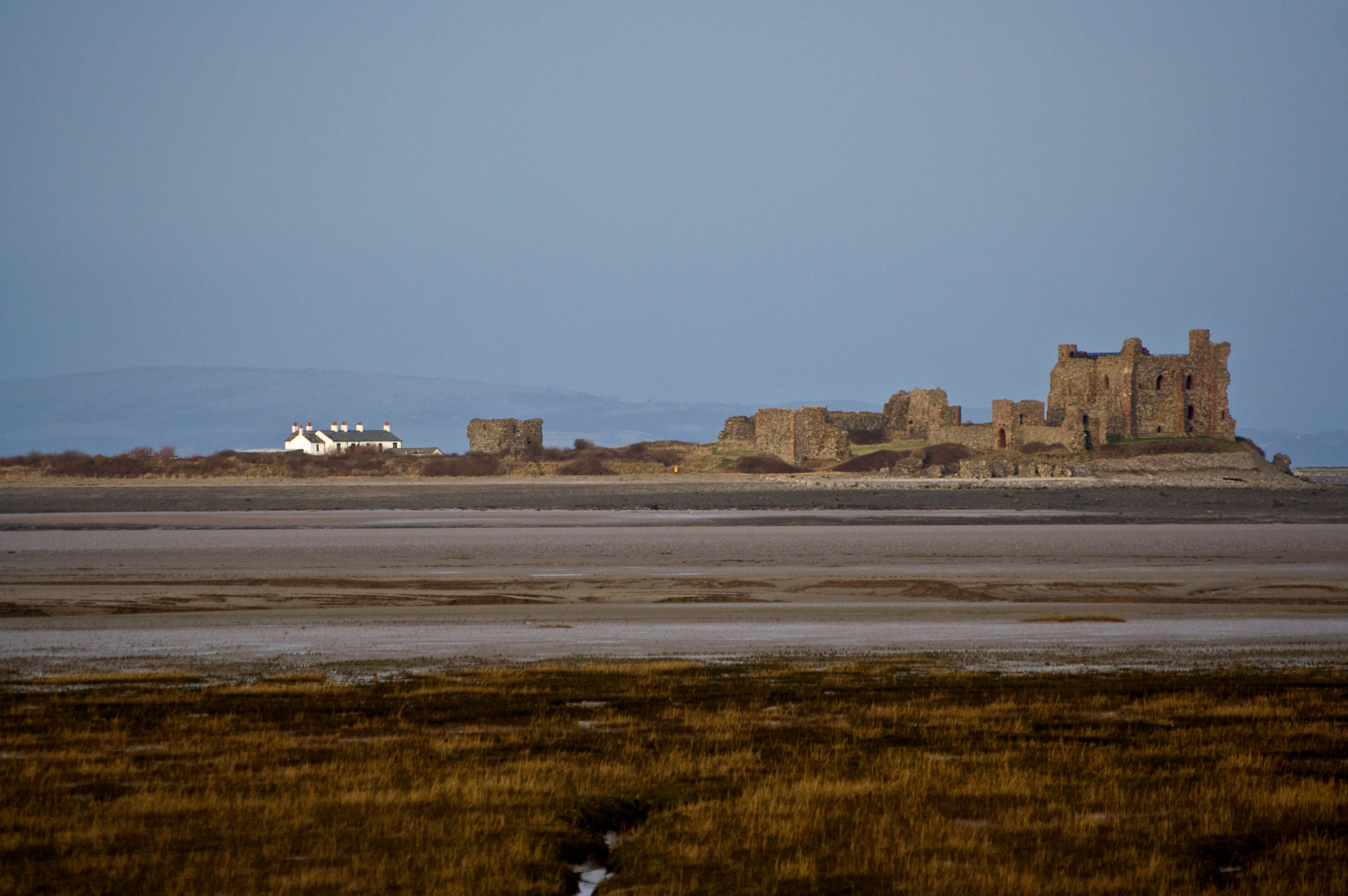
Piel island and castle

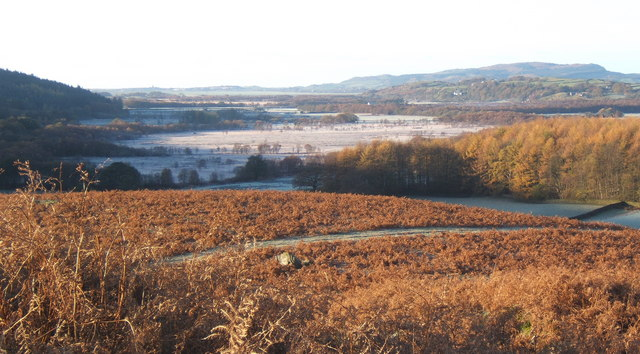
Scenery near Broughton in the winter

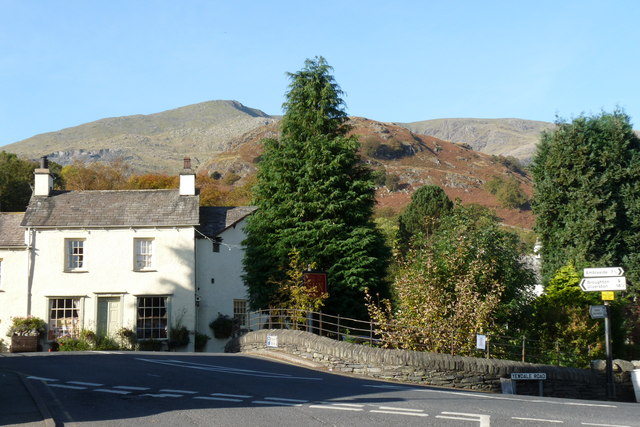
The Old Man of Coniston from Coniston village

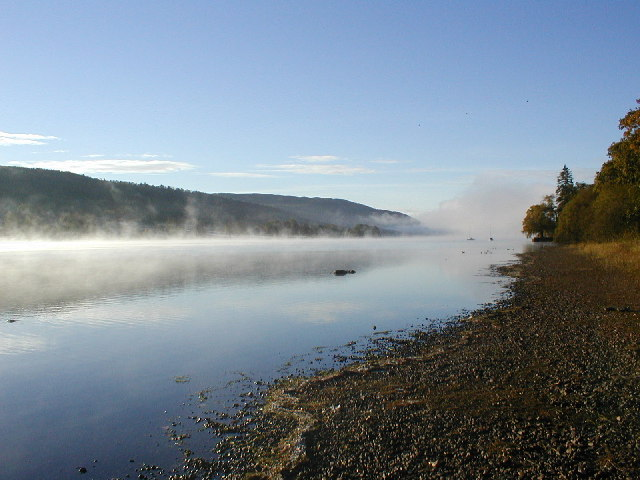
Coniston Water

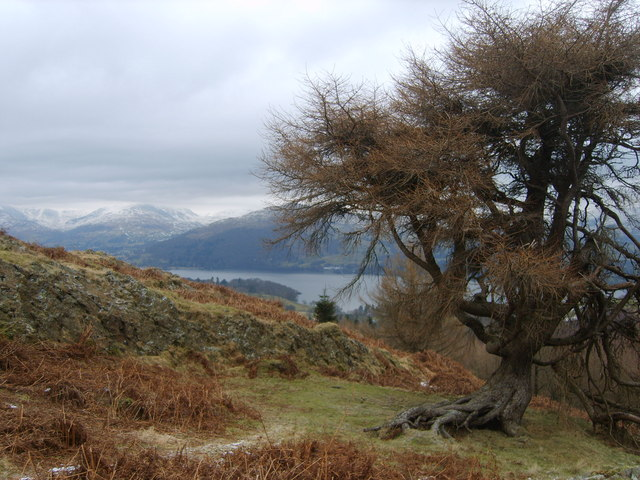
View of Windermere from Latterbarrow
