= Harrington (surname) =

Harrington (or Harington) is an English habitational name from places in Cumbria, Lincolnshire, and Northamptonshire. It is also a common surname in southwest Ireland, where it was adopted as an Anglicized form of the Gaelic surnames Ó hArrachtáin and Ó hIongardail. Notable people with the surname include:

== Harrington ==
- Adam Harrington (disambiguation)
- Al Harrington, American basketball player
- Al Harrington (1935–2021), Samoan-American actor
- Alan Harrington, Welsh footballer
- Anna Short Harrington, actress portraying Aunt Jemima
- Anthony David Harrington aka Anthony David, American R&B singer
- Baron Harrington of Aldingham
- Bernard Joseph Harrington, American clergyman
- Beth Harrington, American filmmaker and musician
- Betty Jean Harrington, American gymnast
- Brette Harrington, American professional rock climber and alpinist
- Brooke Harrington, American economic sociologist
- Celestine Tate Harrington, street musician
- Cheryl Francis Harrington, actress
- Chris Harrington may refer to:
  - Chris Harrington (American football), American football player
  - Chris Harrington (ice hockey), ice hockey player
- Conrad Harrington, Canadian businessman
- Curtis Harrington, American film director
- Dan Harrington may refer to:
  - Dan Harrington, poker player
  - Dan Harrington (politician)
- Daniel J. Harrington (1940–2014), American biblical scholar
- David C. Harrington, American politician
- The de Harringtons, English Barons of Muchland
- Dedrick Harrington, American football player
- Desmond Harrington, American actor
- Donald J. Harrington, president of St. John's University in New York
- Donald S. Harrington, American politician and religious leader
- Doug Harrington, racing driver
- Doug Harrington (musician), guitarist
- Earl of Harrington
- Ed Harrington, Canadian football player
- Edith Marguerite Harrington, grandmother of the Duchess of Cornwall
- Edward Harrington (disambiguation)
- Edward Harrington, aka Eddy Clearwater, American blues musician
- Emerson Harrington, American politician
- Emily Harrington, American professional rock climber and adventurer
- Eric Harrington, Canadian businessman
- Ethel Harrington, American sprinter
- Fred Harvey Harrington, American educator
- George Harrington may refer to:
  - George Christy, American minstrel performer born George Harrington
  - George P. Harrington, American politician from Wisconsin
- Gerry Harrington, Irish Gaelic athletics chairman
- Gordon Sidney Harrington, Canadian politician
- Hago Harrington, American ice-hockey player
- Harold Harrington, American botanist
- Henry F. Harrington, American newspaper editor
- Henry Moore Harrington, American military officer
- Henry W. Harrington, American politician
- Illtyd Harrington (1931–2015), British politician
- Jack Harrington (Australian footballer)
- Jack Harrington (English footballer)
- James Harrington may refer to:
  - James C. Harrington, American civil rights attorney
  - James Harrington (author) (1611–1677), usually spelled Harington, English political philosopher
  - Major-General Sir James Harrington, 3rd Baronet, officer in the New Model Army
- Jay Harrington, American actor
- Jessica Harrington, Irish racehorse trainer
- Jeremy Harrington, American YouTuber and voice actor
- J. J. Harrington, American politician from North Carolina
- Joe Harrington (baseball)
- Joey Harrington, American football player
- John Harrington may refer to:
  - John Peabody Harrington (1884–1961), American linguist and ethnologist
  - John Harrington (American football) (1921–1992), American football player
  - John Harrington (baseball) (born c. late 1930s), American business manager
  - John Harrington (ice hockey) (born 1957), American ice hockey player
- Joseph Harrington
  - Joseph B. Harrington (1908–1964), American politician from Massachusetts
- Josh Harrington, American BMX rider
- Kate Harrington, American actress
- Kate Harrington (poet)
- Kellie Harrington, Irish boxer
- Kevin Harrington (actor), Australian actor
- Laura Harrington, American actress
- Laurence Harrington, British actor
- Leo Harrington, American mathematician
- Levi Harrington (died 1882), American victim of lynching
- Lisa Harrington (born 1965), Canadian writer
- Lorinza Harrington, American basketball player
- Luca Harrington (born 2004), New Zealand freestyle skier
- Mae Harrington, American centenarian
- Margaret Harrington, Canadian politician
- Mark Harrington (disambiguation)
- Martin Harrington, British songwriter and record producer
- Maura Harrington, Irish activist
- Melissa Harrington (1970–2001), victim of the September 11 attacks
- Michael Harrington may refer to:
  - Michael Harrington, American socialist
  - Michael J. Harrington, American politician
  - Michael Harrington (soccer)
  - Michael Harrington (Canadian writer), Canadian writer and editor
  - Mike Harrington, computer game developer
- Nancey Harrington (born 1953), American politician from Kansas
- Nancy Harrington (1926–2020), American politician
- Neil (Harrington) O Leary, Lucan Sarsfield player of the year 2025
- Ollie Harrington, American cartoonist
- Othella Harrington, American basketball player
- Paddy Harrington (1933–2005), Irish sportsman, father of Pádraig
- Pádraig Harrington, Irish golfer
- Pat Harrington may refer to:
  - Pat Harrington, Sr., Canadian actor
  - Pat Harrington, Jr., his son, American actor
  - Pat Harrington (soccer), Canadian soccer player
- Peter Harrington, British government official and businessman
- Patrick Harrington (disambiguation):
  - Patrick Harrington (activist), British far right politician
  - Patrick Harrington (Roman Catholic Bishop), Kenyan bishop
- Paul Harrington (musician), Irish musician
- Paul Randall Harrington, American orthopaedic surgeon and designer of the Harrington Rod
- Perry Harrington, American football player
- Perry G. Harrington, American politician
- Phil Harrington, Welsh footballer
- Ray Harrington, American comedian
- Rex Harrington, Canadian ballet dancer
- Sir Richard Harington, 11th Baronet (1835–1911), British barrister and judge
- Sir Richard Harington, 12th Baronet (1861–1931) British barrister and judge.
- Richard Harrington (photographer) (1911–2005), German-Canadian photographer
- Richard Harrington (actor) (born 1975), Welsh actor
- Richard Harrington (politician) (born 1957), former UK MP, now Minister of State for Refugees
- Richard C. Harrington, British physician and psychologist
- Robert Harrington may refer to:
  - Robert George Harrington (1904–1987), astronomer, worked at Palomar Observatory
  - Robert Sutton Harrington (1942–1993), astronomer, worked at the US Naval Observatory
- Rod Harrington, English darts player
- Roger F. Harrington, American electrical engineer and academic
- Rowdy L. Harrington, American film director
- Samuel M. Harrington (1882–1948), American marine officer
- Samuel M. Harrington (politician), see List of justices of the Delaware Supreme Court
- Sara Leland (1941–2020), American ballet dancer and répétiteur born Sally Harrington
- Sarah Harrington, British artist
- Scott Harrington may refer to:
  - Scott Harrington (racing driver) (born 1963), American racing driver
  - Scott Harrington (ice hockey) (born 1993), Canadian ice hockey player
- S. W. Harrington, American physician, football player and coach
- Steven Harrington aka Steve Strange, Welsh pop singer
- Sybil B. Harrington (1908–1998), American philanthropist
- Theophilus Harrington, American jurist
- Thomas Harrington (disambiguation), including Tom
- Tim Harrington, founding member of hard rock group Masters of Reality
- Timothy Charles Harrington, Irish politician
- Ty Harrington, American college baseball coach
- Vincent F. Harrington, American politician
- Wilfrid Harrington, Irish priest
- William Harrington (disambiguation), including Bill

== See also ==
- Harington (surname)
