= Harington (surname) =

Harington is a surname, and may refer to:

- Bridget Harington (1579–1609), English courtier
- Charles Harington (chemist), Welsh chemist
- Charles Harington (British Army officer, born 1872), British general
- Charles Harington (British Army officer, born 1910), British general
- Charles Richard Harington (1933–2021), Canadian zoologist
- Dominic Harington (born 1984), English snowboarder
- Donald Harington (writer) (1935–2009), American novelist
- Edward Harington (politician) (c.1526–c.1600), English politician
- Edward Harington of Ridlington (died 1652), English landowner
- Edward Charles Harington (1804–1881), English churchman and writer
- Elizabeth Harington (died 1618), English aristocrat
- Ethelreda Harington, married name of Ethelreda Malte, alleged illegitimate daughter of Henry VIII of England
- Hastings Edward Harington (1868–1916), British Indian Army officer and ornithologist
- Henry Harington (1727–1816), English physician, musician and author
- Henry Harington (soldier) (d. 1613), English soldier
- Herbert Harington (1868–1948), English soldier and cricketer
- Herbert Hastings Harington, British army officier and ornithologist
- James Harington (1611–1677), English author
- James Harington (lawyer) (c.1511–1592), English landowner and public servant
- Sir James Harington, 1st Baronet of Ridlington, English landowner
- Sir James Harington, 3rd Baronet of Ridlington (1607–1680), English landowner
- John Harington, 1st Baron Harington (1281–1347)
- John Harington, 2nd Baron Harington (1328–1363)
- John Harington, 4th Baron Harington (1384–1418)
- John Harington (died 1553), English treasurer
- John Harington (died 1582), English courtier and politician
- John Harington, 1st Baron Harington of Exton (1539–1613), English politician
- John Harington, 2nd Baron Harington of Exton (1592–1614), English courtier
- John Harington (writer) (1560–1612), British writer, son of the treasurer
- John Herbert Harington (1765–1828), British orientalist, colonial administrator and judge
- Joy Harington (1914–1991), English television actress and writer
- Kit Harington (born 1986), English actor
- Lucy Harington, English Countess
- Mabel Harington (died 1603), English courtier
- Margaret Harington (died 1601), English courtier
- Odile Harington (born 1961), alleged South African agent
- Richard Harington (1800–1853), English cleric and Oxford college head
- Sir Richard Harington, 11th Baronet (1835–1911), British barrister and judge
- Sir Richard Harington, 12th Baronet (1861–1931), British barrister and judge
- Robert Harington, 3rd Baron Harington (1356–1406), English peer.
- Sarah Harington (1565–1629), English courtier
- Theodosia Harington (died 1649), English courtier

== See also ==
- Harrington (surname)
