= John Harrington =

John Harrington or Harington may refer to:

== Politicians ==
- John Harington, 1st Baron Harington (1281–1347)
- John Harington, 2nd Baron Harington (1328–1363)
- John Harington, 4th Baron Harington (1384–1418)
- John Harington (died 1553), MP for Rutland
- John Harington (died 1582), MP for Pembroke Boroughs, Old Sarum and Caernarvon Boroughs; official of Henry VIII of England
- John Harrington (died 1654) (1589–1654), English politician
- John Harington, 1st Baron Harington of Exton (1539–1613), English politician
- John Harington, 2nd Baron Harington of Exton (1592–1614), English courtier
- John Harrington (Parliamentarian) (1627–1700), English politician
- John Harrington (American politician) (born 1956), American politician and member of the Minnesota State Senate

== Others ==
- John Harrington of Hornby (died 1359), English knight
- John Harrington (knight) (died 1460), Yorkist knight during the Wars of the Roses
- John Harington (writer) (1560–1612), English writer, of Kelston, inventor of the flushing toilet
- John Harrington (Medal of Honor) (1848–1905), Medal of Honor recipient for the Indian Wars
- John L. Harrington (1868–1942), American bridge engineer
- John Peabody Harrington (1884–1961), American ethnologist
- John Harrington (American football) (1921–1992), American football player
- John Harrington (baseball) (born c. 1937), American business manager and baseball executive
- John Harrington (ice hockey) (born 1957), American ice hockey player
- John Herbert Harington (died 1828), British orientalist, colonial administrator and judge

== See also ==
- Jack Harrington (disambiguation)
- John Herrington (disambiguation)
- Harrington (surname)
