= James Harington =

James Harington or Harrington may refer to:

- Sir James Harrington (Yorkist knight), 15th century MP for Lancashire
- James Harrington (priest) (16th century), dean of York
- Sir James Harington (lawyer) (c. 1510–1592), English public servant
- James Harrington, lord mayor of York in 1560
- James Harrington (author) (1611–1677), sometimes spelled Harington, English political philosopher, known for Oceana
- James Harrington (1664–1693), lawyer and poet
- James Harrington (Georgia politician), American politician who ran in the 2000 US House of Representatives elections in Georgia
- James Harrington, former mayor of Brockton, Massachusetts
- James "Jim" C. Harrington, Texas civil rights lawyer

Five Harington baronets have had the name James including:

- Sir James Harington, 1st Baronet (1542–1614), MP for Rutland, high sheriff of Rutland and Oxfordshire
- Sir James Harington, 3rd Baronet (1607–1680), officer in the New Model Army and regicide

== See also ==
- Harrington (surname)
