= Michael Harrington (disambiguation) =

Michael Harrington (1928–1989) was an American writer and broadcaster as well as a political activist and theorist.

Mike or Michael Harrington may also refer to:

== Politicians ==
- Michael J. Harrington (born 1936), American legislator from Massachusetts
- Michael Harrington, American Democratic politician (2008 California State Assembly election#District 3)
- Michael Harrington (New Hampshire politician), American legislator from New Hampshire
- Mike Harrington, American politician from Delaware (List of state parties of the Republican Party (United States))

== Sports personalities ==
- Michael C. Harrington, American horse racing trainer (2012 Preakness Stakes#The full chart)
- Michael Harrington, American ice hockey linesman (2019 World Junior Ice Hockey Championships#Officials)
- Michael Harrington (soccer) (born 1986), American soccer player
- Mike Harrington (tennis), American tennis player

== Others ==
- Michael Harrington (Canadian writer) (1916–1999), Newfoundland writer and editor
- Mike Harrington, American computer game developer since 1985
- Michael Harrington (bishop) (1900–1973), Canadian clergyman and bishop

== See also ==
- Harrington (surname)
