= Richard Harrington =

Richard Harrington may refer to:

- Richard Harrington (photographer) (1911–2005), German-Canadian photographer
- Richard Harrington (actor) (born 1975), Welsh actor
- Richard Harrington, Baron Harrington of Watford (born 1957), MP for Watford from 2010 to 2019.
- Richard C. Harrington (1956–2004), British physician and psychologist
