= Edward Harington =

Edward Harington may refer to:

- Edward Harington (politician) (c. 1526–c. 1600), English politician
- Edward Harington of Ridlington (died 1652), English landowner
- Edward Charles Harington (1804–1881), English churchman and writer

== See also ==
- Edward Harrington (disambiguation)
