= George Harrington =

George Harrington may refer to:

- George Christy (1827–1868), American minstrel performer born George Harrington
- George P. Harrington (1850–?), American politician from Wisconsin
- George F. Harrington, Speaker of the Alabama House of Representatives in 1868
