= Mark Harrington =

Mark Harrington may refer to:

- Mark Harrington (HIV/AIDS activist) (born 1959 or 1960), American AIDS activist
- Mark Harrington (anti-abortion activist), American anti-abortion activist
- Mark Raymond Harrington (1882–1971), American archeologist
- Mark Harrington (painter) (born 1952), American-born Europe-based painter
- Mark Walrod Harrington (1848–1926), American meteorologist
