= Pat Harrington =

Pat Harrington may refer to:

- Pat Harrington Sr. (1901–1965), Canadian actor
- Pat Harrington Jr. (1929–2016), his son, American actor
- Pat Harrington (soccer) (born 1965), Canadian soccer player
- Pat Harrington (Australian footballer) (1928–2011), Australian rules footballer

== See also ==
- Patrick Harrington (disambiguation)
