= Harington baronets =

Title in the Baronetage of England

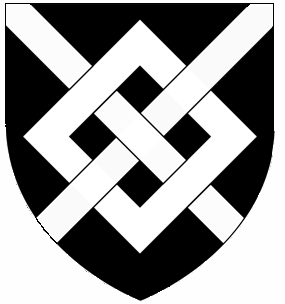
Coat of arms of Harington: Sable, a fret argent

The Harington Baronetcy, of Ridlington in the county of Rutland, is a title in the Baronetage of England. It was created on 29 June 1611 for James Harington. He was a descendant of John Harington, one of the Barons summoned to Parliament by Edward II. James's elder brother was John Harington, 1st Baron Harington of Exton. The second Baronet was a Royalist during the English Civil War. The third Baronet was a Major-General in the Parliamentarian Army and one of the judges appointed to try Charles I, although he refused to sit. He was nonetheless excepted from the Indemnity and Oblivion Act and his title was forfeited for life in 1661. The ninth, eleventh, and twelfth Baronets were all judges. The family is one of two families to have produced three County Court judges.

The Rev. Richard Harington, son of the eighth baronet, was Principal of Brasenose College, Oxford. Sir Charles Robert Harington (1897–1972), son of Reverend Charles Harington, second son of the eleventh Baronet, was Professor of Chemical Pathology at the University of London and Director of the National Institute for Medical Research. John Harington (1873–1943), fifth son of the eleventh Baronet, was a Brigadier-General in the British Army. David Gawen Champernowne (1912–2000), great-grandson of Arthur Champernowne (who assumed the surname of Champernowne in 1774), son of Reverend Richard Harington, second son of the sixth Baronet, was Professor of Statistics at the University of Oxford from 1948 to 1959 and Professor of Economics and Statistics at the University of Cambridge from 1970 to 1978. The second son of the current baronet is the actor Christopher "Kit" Harington, b. 1986.

== Harington baronets, of Ridlington (1611) ==
- Sir James Harrington, 1st Baronet (1542–1614)
- Sir Edward Harrington, 2nd Baronet (died 1653)
- Sir James Harington, 3rd Baronet (1607–1680) (baronetcy forfeited for life 1661)
- Sir Edmund Harington, 4th Baronet (c. 1635 – 1708)
- Sir Edward Harington, 5th Baronet (1639–1716), brother of the 4th Baronet
- Sir James Harington, 6th Baronet (died 1782), grandnephew of the 5th Baronet
- Sir James Harington, 7th Baronet (1726–1793)
- Sir John Edward Harington, 8th Baronet (1760–1831)
- Sir James Harington, 9th Baronet (1788–1835)
- Sir John Edward Harington, 10th Baronet (1821–1877)
- Sir Richard Harington, 11th Baronet (1835–1911), first cousin of the 10th Baronet
- Sir Richard Harington, 12th Baronet (1861–1931)
- Sir Richard Dundas Harington, 13th Baronet (1900–1981)
- Sir Nicholas John Harington, 14th Baronet (1942–2016), nephew of the 13th Baronet
- Sir David Richard Harington, 15th Baronet (born 1944)

The heir apparent to the baronetcy is the present holder's elder son John "Jack" Catesby Harington (born 1984). Sir David Harington is also the father of the actor Kit Harington.

== Footnotes ==
Baronetage of England
Preceded by Pope baronets	Harington baronets 29 June 1611	Succeeded by Savile baronets
