= Patrick Harrington (barrister) =

Welsh criminal barrister and Queen's Counsel

Patrick Harrington QC

Personal details
- Born: 1950 (age 75–76) Ebbw Vale, Wales
- Education: Ebbw Vale Grammar School
- Alma mater: Birmingham College of Commerce (LLB); University of Wales (MA)
- Occupation: Barrister

Patrick John Harrington KC (born 1950) is a Welsh criminal law barrister and King's Counsel. He has acted in more than 250 homicide trials, and has been noted for work on some of "the largest and most complex fraud cases in the UK". He has been referred to as one of Wales' "most prominent" lawyers.

== Early life ==
Harrington was born in Ebbw Vale, attending Ebbw Vale Grammar School.

Upon leaving school, Harrington went to read law at the Birmingham College of Commerce (now Birmingham City University), obtaining a Bachelor of Laws degree.

== Career ==
Following his education, he was called to the Bar (Gray's Inn) in 1973, and Harrington practiced from chambers in Cardiff for twenty years.

He was appointed as an Assistant Recorder in 1985 and made a Recorder in 1990. In 1993 he took silk, moving to chambers in London. After a "successful" first year in silk, he was invited to join the Chambers of Lord Williams of Mostyn QC at Farrar's Building.

Harrington was head of the Wales and Chester Circuit from 2003 until 2005.

He was Head of Chambers at Farrar's Building in London, which is known in the legal world as "the Welsh castle in the Temple".

Harrington was involved in a "serious" car crash in 2020, and was hospitalised for an extended period of time.

== Specialisms ==
He has appeared in over 250 homicide cases, is ranked in the top tier of both Chambers and Partners, and is a Legal 500 Leading Individual, for his crime and financial crime practice.

Harrington is a Recorder of the Crown Court, former leader of the Wales & Chester circuit, the former Vice President of the National Anti-Doping Panel, and a member of the following associations:

- Criminal Bar Association
- Sports Law Association
- London Commercial & Common Law Bar Association
- Wales & Chester Circuit Criminal Law Association

== Personal life ==
Harrington was born in Ebbw Vale and now lives in Raglan, Monmouthshire. He is a member of the Monmouthshire Incorporated Law Society.

He is a keen sportsman, serving as a member of the Ebbw Vale RFC and Glamorgan County Cricket Club. He also plays tennis, and skis, and his hobbies include playing music and classic motors.

Harrington is a keen follower of horse racing, previously owning a horse and competing in races with riders Richard Johnson, Jim Culloty, and Guy Lewis.

In 2013 he became the president of Ebbw Vale Male Voice Choir.

He is the author of a book about session drummer Bobby Graham, entitled The Session Man. Graham performed as part of The Kinks, as well as alongside Tom Jones and Dusty Springfield.

In January 2020, Harrington was left seriously ill after crashing his BMW between junctions 24 (Coldra) and 25 (Caerleon) of the M4 motorway near Newport on 3 January. He was airlifted to the University Hospital of Wales, Cardiff. No other vehicles were involved, however Gwent Police are appealing for witnesses.

Following the incident, Ebbw Vale Rugby Club President Mark Powell QC issued a statement of condolence. He praised Harrington for his "considerable role alongside the Russell family during the glory years of professional rugby".

Farrar's Building Chambers released a statement on behalf of Susan Harrington in March 2020 reporting that Patrick was mobile and was able to speak, which the Chambers described as "positive progress".

== Noted cases ==
- R v Hughes [1996] - secured the conviction of Hughes at Chester Crown Court for the 1995 murder of seven-year-old Sophie Hook. Hughes was given three life sentences, which was re-evaluated by Home Secretary David Blunkett in November 2002 and set at a minimum of 50 years.
- R v Morris [2002] - prosecuted and achieved the conviction of Morris for the murders of 38-year-old Mandy Power, eighty-year-old Doris Dawson, ten-year-old Katie Power, and eight-year-old Emily Power. Known as the Clydach Killer, Morris was served by the judge with four life sentences. His case was quashed on appeal, but in 2006 Harrington was again instructed, and Morris was found guilty for a second time. Morris was one of only a few in the UK to be given a whole-life sentence, however, this was reduced to 32 years in prison in July 2007.
- R v Hampson [2002] - prosecuted Hampson for the murder of 26-year-old Geraldine Palk, whose body was found in a stream in Fairwater, Cardiff in December 1990.
- R v Ramshaw [2007] - Harrington successfully defended eighteen-year-old Ramshaw (also from Ebbw Vale) against the charge of causing death by dangerous driving (Section 1 of the Road Traffic Act 1988). Ramshaw had killed two sixteen-year-old girls, two fifteen-year-old girls, and injured one male, all of whom who were passengers in his car when it flipped at an approximate speed of 50 miles (80 km) to 70 miles (110 km) per hour.
- R v Griffiths [2010] - defended care home psychiatric nurse Griffiths against the charge of wilfully ill-treating or neglecting a person who lacked mental capacity, under Section 20 of the Criminal Justice and Courts Act 2015. Griffiths had ill-treated two elderly patients: pushing and shoving an 85-year-old man with senile dementia, and pulling an 81-year-old woman with senile dementia by her ankles. Griffiths was sentenced to 50 hours' unpaid work for each offence after the judge found Griffiths meant no harm.
- R v Richards and Hope [2012] - acting in the trial and retrial over a contract killing where the wrong target was murdered. Seventeen-year-old Siddiqi was killed, and his parents Parveen and Sheikh Iqbal were attacked, when 38-year-old Richards and 39-year-old Hope entered their home thinking they were being paid £1,000 to kill a man, who resided on a different street. Both were high on heroin at the time of the offence and were sentenced to minimum terms of 40 years in prison, which was increased from the guidelines by the judge due to the severity of the crimes. Siddiqi had been killed while he had been waiting for the "arrival of his Koran teacher".
- R v Evans (Eric) and others [2014] 1 WLR 2817 - achieved a successful defence dismissal application following a prosecution by the Serious Fraud Office of three solicitors. The verdict was described as "yet another humiliating episode for the SFO". Under the Prosecution of Offences Act 1985 (section 19), the SFO was forced to pay total costs claimed of over £7 million.
- R v Peter Morgan [2016] - acted for 54-year-old property developer Peter Morgan on the charge of murder. Morgan, whose net worth was valued at £20m, killed 25-year-old escort Symonds after years of "providing a lavish lifestyle". Harrington asserted that Morgan "suffered from an abnormality of mental functioning", however, both partial defences were rejected by the jury. Morgan was found to have a mild form of Asperger’s syndrome, which "lowered (Morgan's) degree of culpability to a modest extent", but Garnham J asserted that any mitigating factors were balanced evenly against the aggravating factors, and as a result chose to sentence Morgan to a life sentence of 25 years. Morgan sought to appeal his sentence in 2017 but this was rejected by Lady Justice Hallett, who said the sentence was "not manifestly excessive."
- Operation Bulkhead (2016) - prosecuted a £100 million film fraud case, involving four defendants and over 50,000 pages of served evidence. The judge at the trial described the case as "one of the most difficult and complicated cases presented at the Bar." Harrington secured a combined sentence for conspiracy to cheat the public revenue, with the four serving a minimum of 29 years.
- R v Tom Carney [2021] - prosecuting 29 year old former rugby player Tom Carney for the murder of 76 year old David Philips in Neath on Valentine's Day 2019. Carney reportedly visited Phillips under the pretence of exchanging sex for alcohol, and proceeded with a "vicious" and "brutal" attack that killed the pensioner.

== Publications ==
Books
Title	Publisher	Year
The Session Man	Broom House Publishing Limited	2004
