= H. Hyde =

H. Hyde was a British Army officer and indologist.

Hyde was an officer in the Royal Engineers in Bengal, India. He was appointed to the rank of lieutenant colonel in 1846. He was president of The Asiatic Society of Bengal for 1873/74 and became a trustee of the associated Indian Museum in 1873.

== See also ==
- List of presidents of The Asiatic Society
