= Robert Harrington =

Robert Harrington may refer to:

== Politicians ==
- Robert Harrington (MP for St Ives), MP for St Ives 1559
- Robert Harrington (died 1399), MP for Leicestershire 1393 and Rutland 1384
- Robert Harrington (MP for Lancashire), MP for Lancashire
- Rob Harrington (born 1962/1963), American politician

== Others ==
- Robert Harrington (writer), English writer
- Robert George Harrington (1904–1987), astronomer, worked at Palomar Observatory
- Robert Sutton Harrington (1942–1993), astronomer, worked at the US Naval Observatory
- Robert Harrington (philanthropist) (1589–1654), bequests are part of the Bourne United Charities
- Bob Harrington (1912–?), jazz musician
- Robert A. Harrington, American physician and professor
- Robert Harrington (visual effects artist), British visual effects artist
