= List of presidents of The Asiatic Society =

This is a list of presidents of The Asiatic Society of Bengal (Calcutta).

== 18th century ==
- Sir William Jones (1784–1794)
- Sir John Shore (1794–1799)
- Robert Chambers (1799)
- Sir John Anstruther, 4th Baronet (1799–1807)

== 19th century ==
- Henry Thomas Colebrooke (1807–?1815)
- Francis Rawdon-Hastings, 1st Marquess of Hastings (1820–1825)
- John Herbert Harington (1825–1828)
- Charles Edward Grey (1828–1832)
- Sir Edward Ryan (1832–1841)
- Henry Thoby Prinsep (1842–1844)
- William Wilberforce Bird (1844–1845)
- Henry Hardinge, 1st Viscount Hardinge (1845)
- William Wilberforce Bird (1846–1848)
- James William Colvile (1848–1859)
- Arthur Grote (1859–62)
- Lt. Col. H. E. L. Thuillier (1863)
- William Stephen Atkinson (1863)
- Sir Edward Clive Bayley (1863–1867)
- Dr. Joseph Fayrer (1867–68)
- Dr. Thomas Oldham (1868–1870)
- Hon John Budd Phear (1870–1872)
- Dr. Thomas Oldham (1873)
- Lt. Col. H. Hyde (1873–1874)
- Sir Edward Clive Bayley (1875)
- Dr. Thomas Oldham (1875–1877)
- Sir Edward Clive Bayley (1877–1878)
- William Thomas Blanford (1878–1879)
- Henry Benedict Medlicott (1879–1881)
- Sir Ashley Eden (1881–1882)
- Herbert John Reynolds (1882–1884)
- Henry Francis Blanford (1884–1885)
- Dr. Rajendralal Mitra (1885)
- Edwin Felix Thomas Atkinson (1886–1887)
- James Waterhouse (1888–1890)
- Henry Beveridge (1890–1891)
- Sir Alfred Woodley Croft (1891–1892)
- Sir Charles Alfred Elliott (1893–1894)
- Charles James Lyall (1894–1895)
- Alexander Pedler (1895–1896)
- Dr. Augustus Frederic Rudolf Hoernle (1897–1898)
- Sir Herbert Hope Risley (1898–1900)

== 20th century ==
- Sir John Woodburn (1900–1901)
- Charles Walter Bolton (1902–1905) (Chief Secretary to the Bengal Government)
- Sir A. H. L. Fraser (1905–1907)
- Sir Ashutosh Mukherjee (3 times) (1907–1908)
- Sir Thomas Henry Holland (1909–1910)
- Thomas Henry Digges La Touche (1910–1911) (Geologist, born 1855)
- George Francis Angelo Harris (1911–1912)
- Thomas David, Baron Carmichael (1913–1915)
- Sir Leonard Rogers (1915–1916)
- Henry Hubert Hayden (1917–1918)
- Haraprasad Shastri (1919–1920)
- Sir Ashutosh Mukherjee (1921–1923)
- Nelson Annandale (1923–1924)
- Sir Rajendranath Mookherjee (1924–1925)
- George H. Tipper (1926–1927) (Superintendent of the Geological Survey in India)
- Dr. W. A. K. Christie (1927–1928) (Indian Geological Survey)
- Dr. Upendranath Brahmachari (1928–1929)
- Robert Beresford Seymour Sewell (1930–1931)
- Justice C. C. Ghose (1932–1934)
- Lewis Leigh Fermor (1934–1935)
- Sir John Anderson (1936–1938)
- Sir David Ezra (1938–1939)
- Justice John Lort-Williams (1940–1941)
- Dr C. S. Fox (1941–1942) (Director of the Geological Survey of India)
- Dr Shyama Prasad Mookerjee (1942–1944)
- Dr Meghnad Saha (1945–1946)
- Justice Norman George Armstrong Edgley (1946–1947)
- Dr Bimala Churn Law (1947–1948)
- Dr D. West (1948)
- Justice Ramaprasad Mookherjee (1948–1950)
- Prof Sisir Kumar Mitra (1951–1953)
- Prof S. K. Chatterji (1953–1955)
- Dr D. M. Bose (1955–1957)
- Dr S. N. Sen (1957–1959)
- Dr Nalinaksha Dutt (1959–1961)
- Dr A. C. Ukil (1961–1962)
- Dr U. N. Ghoshal (1963–1964)
- Dr K. N. Bagchi (1964–1965)
- Prof R. C. Majumdar (1966–1968)
- Prof Satyendra Nath Bose (1968–1969)
- Prof S. K. Chatterji (1970–1971)
- Prof Nirmal Kumar Bose (1972)
- M. M. Basu (1972)
- Dr B. Mukherji (1972–1974)
- Prof. K. Saraswati (1975–1977)
- Dr Gouri Nath Sastri (1977–1978)
- Dr D. Bose (1979–1981)
- P. C. Gupta (1981–1982)
- S. N. Sen (1983)
- Dr R. K. Pal (1983–1985)
- Dr Sukumar Sen (1985–1987)
- Dr M. M. Chakraborty (1987–1988)
- In administration (1988–1992)
- Dr M M Chakraborty (1992–1996)
- Prof Dilip Kumar Biswas (1997–1999)
- Prof Bhaskar Roychowdhury (1999–2001)

== 21st century ==
- Prof Biswanath Banerji (2001–2002)
- Prof Amalendu De (2002–2003)
- Prof Biswanath Banerji (2004–2012)
- Prof Pallab Sengupta (2012–2014)
- Prof Ramakanta Chakraborty (2014–2016)
- Prof Isha Mahammad (2016–2020)
- Prof Swapan Pramanick (2020–2024)

== References and sources ==
Sources

- Official website of The Asiatic Society, Presidents and Secretaries of The Asiatic Society
