= Joseph Harrington =

Joseph Harrington may refer to:

- Joey Harrington (born 1978), American football player
- J. J. Harrington (Joseph Julian Harrington, 1919–2008), North Carolina politician
- Joe Harrington (basketball) (born 1945), basketball coach
- Joe Harrington (baseball) (1869–1933), baseball player
- Joe Harrington (broadcaster), Irish radio presenter
- Joseph B. Harrington (1908–1964), American jurist and politician
- Joseph Ryan Harrington (born 1999), American actor and dancer
