= John Herrington (disambiguation) =

John Herrington is an astronaut.

John Herrington may also refer to:

- John Herrington (actor) (1912–1996), actor; see The Treasure of Abbot Thomas
- John S. Herrington (born 1939), American politician
- John Herrington House and Herrington Bethel Church

== See also ==
- John Harrington (disambiguation)
