= Patrick Harrington =

Patrick Harrington may refer to:

- Patrick Harrington (bishop) (1939), Kenyan Bishop-emeritus of the Diocese of Lodwar in Kenya
- Patrick Harrington (barrister) (1950), Welsh barrister and Queen's Counsel
- Patrick Harrington (activist) (1964), English nationalist political activist
- Patrick L. Harrington, member of the Michigan House of Representatives.

== See also ==
- Pat Harrington (disambiguation)
