= Texas Civil Rights Project =

US non-profit organization

- Formation: 1990
- Founder: James C. Harrington
- Type: Nonprofit organization
- Tax ID no.: 30003483341
- Purpose: Advocates for Texas communities
- Headquarters: Austin, Texas
- Location: United States
- Region served: Texas
- Website: www.txcivilrights.org

Texas Civil Rights Project (TCRP) is a 501(c)(3) nonprofit organization based in Austin, Texas, that advocates for voting rights, racial justice, economic justice, and criminal justice reform. It was formed in 1990 by attorney James C. Harrington.

== History ==
The South Texas Project (STP) was founded in 1972 by the ACLU. In 1978, attorney James C. Harrington created Oficina Legal del Pueblo Unido, Inc. (OLPU) as a grassroots foundation in South Texas. STP came under the auspices of OLPU soon after OLPU was founded. OLPU was a part of the late-1960s farm worker movement headed by César Chávez. Chávez's efforts to organize the South Texas farm worker community and ultimately secure union contracts for them led to the birth of both OLPU and the United Farm Workers. OLPU is one of the oldest and foremost proponents of civil rights in the Rio Grande Valley and has long worked on behalf of farm workers, abused immigrant women, disabled people, and economically disadvantaged people along the US/Mexico border.

Inspired by the United Farm Workers' movement in the Rio Grande Valley, James Harrington founded the Texas Civil Rights Project (TCRP) as a program of OLPU in Austin, Texas, on September 23, 1990. Harrington went on to direct TCRP for 25 years; he expanded the organization into the legal advocacy organization it is today.

In February 2016, Mimi Marziani, a nationally recognized expert in voting rights and democratic reform, was announced as the group's second Executive Director. Under Marziani's leadership, TCRP has become internationally recognized in issues of racial and economic justice, voting rights, and criminal justice reform.

== Office locations and service areas ==
Today, TCRP's main office is located at the Michael Tigar Human Rights Center in Austin, Texas. Other regional offices are Houston, San Antonio, and South Texas, which remained in its initial location in San Juan until the grand opening of its new facility in Alamo, Texas, on June 22, 2011. Most recently, TCRP opened an office in San Antonio in 2018. While TCRP operates out of these regional offices, its services are available to individuals across the state.

== Issues ==
TCRP has traditionally worked on issues related to voting rights, institutional discrimination, criminal justice, and First Amendment rights. Today, TCRP's focus is honed on voting rights, racial and economic justice, and criminal justice reform, which are divided across three programmatic teams.

In 2016, TCRP's advocacy was geared toward improving Texas' voter registration system.

== Special programs ==
=== Criminal Injustice ===
Texas has one of the highest prison populations in the United States with a population of approximately 150,000 people. TCRP created the Criminal Injustice Reform program to fight against the injustices in Texas's criminal legal system and put an end to mass incarcerations and mass entanglements within the criminal system.

The Criminal Injustice Reform Program has seven values and approaches:

- Abolition: TCRP rejects the mass incarceration of Black and Brown people in Texas. TCRP aims to promote a public safety agenda centered around freedom, including decriminalization, decarceration, and divestment, to reduce the harms happening in the criminal system.
- Human Rights: TCRP believes that all humans are inherently free and that no one's fundamental rights to life, liberty, religion, worship, and peace should be at risk.
- Self-Determination: TCRP believes that self-determination, including the right to create alternatives to policing and prisons, is important to reduce the harm done in the criminal system to marginalized communities such as Black, Brown, and Indigenous people, women, the LGBTQ+ community, and those living in poor and low-income communities.
- Democracy, Civic & Political Participation: TCRP opposes prison gerrymandering and believes that democratic, civic & political participation for and by all people is crucial to building justice into the criminal justice system.
- Anti-Capitalism: TCRP believes that humans are not commodities and believes that focusing on public safety instead of revenue is critical to a fair and just criminal legal system.
- Anti-Racism: TCRP believes that understanding how White supremacy affects our customs, policies, operations, institutions and everyday life can be essential to reducing the harm done to marginalized communities in the criminal legal system.
- Criticality: TCRP draws from intersectionality and critical race, feminist and queer theory to further understand the harms the criminal system holds on people based on their race, gender, class, sexual orientation, religion, etc., and to promote justice for all.

=== Beyond Borders ===
Formerly known as the Racial and Economic Justice Program, TCRP has rebranded its program into the Beyond Borders program. Beyond Borders strives to work with migrant workers, immigrant families, and lawyers within the communities to create a "better Texas where all people are treated with dignity and respect."

- In June 2020, "The Texas Civil Rights Project sent a letter to Homeland Security, the Pentagon and the Justice Department demanding they halt wall work in March."
- In July 2020, over 500 children were held in a Hampton Inn in McAllen, Texas, in dark rooms with no access to the outside world. TCRP received calls from parents regarding their missing children so, members and advocates from TCRP gathered outside the Hampton Inn honking their car horns in the parking lot and holding a banner outside the hotel with a phone number. Migrants inside the hotel were found holding signs in the window that said "We don't have a phone" and "We need your help." The children were detained from the hotel and transferred to the Office of Refugee Resettlement shelters after the ACLU and TCRP filed a lawsuit against the federal government. "Karla Vargus, a Texas Civil Rights Project lawyer, represented a 13-year-old girl who was detained in a hotel and later expelled to El Salvador."
- In November 2020, the Civil Rights Project fought against the "Remain in Mexico" program, a program created by then-president Donald Trump, by suing the Trump administration, "claiming that DHS had sent back asylum-seekers with disabilities."

=== Voting Rights ===
TCRP's Voting Rights program focuses on redistricting, voter suppression, and voter registration in Texas.

In April 2022, TCRP sent a complaint to Galveston County about redistricting after the Commissioners Court proposed a new map that eliminates Precinct 3, "the only precinct where Black and Latino residents of Galveston County could elect the candidate of their choice."

== Major litigation ==
=== Disability rights ===
TCRP's efforts to promote ballot accessibility for blind voters have set the national model for ballot accessibility and their annual regional Americans with Disabilities Act of 1990 (ADA) compliance campaigns throughout Texas to commemorate every anniversary of the ADA have prompted a myriad of businesses and public facilities to become more accessible to elderly and disabled persons. In 2010 for example, TCRP sued Austin Duck Tours, Congressman Lamar Smith's Austin office, Pure Nightclub in downtown Austin, and the University of Texas at Austin School of Architecture, among other Austin-area establishments, for ADA compliance.

TCRP also helped a woman in a wheelchair sue a Texas movie theater, resulting in national requirements for wheelchair accessibility in theaters.

To commemorate the anniversary of the ADA, TCRP holds a disability rights campaign every summer. TCRP teams up with people from the disability community to enforce the compliance of Texas businesses and institutions with the ADA. In past years, TCRP has sued city buildings, schools, retail stores, restaurants, and hotels, among other businesses, to enforce ADA compliance.

=== Rural economic justice ===
TCRP helps farm laborers and other low-income workers rectify injustice in the workplace and improve working conditions. TCRP's efforts have addressed wage claims, sexual harassment by crew leaders and managers of housing projects, field sanitation, and protecting the right to organize to improve labor conditions and life in the colonias.

To combat predatory financial practices, TCRP also conducts community education and litigation on behalf of low-income Hispanic families cheated on fraudulent land-purchase schemes and exorbitant water district fees in colonias, unincorporated low-income communities along the Texas-Mexico border that often lack basic infrastructure such as potable water, access to electricity, and paved roads.

=== Title IX compliance in secondary school ===
To ensure that girls and young women in Texas schools receive equal treatment and opportunities, TCRP implemented extensive educational efforts and litigation in rural communities regarding student peer sexual harassment and comparable sports and educational benefits in Texas schools.

=== Racial discrimination ===
TCRP also assisted Texans who were discriminated against after the 9/11 attacks. These included American citizens, permanent residents, and university students with South Asian or Arab backgrounds. For example, TCRP helped Mohammed Ali Ahmed, an American citizen who was asked to leave an American Airlines flight with his three children after the pilot saw his name on the passenger manifesto, file suit against American Airlines.

In 2009 TCRP filed a racial discrimination suit against employees of a West Texas inn, on behalf of Gwenda Gault, a woman whose hotel reservation was rejected by the hotel manager because of her race.

=== Criminal justice system ===
The Texas Youth Commission (TYC), a juvenile detention center that earned notoriety after allegations of child sexual abuse emerged, was sued by TCRP on behalf of four children who were physically and sexually abused by TYC guards. In addition to the $625,000 paid to the plaintiffs, TYC also agreed to make significant changes to its operations as a result of the lawsuit.

TCRP also brought a case against the Otero County Sheriff's Department, which resulted in sweeping reform and increased training within the police force, after officials illegally searched homes, harassed and interrogated residents, and racially profiled and stopped citizens to target undocumented immigrants.

TCRP also represented a magazine publisher and filed suit against a jail that had denied inmates access to the publication Prison Legal News. The jail was required to modify the policy as a consequence.

The efforts of TCRP's Prisoners' Rights Program have also led to greater due process rights for paroled Texas prisoners.

=== Police brutality ===
When police responded to a report of a mentally ill man sleeping at a bus station, an officer beat him with a baton and filed a false report causing the man to spend ten weeks in jail. TCRP represented the man in a lawsuit requiring the city to pay him a total of $62,000.

A police officer slammed an African American college student to the ground, knocking him unconscious after the student complained the officer was treating an unrelated suspect too harshly. When an ambulance arrived to take the student to the hospital, the officer took him out of the ambulance and sent him to jail instead. A TCRP lawsuit forced the city to pay $31,000.

=== Protecting free speech ===
TCRP sued the City of Round Rock in 2006, after hundreds of students were arrested and charged with truancy for leaving their classes to protest anti-immigrant sentiment and legislation. The suit was filed on behalf of 98 students whom TCRP represented, claiming that their First Amendment rights had been violated, and was eventually won. The City of Round Rock was forced to halt all prosecutions, erase the arrests from the student's records, and arrange a scholarship fund for the students.

The organization also sued the City of Austin in 2001, after protestors demonstrating against then-President George W. Bush's first visit back to Austin were blocked by police from entering the free speech zone near the Texas Governor's mansion. Eventually, in 2006, a district judge ruled that the City had indeed violated the protestors' First Amendment rights.

When Raul G. Salinas, Mayor of Laredo, had issues with the local newspaper LareDOS being removed from distribution because they contained criticism and caricatures of Salinas, TCRP sued on behalf of the newspaper. TCRP Director James C. Harrington called Salinas' actions "classic political retaliation" against unfavorable coverage. As a result of the suit, Salinas was fined $15,000 and was forced to apologize for violating freedom of the press.

When members of the San Angelo–based American White Knights of the Ku Klux Klan (KKK) came to Austin City Hall to demonstrate in support of Proposition 2, the Texas constitutional amendment that banned gay marriage in 2005, about 3,000 counter-protesters flooded downtown Austin to demonstrate against them. However, the counter-protesters were met by police barricades that kept the counter-protesters two blocks away from where the KKK was demonstrating. Because the counter-protesters were prevented from exercising their rights to free speech and members of the independent media were blocked by the city from covering the protests, TCRP sued the City of Austin for violating the First Amendment. This suit eventually required the city to "establish reasonable perimeters for future demonstrations, and establish objective press credentialing criteria."

=== Right to privacy ===
In 2010, the organization sued the Texas State Department of State Health Services, after Texas parents discovered that the State was, without parental consent, creating a database of newborn babies' blood with the leftover blood from the testing of newborns for serious genetic diseases. The State was also selling these baby blood samples to pharmaceutical companies and the Armed Forces Institute of Pathology, and bartering with it for medical supplies. The lawsuit was settled and all samples taken and stored without parental consent were destroyed. The Texas Legislature took additional action, requiring the State to obtain parental consent to store future samples through an "opt-out" consent form.

== See also ==
- Civil and political rights
- United States Bill of Rights
- Violence Against Women Act
- Violence against LGBT people
