= Daniel Harrington =

Daniel Harrington or Dan Harrington may refer to:

- Daniel C. Harrington (1849–?), American sailor who won the Medal of Honor for his actions in the American Civil War
- Daniel J. Harrington (1940–2014), American Roman Catholic theologian and academic
- Dan Harrington (born 1945), professional poker player
- Dan Harrington (politician) (born 1938), Montana state senator
- Dan Harrington (footballer) (born 1953), former Australian rules footballer
