= Ethelreda Malte =

Putative illegitimate daughter of Henry VIII

Ethel(d)reda Malte (sometimes referred to as Audrey; c. 1527/35 – c. 1559) was an English courtier of the Tudor period who was reputed to be an illegitimate daughter of King Henry VIII. There are other claims that Etheldreda was the daughter of John Malte, Henry VIII's personal tailor. She was the wife of poet and writer John Harington, prior to Isabella Markham.

Contemporary reports claim she was fathered by Henry VIII. Almost nothing is known about her mother, a woman identified as Joan Dingley, alias Dobson; under the circumstances, Joan would have been a member of the lesser nobility, not well-connected at court. One theory is she was a laundress. Though he never openly acknowledged Etheldreda, Henry VIII did give his tailor, John Malte, land and properties, including St Catherine's Court, when Malte recognised her as his illegitimate daughter. John and Etheldreda were wealthy enough to purchase the lordship of Kevelston, which had originally been part of a vast estate associated with the nunnery of Shaftesbury.

When he died in 1547, her putative father (Malte) left her money in his will and, in 1548, the reasonably well-endowed heiress became the first wife of John Harington, an eligible court official who served Lord High Admiral Thomas Seymour (evidently her previous engagement to an illegitimate grandson of Sir Richard Southwell had been cancelled). Etheldreda brought to the marriage properties previously owned by Shaftesbury Abbey. Sometime in 1550, she had a daughter: Hester (or Esther) Harington.

On 18 March 1554, Etheldreda Malte was among the six ladies who accompanied the future queen Elizabeth to the Tower of London, where her rumoured half-sister was imprisoned under suspicion of causing rebellion. Etheldreda was present at the coronation of Elizabeth I on 15 January 1559 and she died that same month. She would remain close to Elizabeth until her death. Her husband remarried within two months of her death. She may have died at St Catherine's Court, her residence near Bath, and perhaps lies buried in the church next door, but this is conjectural, as the church records for the period have been lost.

== Fictional portrayals ==
Audrey is the protagonist of Royal Inheritance, a historical novel by Kate Emerson.
