= Murder of Sophie Hook =

1995 child murder in Wales

Sophie Hook
- Born: Sophie Louise Hook; 27 May 1988; Great Budworth, Cheshire, England
- Died: 30 July 1995 (aged 7); Llandudno, North Wales
- Cause of death: Strangulation
- Known for: Murder victim

The murder of Sophie Louise Hook was a widely reported child murder which took place in Llandudno, North Wales, in July 1995.

Sophie Louise Hook (27 May 1988 – 30 July 1995) was a seven-year-old British child who was murdered in Llandudno, Wales in the early hours of 30 July 1995. She was from Great Budworth, near Northwich, Cheshire, but was staying at the Llandudno home of her grandparents when she was murdered. She had gone missing from a tent where she was camping in her grandparents' garden, and her body was found washed up on a nearby beach several hours later. Howard Hughes was arrested for the murder soon afterwards, and sentenced to life imprisonment after being found guilty in July 1996.

Following his trial, it was revealed that Hughes had been linked to multiple sex attacks against children, but police had been unable to prosecute, either because of a lack of evidence or because the victims' parents had wanted to spare their children further ordeal in court. As Hughes was sentenced, Mr Justice Richard Curtis said: "You are a fiend. Your crime is every parent's worst nightmare come to pass... No girl is, or ever will be, safe from you. My recommendation in view of your appalling crime and the maximum danger you pose to girls, is that you are never, ever released." In November 2002 Home Secretary David Blunkett ruled that Hughes would have to serve a minimum term of 50 years in prison before he could be considered for parole.

== Murder of Sophie Hook ==
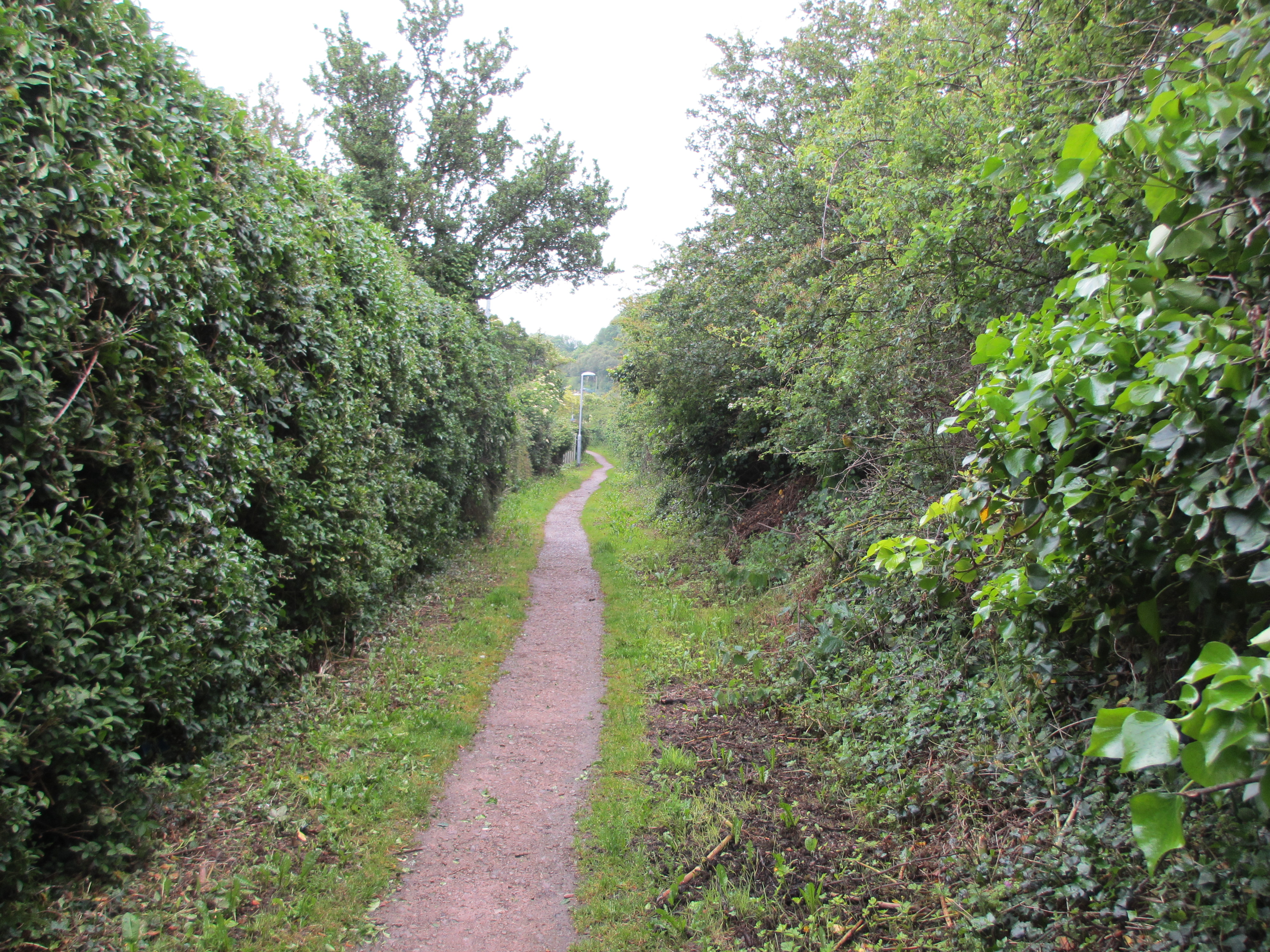
The bridle path running along the rear of the properties

On 29 July 1995, Sophie Hook, aged seven, was visiting relatives in Llandudno with her family to celebrate her cousin's birthday. During the afternoon Sophie stripped to her underpants to play with the children in an inflatable pool in the garden. Hughes is believed to have observed the children including Sophie from a concealed point on a bridle path overlooking the property. Hughes was spotted in the area on his bicycle by several witnesses. He told one of them, a woman walking her dog who saw him crouching in the bushes, that he was looking for money that he had lost. From the bridle path Hughes would have been able to overhear the children's conversations, and was aware that they were planning to spend the night in a tent in the garden. Later that day he is believed to have attempted to abduct six-year-old Alexandra Roberts who was doing handstands in a park less than four minutes' cycle ride from the garden, but the girl ran away.

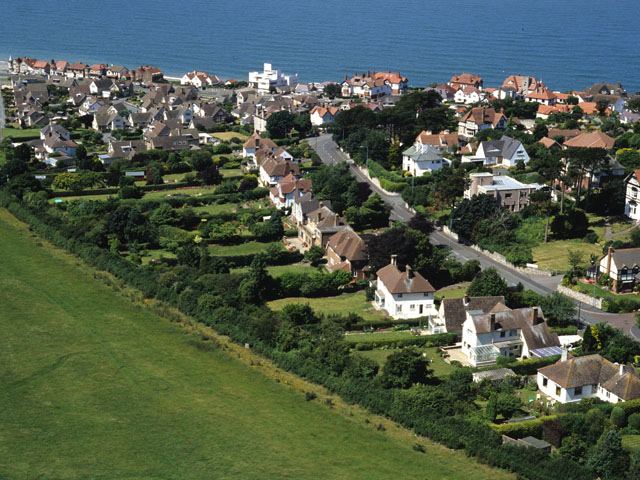
Penrhynside Mountain, the bridle path border the rear of the line of houses on Bryn Y Bia Road.

At 12.20am on 30 July one of the children decided to sleep in the house, although three others including Sophie stayed outdoors. Sophie's grandmother, checked the children at 12.40am before retiring for the night, leaving the door open at the rear of the house in case any of them decided to come in. At 2.30 a.m. Sophie's cousin woke, checked the time, and noticed that Sophie was still in the tent asleep between himself and her sister. At 2.55 a.m. Hughes was spoken to by a police officer who saw him while patrolling the town's promenade. When her cousin next woke at 7.15 a.m. he found Sophie was missing. Having failed to find her after searching the garden and surrounding fields, she was reported missing to the police at 8.20 a.m.

It is believed that Hughes had lifted Sophie, still asleep in her sleeping bag, from the tent at some time in the early hours of 30 July. Her naked body was found washed up on the beach half a mile away at Llandudno at 7.10 a.m. on 30 July 1995 by a local man walking his dog. Examination by Home Office pathologist Dr Donald Waite revealed that she had been subjected to an attack involving "considerable force" which had resulted in her right upper arm and ankle being broken, her body being covered with bruises "consistent with the gripping of the child by hand" and bruising around her head and face was consistent with punching or slapping. The majority of her injuries were comparable to those normally suffered by people killed or seriously injured in major car crashes. All of the injuries were sustained while she was still alive. Death was caused by manual strangulation, lasting up to three minutes, after which her body had been thrown into the sea – probably an effort by her killer to wash away forensic evidence – near a cliff called the Little Orme at the eastern end of Llandudno's promenade. Her clothes – a distinctive pink and white Winnie-the-Pooh nightdress, knickers and a pair of Marks & Spencer socks embossed with pink flowers – were not found at the time.

== Howard Hughes ==
Howard Hughes (born 9 June 1965) was born in Llandudno, Wales, to Gerald and Renee Hughes. He had three older sisters and his father was a "well-respected" civil engineer and businessman operating a successful contracting and quarrying firm. Hughes was born with the sex chromosome abnormality XYY syndrome which caused him to grow at an unusual rate, attaining 6 foot (1.829 metres) by the age of 11, and 6-foot 8 inches (2.032 metres) by adulthood. He also had behavioural problems, learning disabilities and dyslexia.

Hughes's father paid for him to attend private schools "in the hope that they would be able to do something with him" due to his often violent behaviour, as he regularly lashed out at other pupils. When Hughes was rejected after just two terms by Lindisfarne College at Wynnstay, Wrexham, his father unsuccessfully offered to pay double the normal fees if they would keep him as a pupil. In 1975, aged ten, Hughes was sent to Bank Hall, a residential school for educationally subnormal children, in Chapel-en-le-Frith, Derbyshire. In 1979 he transferred to Woodlands private school in Deganwy, Wales. Despite his parents paying for extra private tuition Hughes failed to gain any qualifications. In 1981, when 16 years old, he took a seven-year-old boy into a derelict house where he "exposed himself and made indecent suggestions" before attempting to strangle his victim. The boy later recalled: "He picked me off the ground and threw me down, he was a very strong man. He wound up astride me with both hands around my neck." The boy pretended to be dead until Hughes left. Hughes was convicted of assaulting the boy, placed under a two-year mental health supervision order, and committed under the Mental Health Act to St Andrew's psychiatric hospital, Northampton, followed by Garth Angharad Hospital in Dolgellau, a facility for the treatment of mentally abnormal offenders. On release, Hughes returned to live with his mother, recently separated from his father, in Colwyn Bay, North Wales.

By the age of 19, Hughes had 17 convictions for crimes including assault, burglary, theft, criminal damage, threatening behaviour, motoring offences and possession of weapons. He received two custodial sentences before 1995: As a teenager he served three months in a youth detention centre for the motoring offences. In the late 1980s, he served seven months in an adult prison for theft. Hughes had been accused of indecently assaulting girls aged three, five and nine; police revealed that, during the three years preceding the murder of Sophie Hook, they had interviewed him in connection with five allegations "brought by, or on behalf of, children."

== Arrest ==
The murder inquiry was led by Detective Superintendent Eric Jones from North Wales Police. In a statement to the media he said: "Whoever was responsible for this crime is a very dangerous man, a brute who must be caught – quickly." Hughes was arrested at the home he shared with his mother at 3.50 p.m. on the same day that the body was discovered, and detained at the police station in Rhyl, Clwyd, to assist with their inquiries.

On the morning of 3 August 1995, the Crown Prosecution Service and police agreed that there was not enough evidence to charge Hughes with the murder of Sophie Hook, and he was released at 3.00pm that day, only to be re-arrested over possession of indecent images of children which had been found in a police search of his home. Within seven hours, he was charged with the murder of Sophie Hook, with a police statement citing that this development was "on the basis of further information". He was remanded in custody to await trial the following year.

== Trial ==
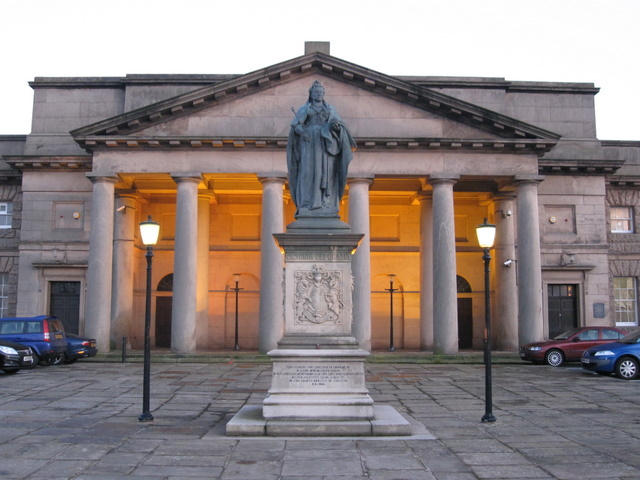
Chester Crown Court

Hughes went on trial at Chester Crown Court on 24 June 1996, charged with abduction, rape and murder. The jury heard no forensic evidence which linked Hughes to the death of Sophie Hook, but they received valuable information from three witnesses. Hughes’ father Gerald told the jury that his son had admitted the murder to him shortly after he was arrested and being held in custody at a local police station (although Hughes himself has always denied that any such confession took place). Jonathan Carroll, a 30-year-old career criminal who was in prison at the time he testified, told the jury that he had seen Hughes carrying a hessian sack along a Llandudno street on the night of Sophie's murder, and that he had caught a glimpse of a naked body in the sack – Carroll himself admitted he was in the process of stealing property from the garden of a house when he saw this happening. A third witness, convicted child sex offender Michael Guidi, testified that Hughes had boasted to him a few years before that he would like to "rape a girl of 4 or 5". The jury also heard details of the injuries that Sophie had sustained in the attack, many of which had been inflicted before she died.

On 18 July 1996, the jury returned a guilty verdict on all three charges against Howard Hughes. The 31-year-old was then given three life sentences by trial judge Mr Justice Curtis, who branded Hughes a "fiend" and recommended that he should never be released from prison. This provisionally placed him within the small group of prisoners who were issued with a whole life tariff, although the Home Office did not immediately confirm Hughes's tariff.

== Appeals ==
On 5 September 1997, the Court of Appeal gave Howard Hughes leave to appeal against his conviction for the abduction, rape and murder of Sophie Hook. Six months later he sparked further outrage by launching a £50,000 compensation claim against the Bryn Estyn children's home, where he claimed he was abused as a child. Two weeks later, the Court of Appeal rejected Hughes's bid to have his convictions quashed.

Hughes's second appeal took place on 4 September 2001, but the Court of Appeal again decided that there were no grounds for his convictions to be quashed. The judges who made the decision also ruled that they would not allow Hughes to further contest his convictions unless any new evidence turned up. Hughes then reportedly decided to challenge his conviction in the European Court of Human Rights, but has so far yet to do this.

His case is supported by INNOCENT, an organization which campaigns against miscarriages of justice.

== Minimum sentence ==
On 24 November 2002, the then Home Secretary David Blunkett announced that four convicted child murderers would each spend a minimum of 50 years behind bars before being considered for parole. Howard Hughes was one of them; the others were Roy Whiting, Timothy Morss and Brett Tyler. This ruling meant that Hughes would not be considered for release until 2045 at the age of 80. The Home Secretary's power of setting minimum terms was stripped 48 hours later as a result of a successful legal challenge in the European Court of Human Rights by convicted double murderer Anthony Anderson. The Home Office described the timing of the Home secretary's decision as "coincidental", in response to any media or legal sources which might have argued that Blunkett had made the decision as he knew he was on the verge of being stripped of these powers. The government was also under public scrutiny for failing to prevent a firefighters' strike at the time, and earlier that month Myra Hindley had died after serving 36 years of her life sentence for her role in the Moors Murders. Hindley's minimum sentence had been increased for 25 to 30 years and then to "whole life" by a succession of Home Secretaries, and her supporters argued that successive Home Secretaries were keeping her in prison to serve the interests of their respective governments.

Although Whiting had his tariff reduced to 40 years on appeal in June 2010, Hughes has yet to challenge the 50-year tariff, while Morss and Tyler have yet to challenge theirs as well.

== British National Party controversy ==
In June 2004, the far-right British National Party came under heavy media and public criticism for distributing literature across North Wales, featuring an image of Sophie Hook and several other victims of similar murders as part of a campaign for a reintroduction of the death penalty. Gerry Davies, the man who found Sophie's body, spoke of his disgust at the BNP's exploitation of the tragedy and stated that it was a "vote loser" for the BNP rather than a "vote winner". The party had not consulted the families of the murdered children for permission to use photographs of the murdered children or the details of their deaths as part of the campaign.

== See also ==
- Abduction of Cleo Smith
- List of kidnappings
- Murder of Alesha MacPhail
