= Sarah Harrington =

British artist

Sarah Harrington was an English miniaturist and silhouette artist active from 1772 until 1787.

Little of Harrington's biography has been established. She is known to have written New and elegant amusements for the ladies of Great Britain, which was published in London in 1772. Other volumes, such as A new introduction to the knowledge and use of maps, were issued under the name of her husband Thomas Harrington, who also wrote a number of books of his own. She patented a pantographic device whereby she could take profiles in 1775; apparently she was threatened with litigation by on Signore Risso, another artist, but nothing is known to have come of it. Harrington claimed in one advertisement to have produced over 30,000 works. Many of her silhouettes were hollow-cut, in which the image was cut from the center of the paper and then delineated with backing of a darker color. She appears to have been active in London and Oxford during her career. One of her silhouettes is in the collection of the Victoria & Albert Museum.
