= James Harrington (1664–1693) =

James Harrington (1664–1693) was a lawyer and poet, son of James Harrington of Waltham Abbey, Essex.

== Education and career ==
Harrington was educated a Westminster School and Christ Church, Oxford, where he graduated B.A. on 28 May 1687, and took the M.A. degree on 8 May 1690. He had in the meantime been called to the bar at the Inner Temple, whence he afterwards migrated to Lincoln's Inn. He rapidly acquired a large practice, being, according to Anthony à Wood, 'much frequented by clients for his wonderful and pregnant knowledge of the common law.'

== Death ==
A career thus brilliantly commenced was cut short by his untimely death, which took place at Lincoln's Inn on 23 Nov. 1693 . He was buried in the north transept of the cathedral, Christ Church, Oxford. His death was lamented in some elegant Latin alcaics by his friend, G. Adams (Musæ Anglicanæ, ii. 37).

== Publications ==
Harrington was the author of a poem in Latin hexameter verse on the death of Charles II, which displays considerable command of the metre (ib. ii. 34). He also wrote:

1. 'Some Reflexions upon a Treatise call'd "Pietas Romana et Parisiensis." Lately printed at Oxon.,' Oxford, 1688, 4to.
2. 'A Vindication of Protestant Charity in Answer to some Passages in Mr. E. M's Remarks on a late Conference' (printed with the 'Reflections,' E.M. being Edward Meredith, a Roman Catholic, and secretary to Sir William Godolphin during his embassy in Spain).
3. 'The Case of the University of Oxford, showing that the city is not concern'd to oppose the Confirmation of their Charters by Parliament. Presented to the House of Commons on Friday, the 24th of Jan. 1689,' Oxford, 1690, fol. and 4to.
4. 'The Case of the University of Oxford' (a broadsheet beginning 'This university enjoyed at the first institution'), Oxford, 1690 (?).
5. 'Some Queries concerning the Election of Members for the ensuing Parliament,' London, 1690 (anon., but stated by Anthony à Wood to be Harrington's).
6. 'A Letter from a Person of Honour at London in Answer to his Friend in Oxfordshire, concerning the ensuing Election of Knights of the Shire for that County,' Oxford, 1690, fol. (written in support of the candidature of Mountague, lord Norris, and Sir Robert Jenkinson, bart.)
7. 'A Defence of the Rights and Privileges of the University of Oxford, containing an Answer to the Petition of the City of Oxford, 1649,' Oxford, 1690, 4to.
8. 'An Account of the Proceedings of the Right Rev. Father in God Jonathan, Lord Bishop of Exeter, in his late Visitation of Exeter College in Oxford,' Oxford, 1690, 4to. The proceedings in question related to the ejection of Dr. Arthur Bury [q. v.]
9. ' A Vindication of Mr. James Colmer, Bach. of Physic, and Fellow of Exeter College in Oxon., from the Calumnies of three late Pamphlets: (1) A Paper published by Dr. Bury (viz. "An Account of the Unhappy Affair"); (2) "The Account Examined;" (3) "The Case of Exeter College Related and Vindicated,"' London, 1691.
10. 'A Defence of the Proceedings of the Right Revd. the Visitor and Fellows of Exeter Coll. in Oxford, with an Answer to (1) "The Case of Exeter Coll. Related and Vindicated;" (2) "The Account Examined"' (at the end 'A Copy of the Proceedings of Dr. Edw. Master upon the Commission of Appeal'), London, 1691, 4to.
11. 'Reasons for Reviving and Continuing the Act for the Regulation of Printing,' 1692, broadsheet.

Harrington also edited, with a life of the author, 'Sermons and Discourses by Dr. Geo. Stradling,' London, 1692, 8vo, and contributed the preface to the first edition of Athenæ Oxonienses, and the introduction to the second volume (1st ed.) Some of his letters are preserved among the Ballard MSS. in the Bodleian Library; others have been published in 'Atterbury's Correspondence,' i. 22, 477.
