= Mark Harrington (painter) =

American-born Europe-based painter (born 1952)

Mark Harrington (born 1952) is an American-born Europe-based painter who has exhibited in Europe and the United States since the early 1990s. He was born in 1952 in Bakersfield, California, moving to the Bay Area during infancy. His father, Richard Harrington, was an architect and craftsman-builder. After divorce, in 1959 Harrington’s mother, Donna Raffety Smith, married the Abstract-Expressionist painter Hassel Smith. The family emigrated permanently to Bristol, England in 1966.

Harrington attended art school in Sheffield (1971–75) and the University of Reading (1975–77). He was a lecturer and department leader at Portsmouth College of Art and Design from 1979 to 1990.

He established a European annexe for the college in Barcelona in 1989 and lived in Catalonia until the mid-1990s. Harrington resigned from the college in 1990 and was subsequently active in painting and furniture-making from 1990 to late 1994. He resumed teaching in Norway in 1994, taking a position as amanuensis and later professor for painting at Vestlandets Kunstakademi, Bergen (1994–97).

Harrington became the founding Director for Nordland Kunst og- Filmskole at Kabelvåg in the Lofoten Islands (1997-99) and then received a residency stipend from the culture department of the city of Munich in 1999-2000, at Villa Waldberta on the Starnbergersee.

Harrington has since worked in upper Bavaria and has exhibited his paintings in Europe and the United States. Weserburg Museum in Bremen (Germany) and Bakersfield Museum of Art (California) gave retrospective exhibitions of Harrington's work in 2011, and 2012, respectively.
