= Pat Harrington (Australian footballer) =

Australian rules footballer

Personal information
- Full name: Patrick Keith Harrington
- Born: 17 March 1928
- Died: 2 July 2011 (aged 83); Colac, Victoria
- Original team: Coragulac
- Height: 173 cm (5 ft 8 in)
- Weight: 76 kg (168 lb)

Playing career^{1}
Years	Club	Games (Goals)
1954	South Melbourne	7 (0)
- ^{1} Playing statistics correct to the end of 1954.

Patrick Keith Harrington (17 March 1928 – 2 July 2011) was an Australian rules footballer who played with South Melbourne in the Victorian Football League (VFL).
