= Adam Harrington =

Adam Harrington may refer to:

- Adam Harrington (basketball) (born 1980), American basketball player
- Adam Harrington (voice actor) (born 1970), American voice actor
- Adam J. Harrington (born 1972), Canadian-American actor and producer
