= Lynching of Levi Harrington =

African American who was lynched in the U.S.

Levi Harrington (died April 3, 1882) was a young African-American who, on April 3, 1882, was abducted from police custody by a large white mob of several hundred participants and lynched in Kansas City, Missouri, hanged from a beam on the Bluff Street Bridge and shot. This followed the fatal shooting of a police officer, Patrick Jones, earlier that day. The next day another man, George Grant, was accused of the crime, and Harrington was declared innocent. However, the evidence against Grant was so weak that he was reportedly tried and acquitted three times and accepted a 2-year prison sentence in a plea bargain on the fourth trial.

== Accusations against Harrington ==
There were reports at the time that the accusations against Levi Harrington were not befitting his character, as a husband and father to five children living near Kansas City. The plaque commemorating his death described Mr Harrington as being "sober and industrious, saved his money, and cared for his family".

Levi Harrington was one of at least 60 African Americans victims of racial terror lynching killed in Missouri between 1877 and 1950.

Another man, George Grant, was captured the same night the lynching took place and charged with the murder of the police officer. In 1884, after hung juries in four separate trials, Grant pleaded guilty to manslaughter and served two years prison before being released. Meanwhile, no one was charged with the murder of Harrington, in spite of having hundreds of witnesses including the officers who were overpowered by the mob.

== 2018 Memorial ==
Harrington was one of almost 4400 racial terror lynchings between 1877 and 1950 in a registry compiled by the National Memorial for Peace and Justice project of the Equal Justice Initiative. A memorial plaque documenting Harrington's lynching is part of this National Memorial for Peace and Justice. It was dedicated in a ceremony Dec. 1, 2018, at the southwest corner of Ermine Chase Jr. Park, at the corner of W. 10th and Summit streets, overlooking the location of the Bluff St. bridge.

Eight months earlier on April 2, 2018, Kansas City Mayor Sly James and other leaders gathered to collect soil from the lynching site and published official acknowledgements of the lynching.

== Community Remembrance Project of Missouri ==
In 2020, in partnership with the Equal Justice Initiative, the Community Remembrance Project of Missouri was formally established by Missourians to work in coordination with communities throughout the state. This project seeks to educate, raise awareness and begin a process of reconciliation for the history of racial injustice concerning African Americans in Missouri.

Beginning in 2018, the Community Remembrance Project of Missouri began collecting jars of soil from lynching sites across the state, with plans to erect more historical markers. As of June 2020, the organization plan has announced plans to establish a permanent exhibit at the Black Archives of Mid-America, located in Kansas City, Missouri, to acknowledge actions racial injustices.

== Vandalism ==
In early 2019 the sign had been defaced with graffiti. On Sunday, June 14, 2020, the plaque was found broken off its pedestal and thrown off a nearby cliff. Rev. Dr. Vernon Howard Jr., the President of the Southern Christian Leadership Conference of Greater Kansas City, was not surprised to hear of the vandalism, citing a resurgence in hate against such black symbols as a revitalised problem. This sort of vandalism reminds us of the need for memorials like this, he added.

According to The Kansas City Star, the sign was removed and believed to have been stolen in early 2026.

== See also ==
- List of lynching victims in the United States
