= Herbert Harington =

English cricketer

Personal information
- Full name: Herbert Henry Harington
- Born: 14 August 1868; Chichester, Sussex
- Died: 1 January 1948 (aged 79); Tunbridge Wells, Kent
- Batting: Right-handed

Domestic team information
- Years: Team
- 1897: Kent
- FC debut: 20 May 1897 Kent v Marylebone Cricket Club (MCC)
- Last FC: 27 May 1897 Kent v Gloucestershire
- Source: CricInfo, 30 August 2021

Herbert Henry Harington (14 August 1868 – 1 January 1948) was a British Army officer and amateur cricketer.

== Early life ==
Harington was born at Chichester in Sussex in 1868, the son of Emanuel and Isabella Harington. His father was an East India Company merchant and indigo planter. He was educated at Cheltenham College, although due to ill health he only attended the school for two years.

== Army career ==
After joining the 4th (3rd Royal Surrey Militia) Battalion, East Surrey Regiment, a militia battalion, as a second lieutenant in 1886, Harington was commissioned in the regular army Lincolnshire Regiment in 1887. He served for four years in India, including at Cawnpore, and was promoted lieutenant in 1890. After briefly returning to the UK, he served at Singapore, at that time part of the Straits Settlement, for two years. He was promoted captain in 1897 and served in South Africa during the Second Boer War. He was part of the force which captured Pretoria, was mentioned in dispatches and awarded the Queen's and King's South Africa Medals with five clasps.

He served in South Africa until March 1904 and retired from the Army at the end of the year, joining the Reserve of Officers. He was mobilized at the outbreak of World War I in 1914, serving in the War Office throughout the war. He was Deputy Assistant Adjutant General in the War Office from 1916 and promoted to the brevet rank of major. He was mentioned in dispatches a further three times and promoted to lieutenant-colonel in the 1919 New Year Honours before rejoining the reserve until he reached the age limit for service in 1922.

== Cricket ==
A keen amateur cricketer, Harington played regularly for army and amateur teams, scoring prolifically in London club cricket as right-handed batsman. He played in two first-class cricket matches for Kent County Cricket Club in 1897, but scored only 49 runs, with a best innings of 34 made against Marylebone Cricket Club (MCC) at Lord's on debut. In club cricket he played for Incogniti, Free Foresters, and MCC as well as in India, and whilst in Singapore, during his army career.

== Later life ==
Harington played at the Royal Eastbourne Golf Club. He died at Tunbridge Wells in Kent in January 1948 aged 79.

== Bibliography ==
- Carlaw, Derek (2020). Kent County Cricketers, A to Z: Part One (1806–1914) (PDF). Cardiff: ACS.
