= Thomas Harrington =

Thomas Harrington may refer to:

- Thomas Harrington (died 1460), English knight
- Thomas Harrington (diver), British Olympic diver
- Thomas Harrington (FBI), Associate Deputy Director of the United States Federal Bureau of Investigation
- Thomas Harrington (footballer), English footballer
- Thomas Harrington & Sons, a coachbuilder
- Tom Harrington (footballer) (1908–1988), Australian rules footballer
- Tom Harrington (journalist), Canadian radio and television journalist
- Thomas Harrington (baseball) (born 2001), American baseball player
