= John Harington (died 1582) =

English royal official

John Harington (by 1517–1582), of Stepney, Middlesex; Kelston, Somerset; Cheshunt, Hertfordshire, and of London, was an English Member of Parliament. He had also been an official working for Henry VIII, then in the service of the then Princess Elizabeth.

== Life ==
Harington served Thomas Seymour, 1st Baron Seymour of Sudeley, husband of Katherine Parr and uncle of King Edward VI.

Harington married Ethelreda Malte (Audrey), an illegitimate daughter of John Malte by Joan Dingley, who was the king's tailor. Contemporary reports also suggest that Etheldreda was an unrecognised illegitimate daughter of Henry VIII. In 1546, John Malte had purchased the manor of Kelston in Somerset on behalf of himself and Etheldreda (Audrey) alias Digneley, "bastard daughter of the said John Digneley alias Dobson", and in September 1546, he made Etheldreda (Audrey), "my bastard daughter begotten upon the body of Joan Digneley", his chief legatee and recipient of all his property in Berkshire, Hertfordshire and Somerset. Etheldreda later died around 1556, leaving behind her husband and daughter Hester.

Harington entered the service of Princess Elizabeth. He was a cultivated man and a poet, who in his visits to Elizabeth at Hatfield turned his talents to the praises of her six gentlewomen, but soon singled out among them Isabella Markham, daughter of Sir John Markham of Cotham. He married her early in 1559. Five years before their marriage, he was imprisoned in the Tower at the same time as the Princess Elizabeth; his first wife and Isabella, both being her Ladies-in-Waiting, had accompanied the princess. In 1561, their son John was born, and Elizabeth, who had now ascended the throne, repaid their loyalty by acting as his godmother. He later became known as a writer at her court, where he was often in trouble. Queen Elizabeth I also granted him the Stoughton Grange Estate in Leicestershire.

== Political career ==
He was a Member (MP) of the Parliament of England for Pembroke in 1547, for Old Sarum in 1559 and Caernarvon Boroughs in 1563.

== Identity ==
Harington lived at Stepney, and is often confused with Sir John Harington of Exton in Rutland, who filled the post of treasurer to the king's camps and buildings. John Harington of Stepney held various offices, but was not 'treasurer', contrary to the National Dictionary of Biography. John Bradford was a servant of the above mentioned Sir John Harington of Exton in Rutland and not John Harington of Stepney.
