= Mike Harrington (tennis) =

American tennis player

- Country (sports): United States

Singles
- Career record: 3–3
- Highest ranking: No. 287 (Dec 26, 1979)

Mike Harrington is an American former professional tennis player.

Harrington is the second eldest of four children born to stage and television actor Pat Harrington Jr., who played Dwayne Schneider on the sitcom One Day at a Time.

A member of the U.S. Junior Davis Cup team, Harrington's best period on the circuit came over the course of a fortnight in 1979 when he scored upset wins over world number 25 Brian Teacher at the Louisville Open and Australian Davis Cup player Colin Dibley at the South Orange Open.

At collegiate level he played for the UCLA Bruins and was team captain for two years, as well as an All-American in 1979.
