= Chris Harrington =

Chris Harrington may refer to:

- Chris Harrington (American football) (born 1985), American football player
- Chris Harrington (ice hockey) (born 1982), ice hockey player
- Chris Harrington (footballer) (1891–1978), English footballer
- Chris Harrington (Home and Away), a fictional character in the Australian soap opera Home and Away
