= Scott Harrington =

Scott Harrington may refer to:

- Scott Harrington (racing driver) (born 1963), American racing driver
- Scott Harrington (ice hockey) (born 1993), Canadian ice hockey player
