= Robert A. Harrington =

American cardiologist

Robert A. Harrington is an American cardiologist who is the dean of Weill Cornell Medicine and the Provost for Medical Affairs at Cornell University. He was previously a dual professor of health policy and the Arthur L. Bloomfield Professor of Medicine at Stanford University from 2012 to 2024, during period he was the chairman of the Stanford Department of Medicine from 2012 to 2013.

== Early life and education ==
Harrington was born and raised in Somerville, Massachusetts, around Winter Hill. The first member of his family to attend college, he graduated from the College of the Holy Cross with a Bachelor of Arts, magna cum laude, in English literature. He then studied medicine at the Geisel School of Medicine of Dartmouth College from 1982 to 1984. In 1986, he earned his Doctor of Medicine (M.D.) from the Tufts University School of Medicine. After graduating from medical school, Harrington was the chief resident in internal medicine at the University of Massachusetts Medical Center at Worcester.

== Career ==
In July 1990, Harrington became a professor at the Duke Clinical Research Institute, where he eventually became the institute's director. He moved in June 2012 to become the Arthur L. Bloomfield Professor of Medicine at Stanford University and remained there until February 2024. In September 2023, he was named the dean of Weill Cornell Medicine.

From 2019 to 2020, Harrington was the 84th president of the American Heart Association.
