= Odile Harington =

Eone Odile Harington (born 1961) was an alleged South African agent.

== Early life ==
Odile Harington was born in 1961 and lived in Johannesburg. At the age of 23 Harington was an agent of South African military intelligence and was sent to Zimbabwe to infiltrate the African National Congress and send back plans of the organizations' buildings in Harare.

== Arrest and trial ==
Harington was arrested by police and interrogated by the Central Intelligence Organization. At her trial before the Zimbabwe High Court in November 1987 Odile testified that she had been tortured before February 1987 at a place called Daventry House, while she was being held at Mabelreign police station in Harare, and after May 1987 at the CIO detention centre in Goromonzi. She described repeated sexual assaults, severe beatings, burnings with cigarettes and other humiliating treatment. She claimed that an ANC official and her superior had taken part in her torture. According to her testimony, the ANC official beat her on the soles of the feet with a hosepipe and half-drowned her by ducking her head repeatedly in a container of water. This evidence was not challenged in court. Chief Justice Dumbutshena cited her torture in mitigation when he reduced her sentence on appeal.

Odile was sentenced to 25 years in jail on 27 November 1987. On 3 December 1987, the South Africa Commissioner of Police said that Odile was not a spy and had not received any training or compensation.

== Release and return to South Africa ==
Sources in Harare stated that she was handed to South African officials on 1 November 1990, and flown to South Africa within hours. Odile had spent about six and a half years in jail when released. Her release followed years of pressure by South African officials. The report stated that no confirmation of Odile's release could be obtained from Pretoria that Thursday night. The Pretoria News, however, did cover further reports confirming her release.

Clandestine Radio Watch cited a report from Clandestine Calling magazine in December 1990 linking the closure of Radio Truth to Odile's release.
