= Mark Harrington (anti-abortion activist) =

American pro-life activist

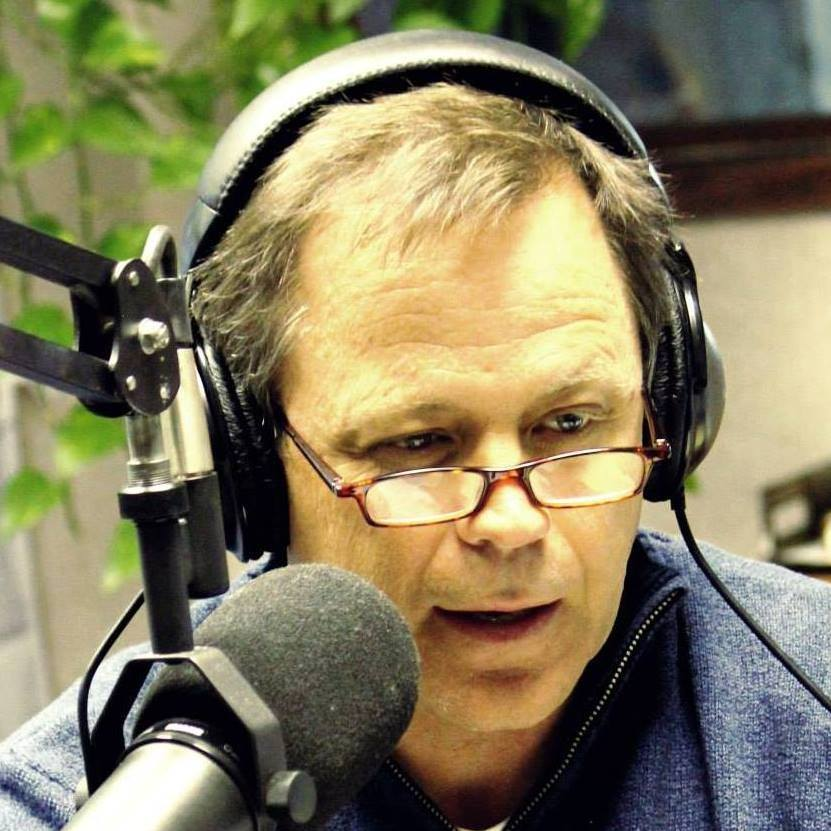
Mark Harrington

Mark Harrington is an American anti-abortion activist. From 1999 to 2011, he was the executive director of the Midwest office of the Center for Bio-Ethical Reform and president of the Pro-Life Institute. In 2011, Harrington became the founder and executive director of Reform America, DBA Created Equal.

== Early life and education ==
Harrington grew up in Columbus, Ohio, and graduated from The Ohio State University with a B.A. in Marketing and Economics. He began full-time anti-abortion work in 1998.

Harrington traveled to universities debating students on bio-ethical issues such as abortion, embryonic stem cell research, and cloning. As part of the Genocide Awareness Project, Harrington spoke on some of the nation's largest university campuses, reaching thousands of college students and faculty each year.

== The Mark Harrington Show ==
Harrington hosts Activist Radio: The Mark Harrington Show. Harrington has appeared in several national newspapers including USA Today, and on national television programs such as CBS' Good Morning.

== Use of graphic images ==
Harrington is among anti-abortion activists who use images of aborted fetuses in training efforts and public outreach. This has raised controversy among groups finding the display too graphic. Oftentimes, Created Equal representatives will argue that their use of graphic imagery to raise public awareness about abortion is similar to the use of photographs of Holocaust victims. A counter-demonstration held during a Genocide Awareness Project at Ohio State University included twenty protesters and others who claimed that GAP's tactics were "aggressive, unsettling and intimidating." The anti GAP protesters had banners saying "Keep GAP off campus" and "Stop exploiting the Holocaust."

Harrington's response to criticism of the graphic images includes the following:

People may say they are too graphic, or that they aren't real, but this is undisputed photographic evidence that abortion is an act that kills a baby . . . Very few people will say, 'That's real. That's a baby. I'm still pro-choice,' . . . Instead, they will do all they can to discredit the argument and ignore that there's a white elephant sitting in the living room that cannot be ignored.
