= Edward Harrington =

Edward Harrington may refer to:

- Edward Harrington (politician) (c. 1852–1902), Irish politician, member of parliament (MP) for West Kerry 1885–1892
- Edward Harrington (poet) (1895–1966), Australian poet and short story writer
- Edward F. Harrington (1933–2025), U.S. federal judge
- Edward F. Harrington (state representative) (1878–1951), member of the Massachusetts House of Representatives
- Edward Harrington (1935–2018), American blues musician better known as Eddy Clearwater
- Ed Harrington (1941–2011), Canadian football player
- Edward H. Jennings (1937–2019), president of University of Wyoming and The Ohio State University

== See also ==
- Edward Harington (disambiguation)
