= Isabella Markham =

16th-century English lady-in-waiting

Isabella Markham (28 March 1527 – 20 May 1579), was an English courtier, a Gentlewoman of the Privy Chamber of Queen Elizabeth I and a personal favourite of the queen. Isabella Markham was muse to the court official and poet John Harington (c.1529 - 1582), who wrote sonnets and poems addressed to her, before and after they married. Thomas Palfreyman dedicated his Divine Meditations to her in 1572.

== Family ==
Isabella Markham was born on 28 March 1527 in Ollerton, Nottinghamshire, England, the daughter of Sir John Markham of Cotham (before 1486- 1559) and his third wife, Anne Strelley. She had two brothers: Thomas, who married Mary Griffin, by whom he had issue, including Sir Griffin Markham; and William, whose wife was Mary Montagu. Her elder sister, Frances was the first wife of Henry Babington, whose son (by his second wife Mary Darcy) Anthony Babington would be executed for having organised an assassination plot against Queen Elizabeth.

The Markhams were an ancient family, who traced their agnatic line of descent from Claron, who had held the manor of West Markham at the time of the Norman Conquest in 1066. Claron's descendants assumed the name of de Marcham which was anglicised into Markham, and had often distinguished themselves in English history throughout the centuries since their ancestor Claron had served Edward the Confessor.

== In the household of Elizabeth I ==
She joined the household of Lady Elizabeth Tudor as one of her ladies-in-waiting sometime before 1549. When the princess was arrested in March 1554 by the orders of her half-sister, Queen Mary I, for suspected treason, Markham, described as having been a favoured lady-in-waiting, accompanied the princess to the Tower of London, where her father had served as Lieutenant from 1549 to 31 October 1551. While there she encountered her long-standing admirer, the poet John Harington, who was imprisoned as the result of a letter which linked him to Thomas Wyatt's conspiracy against Queen Mary. He was married to another of Elizabeth's attendants, Ethelreda Malte, a rumoured illegitimate daughter of Henry VIII, who had also joined the princess in the Tower. He had been enamoured of Markham sometime before 1549 (this is the date of his first sonnet to her), when he had later reminisced that he had "firste thought her fayre as she stode at the Princesse's windowe in goodlye attyre, and talkede to dyvers in the Courte-Yard". As Harington had previously been imprisoned in the Tower from early 1549 to the spring of 1550 for complicity in the treason of Thomas Seymour, 1st Baron Seymour of Sudeley, and his involvement in the plot to bring about a marriage between King Edward VI and Lady Jane Grey, The object of his love was in fact the daughter of his former jailer. Sir John Markham served as Lieutenant of the Tower during the period of Harington's incarceration.

Elizabeth was moved to Woodstock Palace in May and placed under house arrest, and it is not known if Markham went with her; however, upon Elizabeth's return to her residence at Hatfield House in October 1555, Markham was installed once more in the princess's household as one of her six gentlewomen. Harington, having already secured his own freedom in January 1555, paid frequent visits to Hatfield, where he encountered Markham. He was described as having already been very much in love with her in the early years of Mary I's reign.

Upon Elizabeth's ascension to the throne in 1558 as Elizabeth I, Markham was appointed a Gentlewoman of the Privy Chamber, a post she held for the rest of her life.

== Poet's muse ==
Markham, who was described as having possessed "great beauty" inspired Harington to write letters and pay homage to her in poems and sonnets, usually addressing her as "Sweete Isabella Markham". He had started composing the sonnets as early as 1549 when she was 22 years old. One of these reads in part as follows:

"John Haryngton to Isabella Markham, 1549

Question.
Alas! I love you overwell,
Myne owne sweete deere delygte!
Yet, for respects I feare to tell
What moves my trobled spryghte:
What workes my woe, what breeds my smarte,
What wounds myn harte and mynde;
Reason restrayns me to emparte
Such perylls as I fynde."

== Marriage ==
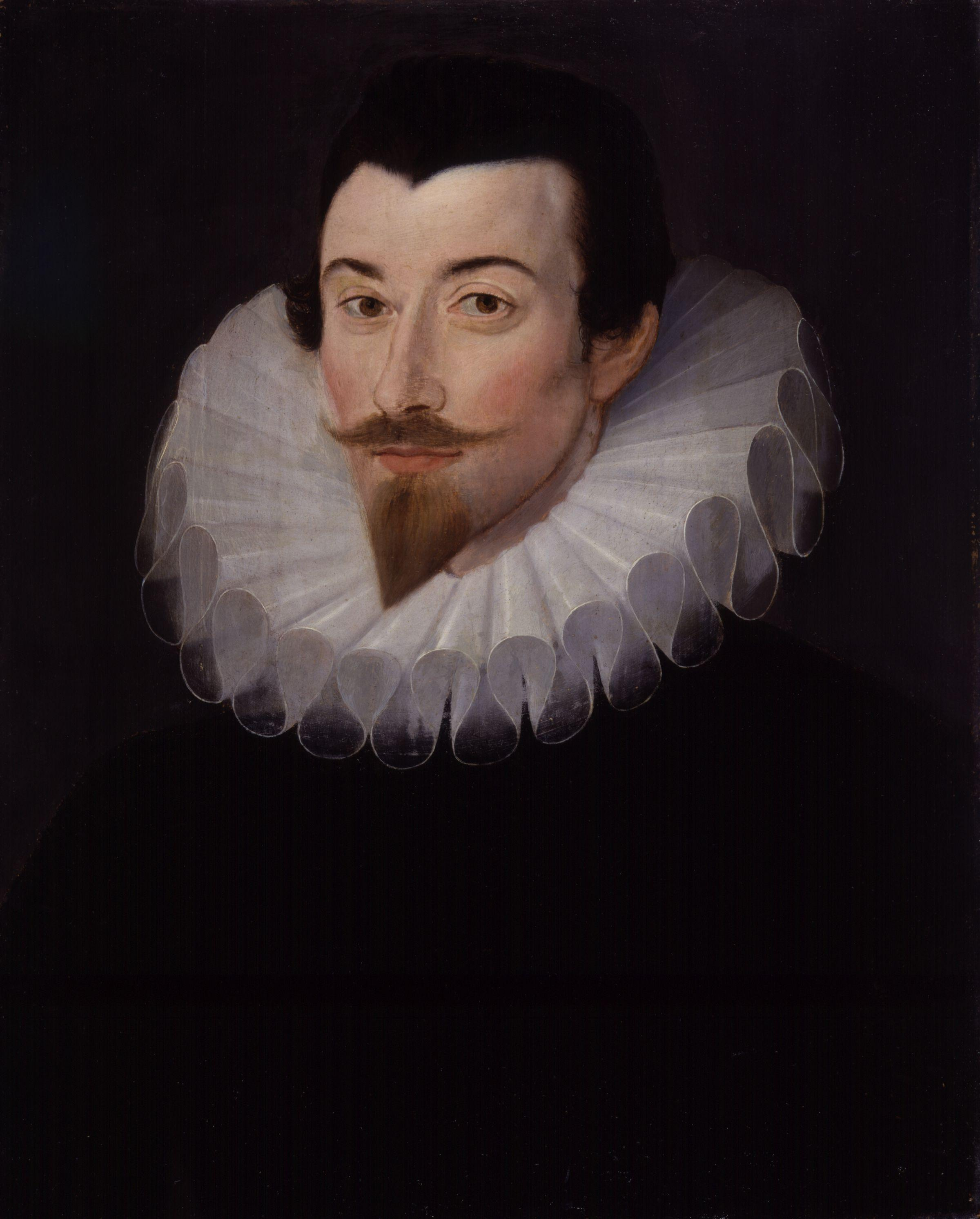
Portrait of Isabella Markham's eldest son, Sir John Harington, author, godson of Queen Elizabeth I, and a prominent figure at her court

Sometime in 1559, after the death of his first wife, which occurred before 1 April, Markham married Harington, who had inherited considerable property from the childless Ethelreda. The match met with the Queen's approval as both Isabella Markham and John Harington were held in high favour. This was made manifest when Elizabeth stood as godmother to Markham's first child, John on 4 August 1561, with Thomas Howard, 4th Duke of Norfolk, and William Herbert, 1st Earl of Pembroke, acting as the infant's godfathers. The baptism took place at the Church of All Hallows, London Wall.

Together Markham and her husband had three children:

- Sir John Harington (before 4 August 1561 – 20 November 1612), author, courtier, and inventor of the flush toilet. He married Mary Rogers (1565–1634), daughter of Sir George Rogers and Jane Winter, by whom he had nine children.
- Elizabeth Harington (born c.1560)
- Francis Harington (1564 – 22 January 1639), married Jane Baylie

Thomas Palfreyman dedicated his Divine Meditations to Markham in 1572.

She was still in the Queen's service when she died on 20 May 1579 at the age of 52. She was buried in St. Gregory's by St. Paul's in London; her husband was later buried beside her.

== Sources ==
- Ian Grimble, The Harington Family (1958), St Martin's Press, New York
