= Richard C. Harrington =

British psychiatrist

Richard Charles Harrington (1956-10-22 in Birmingham – 2004-05-23 in Manchester) was professor of child and adolescent psychiatry at the University of Manchester, England. His work on psychiatric disorders of children and adolescents, especially on children with depressive illness, is a milestone in this medical field.
