= Pat Harrington Jr. =

American actor (1929–2016)

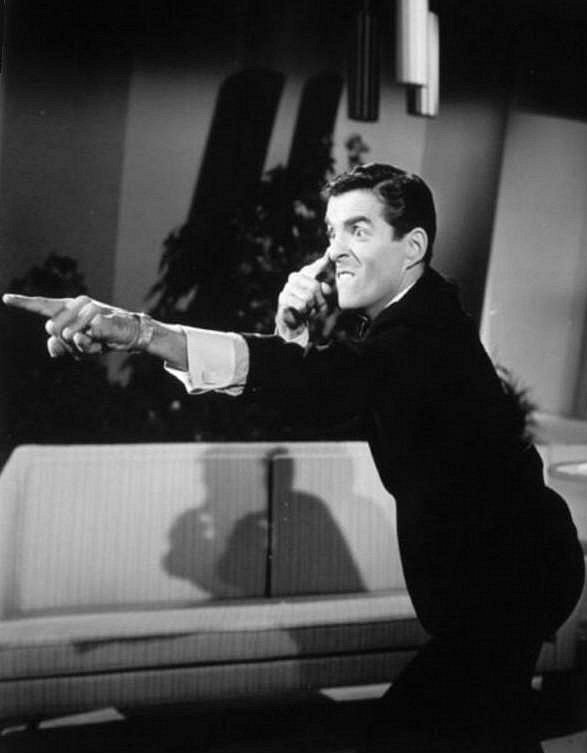
- Harrington as host of Stump the Stars, 1962
- Born: Daniel Patrick Harrington Jr. August 13, 1929; New York City, U.S.
- Died: January 6, 2016 (aged 86); Los Angeles, California, U.S.
- Education: Fordham University (BA) (MA); La Salle Military Academy
- Occupation: Actor
- Years active: 1953–2016
- Known for: One Day at a Time; The Danny Thomas Show
- Spouses: Marjorie Ann Gortner (m. 1955; div. 1985) Sally Cleaver (m. 2001)
- Children: 4
- Father: Pat Harrington Sr.

Daniel Patrick Harrington Jr. (August 13, 1929 – January 6, 2016) was an American Emmy Award–winning stage and television actor, best known for his role as building superintendent Dwayne Schneider on the sitcom One Day at a Time (1975–1984). His father Pat Harrington Sr. was also an actor.

== Early life ==
Harrington was born in Manhattan on August 13, 1929.

His father was a song and dance man who worked in vaudeville and performed on the Broadway stage. Harrington attended a Catholic military school, La Salle Military Academy in Oakdale, New York. then graduated from Fordham University in 1950 with a bachelor of arts and subsequently received a master's degree in political philosophy, also from Fordham. During the Korean War, Harrington served as an intelligence officer with the U.S. Air Force, where he achieved the rank of first lieutenant.

Following in his father's footsteps, he pursued a career in entertainment after graduating from college and completing military service. He took a job at NBC in New York City. He then began acting on stage and toured North America with several plays, eventually performing on Broadway.

== Career ==
Harrington became known in the 1950s as a member of Steve Allen's television comedy troupe, "Men on the Street" (which included Don Knotts, Tom Poston and Louis Nye). He made many appearances as the comedic Italian immigrant golf pro Guido Panzini on The Jack Paar Show in the mid-1950s. In the 1959–60 season, he played the recurring role of Pat Hannigan in 11 episodes of Danny Thomas's sitcom The Danny Thomas Show.

In the 1964–1965 television season, he guest-starred on numerous programs, including the sitcom The Bing Crosby Show and Kentucky Jones (starring Dennis Weaver). In a 1965 episode of The Man from U.N.C.L.E. ("The Bow-Wow Affair"), Harrington reprised his role as Guido Panzini (who he also played in the February 8, 1966, episode of McHale's Navy "McHale's Country Club Caper"). On April 6, 1965, Harrington appeared in an episode of Mr. Novak (starring James Franciscus) titled "There's a Penguin in My Garden." He also guest-starred on two episodes of The Munsters.

In 1967, he appeared in the Elvis Presley film Easy Come, Easy Go. He also parodied Get Smart in an episode of F Troop, in which he played secret agent "B Wise". From 1971 to 1974, he appeared in 11 episodes as District Attorney Charlie Giannetta of the ABC legal drama Owen Marshall: Counselor at Law, starring Arthur Hill in the title role.

Harrington worked as a voice actor, including Ray Palmer/the Atom and Roy Harper/Speedy on The Superman/Aquaman Hour of Adventure in 1967. From 1965 to 1969, Harrington portrayed the voices of both The Inspector (a character inspired by Inspector Jacques Clouseau) and his sidekick Deux Deux in all of the original 34 animated episodes of the character's eponymous series, created by Mirisch Films and DePatie-Freleng and released via United Artists. They later were shown as part of the Pink Panther cartoon TV show. Another cartoon voice he did was Jon's father on A Garfield Christmas Special.

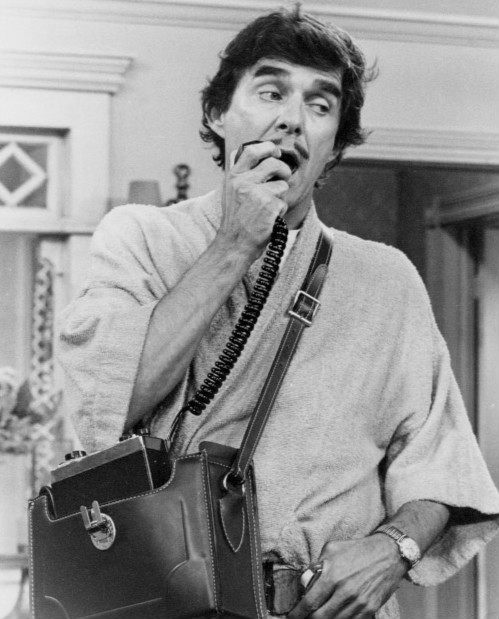
Pat Harrington Jr. on One Day at a Time (1976)

In 1974, he appeared with Peter Falk and Robert Conrad in the Columbo episode An Exercise in Fatality. Harrington is best known for his role as building superintendent Dwayne Schneider on the 1975–1984 television sitcom One Day at a Time. He won both an Emmy Award and a Golden Globe Award for his work on this series.

He played Hank Vosmik, a crew member who wins the heart of Florence Henderson's character Diane DeMarco in The Love Boat S2E11 "Captain's Cup", 1978. In 1979, Harrington appeared as a celebrity guest star/game show contestant on Password Plus. He reprised his role as Schneider in a series of commercials in the late 1980s for Trak Auto Parts after the show ended. He appeared in an episode of The King of Queens in 2006.

On the stage, he made his Broadway debut as Walter Bagley in Happiness Is Just a Little Thing Called a Rolls Royce. He performed in the national tour of Show Boat as Cap'n Andy Hawks in 1997 and 1998. In 2000, he appeared in a regional production of Into the Woods as the Narrator.

Harrington twice appeared on former co-star Valerie Bertinelli's television shows. In 1990, he appeared on Sydney and in 2012 he appeared in Hot in Cleveland, (in his final acting role).

== Personal life ==
Harrington married Marjorie Ann Gortner in 1955; the couple had four children, including tennis player Mike Harrington. They divorced in 1985. He married Sally Cleaver, an insurance executive, in 2001.

=== Death ===
Harrington, who had been diagnosed with Alzheimer's disease in 2012, was hospitalized with a brain hemorrhage after a fall in November 2015. He died on January 6, 2016, at the age of 86.

== Selected filmography ==
Year	Title	Role	Notes
1959	The Danny Thomas Show	Pat Hannigan	11 Episodes
1960	Alfred Hitchcock Presents	Insurance Man	Season 5 Episode 31: "I Can Take Care of Myself"
1963	The Wheeler Dealers	Buddy Zack	
1963	Move Over, Darling	District Attorney	
1965	The Man from U.N.C.L.E.	Guido Panzini	Season 1 Episode 20: "The Bow Wow Affair"
1965	Mr. Novak	Thomas Kelly	Season 2 Episode 27: "There's a Penguin in My Garden"
1965–1969	The Inspector	Inspector / Sergeant Deux-Deux / Wight / Captain Clamity / Doctor / Bear	Thirty-four shorts
1966	McHale's Navy	Guido Panzini	Season 4 Episode 21: "McHale's Country Club Caper"
1967	Easy Come, Easy Go	Judd Whitman	
1967	The President's Analyst	Arlington Hewes	
1969	2000 Years Later	Franchot	
1969	The Computer Wore Tennis Shoes	Moderator	
1969–1970	The Pink Panther Show	Inspector / Sergeant Deux-Deux	voice
1970	The Partridge Family	Harry	Season 1 Episode 7: "Danny and the Mob"
1972	Every Little Crook and Nanny	Willie Shakespeare	
1972	The Candidate	Dinner MC	Uncredited
1972	The New Scooby-Doo Movies	Moe Howard	Voice, Episodes: "Ghastly Ghost Town" and "The Ghost of the Red Baron"
1973	The Partridge Family	Roger Harper	Season 4 Episode 8: "The Diplomat"
1973	Savage	Russell	
1973	The Rookies	Cry Wolf	Season 2, Episode 6
1974	The Nine Lives of Fritz the Cat		Voice
1974	Columbo	Buddy Castle	Season 3 Episode 24: "An Exercise in Fatality"
1975–1984	One Day at a Time	Dwayne Schneider / Guido Panzini (for 1 episode in 1983)	Main actor (209 episodes)
1975	Kolchak: The Night Stalker	Thomas Kitzmiller	Season 1 Episode 13: "Primal Scream"
1977	The Love Boat	Ernie Klopman	Season 1 Episode 0: Pilot
1978	The Love Boat	Hank Vosnick	Season 2 Episode 12
1980	The Love Boat	Prince Hassan	Season 4 Episode 4
1984	The Love Boat	Dr. Milton Foster	Season 8 Episodes 2 & 3
1985	Murder, She Wrote	Assistant District Attorney Mel Comstock	Season 1 Episode 19: "Footnote to Murder"
1987	Murder, She Wrote	Gunnar Globle	Season 3 Episode 12: "The Corpse Flew First Class"
1989	Murder, She Wrote	Lieutenant Lou Brickman	Season 6 Episode 5: "Jack and Bill"
1991	Murder, She Wrote	Nick Cullhane	Season 7 Episode 22: "The Skinny According to Nick Cullhane"
1991	The Golden Girls	John	Season 7 Episode 7: “Dateline: Miami”
1995	Roseanne	Himself	Season 8 Episode 3: "Roseanne in the Hood"
1996	Round Trip to Heaven	George	
2001	Ablaze	Stuart Ridgley	
2005	Curb Your Enthusiasm	Mac, Larry's Neighbor	Season 5 Episode 7: "The Seder"
2012	Hot in Cleveland	Mr. Sherden	Season 4 Episode 4: “GILFs”

== Awards and honors ==
- 1980: Golden Globe Award – Best Supporting Actor in a Television Series – One Day at a Time
- 1984: Primetime Emmy Award – Outstanding Supporting Actor in a Comedy Series – One Day at a Time
- 2003: TV Land Awards – Nosiest Neighbor – One Day at a Time (nominated)
