= James C. Harrington =

American civil rights lawyer

James "Jim" C. Harrington is a Texas civil rights lawyer and founder of the Texas Civil Rights Project. Dedicated to social justice, he fought for workers' rights alongside Cesar Chavez and the United Farm Workers. Harrington had a reputation for taking on powerful adversaries, including the Texas Supreme Court and the Texas State Bar. He worked on a variety of cases, including civil rights, worker's rights, racial discrimination, as well as many cases under the Americans with Disabilities Act (ADA). Harrington was an adjunct law professor at University of Texas, popular with students who sought more than a theoretical perspective.

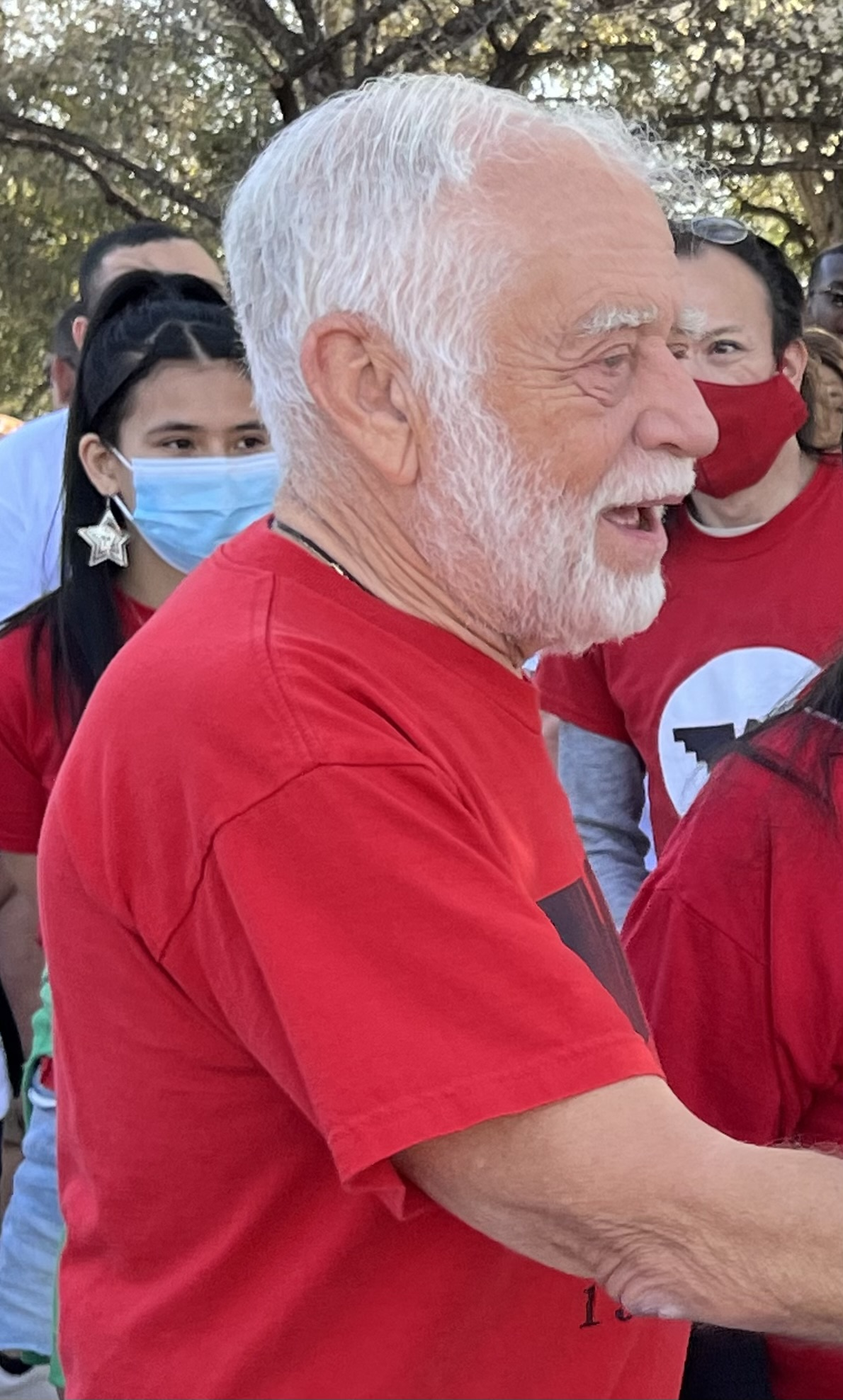
Harrington at Casar Chavez March

== Early life ==
Influenced by his Irish Catholic childhood and summers working with migrant farm workers in Michigan, Harrington grew up wanting to help the poor. At first he studied to be a priest, however after eight years he had a revelation that he could be a more effective advocate as a lawyer. He enrolled in law school at the University of Detroit, where he met Rebecca Flores. They married in 1972. The next year they moved to Texas and Harrington began working for the Texas branch of the American Civil Liberties Union.

== Career ==
Harrington worked with the Texas branch of the American Civil Rights Union from 1973 to 1990. He collaborated with the organizing and litigation efforts of United Farm Workers and Cesar Chavez to secure farm workers' rights to sanitary facilities, toilets, and drinking water in the fields. Harrington served as Chavez' lawyer for 18 years. They also secured unemployment benefits, workers’ compensation, and the right to know about dangerous chemicals used in the workplace. In 1981 they won a Texas ban on the use of the short-handled hoe, which caused permanent injuries to farm workers.

In 1978, Harrington founded Oficina Legal del Pueblo Unido, Inc. (OLPU) as a grassroots foundation in South Texas. Its South Texas Project, led by Harrington, became the Texas Civil Rights Project in September 1990.

The establishment of Texas Civil Rights Project marked the end of Harrington working for the Texas Civil Liberties Union. He said that the TCLU more interested in classic civil liberties issues, like free speech, while he was focused on racial justice issues.

Under Harrington's leadership, the TCRP had a significant impact, winning many civil rights cases. These included the areas of disability rights, rural economic justice, compliance with Title IX, the criminal justice system, racial discrimination, police brutality and the right to privacy.

After leading the TCRP for 25 years Harrington retired in 2015. In a departing piece published in the Texas Observer, he expressed his passion for civil rights and his desire to continue to serve, but by working "directly with people in a different way."

Since retiring from TCRP, Jim Harrington has served as the director of Proyecto Santiago at St. James’ Episcopal Church in Austin and was ordained to the priesthood in 2020.

In 2023, Harrington authored a complaint asking the Texas State Bar to stop Ken Paxton from practicing law in the state, accusing him of abuse of office and other misconduct, including bribery and organized crime. Three former State Bar of Texas presidents and ten other lawyers joined Harrington in the complaint.

== Bibliography ==
- (2014) Three Mystics Walk Into A Tavern (by James C. Harrington and Sidney G. Hall III)
