= John Harington (writer) =

English courtier and inventor (1560–1612)

Sir John Harington
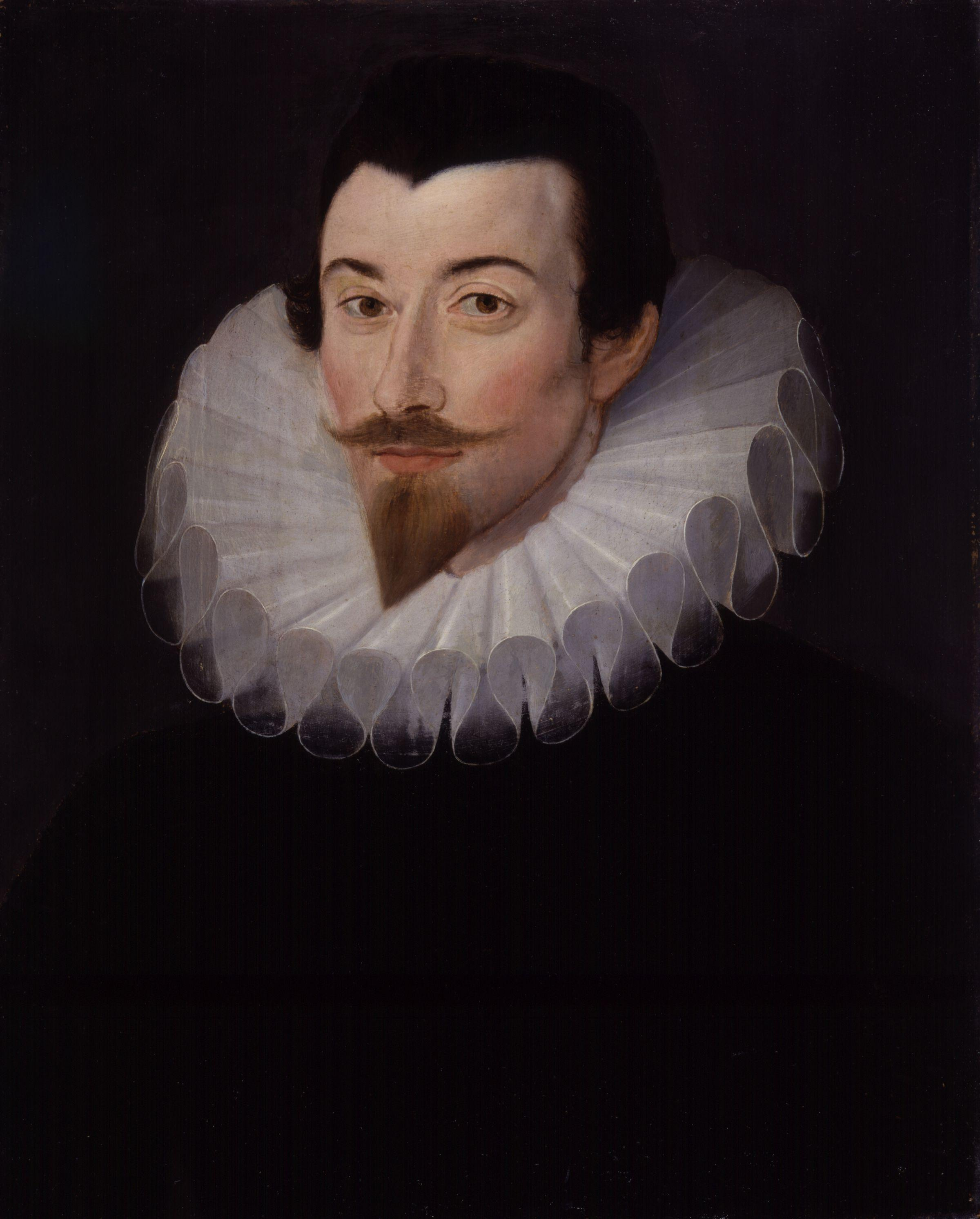
- Portrait by Hieronimo Custodis, c. 1591–1593
- Born: Kelston, Somerset, England
- Baptised: 4 August 1560
- Died: 20 November 1612 (aged 52); Kelston, Somerset, England
- Education: Eton College
- Alma mater: King's College, Cambridge
- Occupations: author; translator; inventor
- Known for: Modern flush toilet
- Spouse: Mary Rogers
- Parents: John Harington of Stepney (father); Isabella Markham (mother)

Sir John Harington (4 August 1560 – 20 November 1612) was an English courtier, author and translator popularly known as the inventor of the flush toilet. Born in Kelston, Somerset, he became prominent at Queen Elizabeth I's court, and was known as her "saucy Godson", but his poetry and other writings caused him to fall in and out of favour with the Queen. He was the author of the description of a flush toilet forerunner installed in his Kelston house, which appeared in A New Discourse of a Stale Subject, called the Metamorphosis of Ajax (1596), a political allegory and coded attack on the monarchy which is nowadays his best-known work.

== Early life and family ==
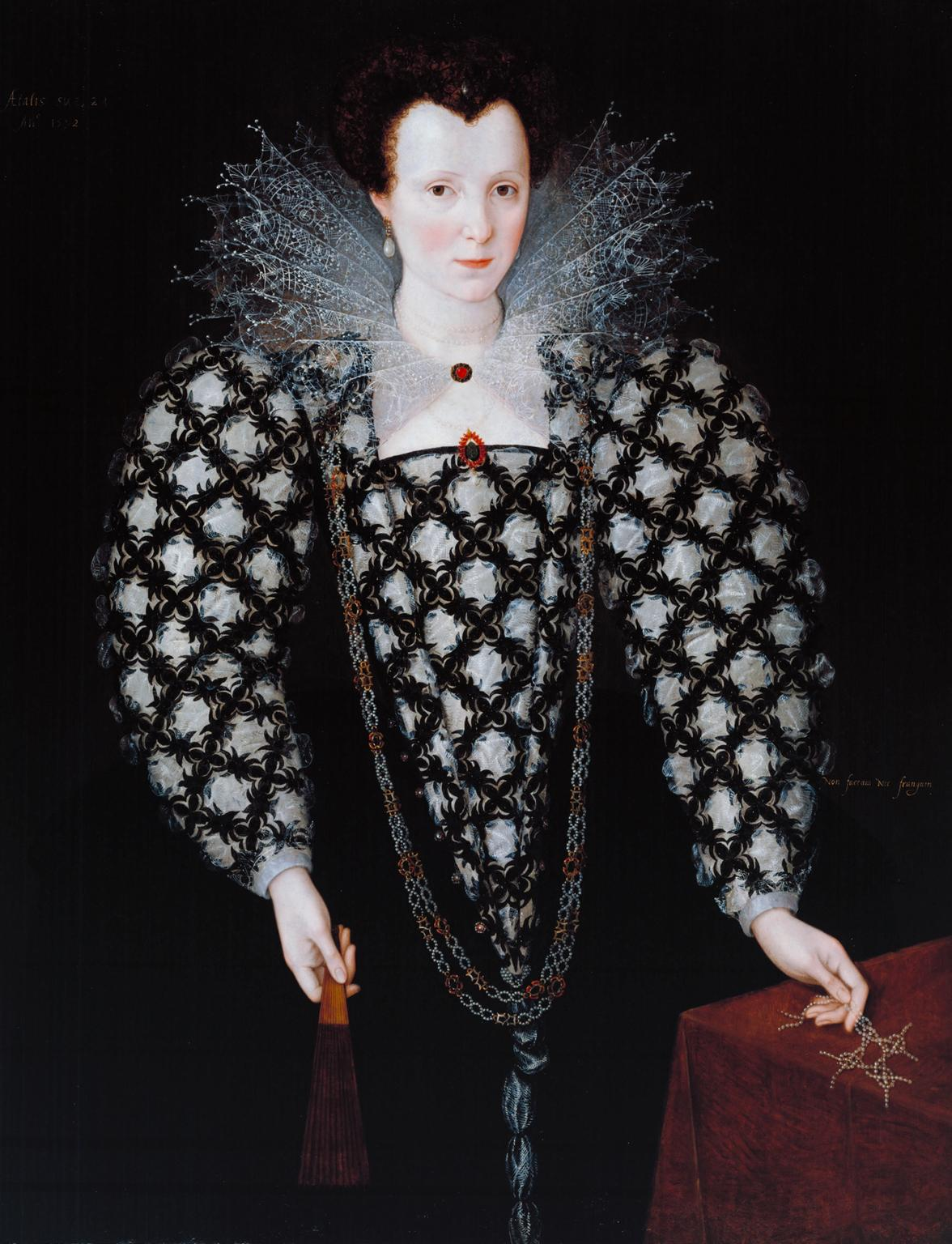
Marcus Gheeraerts the Younger's portrait of (probably) Mary Rogers, Lady Harington

Harington was born in Kelston, Somerset, England, the son of poet John Harington of Stepney (born c. 1529) and his second wife Isabella Markham, a gentlewoman of Queen Elizabeth I's privy chamber. He was the grandson of an Alexander Harington of Stepney, about whom little is known. He was honoured as a godson of the childless Queen Elizabeth, one of 102.

Harington was educated at Eton and King's College, Cambridge. He married Mary Rogers, daughter of George Rogers of Cannington (son of Sir Edward Rogers) and Jane Winter, on 6 September 1583.

A notable descendant of his is the English actor Kit Harington.

== Courtier under Elizabeth I ==
Although he had studied the law, Harington was attracted early in life to the royal court, where his free-spoken attitude and poetry gained Elizabeth's attention. Elizabeth encouraged his writing, but Harington was inclined to overstep the mark in his somewhat Rabelaisian and occasionally risqué pieces.

His attempt at a translation of Ariosto's Orlando Furioso caused his banishment from court for some years. Angered by the raciness of his translations, Elizabeth told Harington that he was to leave and not return until he had translated the entire poem. She chose this punishment rather than actually banishing him, but she considered the task so difficult that it was assumed Harington would not bother to comply. Harington, however, chose to follow through with the request and completed the translation in 1591. It received great praise, and is one of the translations still read by English speakers today.

One of his epigrams is widely quoted:

Treason doth never prosper? What's the reason?
for if it prosper, none dare call it treason.

Around that time, Harington also devised England's first flushing toilet – called the Ajax (i.e., a "jakes", then a slang word for toilet). It was installed at his manor in Kelston. This forerunner to the modern flush toilet had a flush valve to let water out of the tank and a wash-down design to empty the bowl. What it lacked was an S-bend or U-bend to curb noxious smells, which was later invented by Alexander Cumming. Many toilet manufacturers have had the name John as part of the company's title, and there is dispute over whether the current American term "john" has any connection with Harington as its inventor.

In 1596, Harington, under the pseudonym Misacmos, wrote a book called A New Discourse upon a Stale Subject: The Metamorphosis of Ajax about his invention. The book made political allusions to the Earl of Leicester, which angered Elizabeth. It was a coded attack on the stercus or excrement that was poisoning society with torture and state-sponsored "libels" against his relatives Thomas Markham and Ralph Sheldon. After its publication, he was again banished from the court. Elizabeth's mixed feelings for him may have been the only thing that saved Harington from being tried at the Star Chamber.

=== Campaigns in Ireland ===
In 1599, Elizabeth sent an army led by Robert Devereux, 2nd Earl of Essex, to Ireland during the Nine Years War (1594–1603), to subdue a major rebellion by the Gaelic chieftains, led by Hugh O'Neill, Earl of Tyrone. After her strong recommendation that Essex include him in his army, Harington was put in command of horsemen under Henry Wriothesley, 3rd Earl of Southampton. Harington's legacy from this campaign was his letters and journal, which served to give Elizabeth good intelligence about the progress of the campaign and its politics. Harington wrote: "I have informed myself reasonably well of the whole state of the country, by observation and conference: so I count the knowledge I have gotten here worth more than half the three hundred pounds this journey hath cost me." During the campaign, Essex conferred a knighthood on Harington for his services. Essex fell into disfavour with Elizabeth for concluding the campaign by making a truce with Tyrone, which amounted to a virtual capitulation to the Irish rebels – she snapped at Essex: "If I had meant to abandon Ireland, it had been superfluous to send you there" – and for the large number of knighthoods he awarded.

Harington, present at the truce negotiations, accompanied Essex back to court to account to Elizabeth, but met with royal wrath: "Tell my witty godson to get him home ... it is no season to fool it here!" However, his wit and charm soon secured forgiveness: despite his closeness to Essex, he survived his downfall with his own reputation more or less unsullied. During what proved to be the Queen's last Christmas, he tried to lighten her mounting moods of melancholy by reading from his comic verses. Elizabeth thanked him, but said sadly, "When thou dost feel creeping time at thy gate, these fooleries will please thee less – I am past my relish for such matters".

== Courtier under James I ==
After the Queen's death, Harington's fortunes faltered at the court of the new King, James I. He had stood surety for his cousin Sir Griffin Markham's debts of £4000, when Markham had become involved in the Bye and Main Plots. Not able to meet his cousin's debts without selling his own lands, and unwilling to languish in gaol, he escaped from custody in October 1603. However, James I had already recognised his loyalty and granted him the properties forfeited on Markham's exile.

He claimed to be unhappy at James's court, owing specifically to the heavy drinking by both sexes, but in fact, he seems to have derived amusement from the antics of the courtiers. He left a description of a disastrous attempt by Sir Robert Cecil to stage a masque at Theobalds in honour of a visit by the King's brother-in-law, Christian IV of Denmark, in 1606, when some of the players were too drunk to stand up: "The entertainment and show went forward, and most of the presenters went backward, or fell down, wine did so occupy their upper chambers."

Towards the end of his life, Harington tutored Henry Frederick, Prince of Wales. He annotated for him a copy of Francis Godwin's De praesulibus Angliae ("Of the rulers of England"). Harington's grandson, John Chetwind, published these annotations in 1653 under the title A Briefe View of the State of the Church. While tutoring the Prince, Harington also translated from Italian to English verse Regimen sanitatis Salernitanum ("Health regimen of the School of Salernum"), a medieval collection of health tips. The translation was published in 1607 in London.

Harington fell ill in May 1612 and died on 20 November 1612 at the age of 52, soon after Henry Frederick, who had died on 6 November. He was buried in Kelston.

== In popular culture ==
John A. Stormer used part of Harington's epigram as the title for his 1964 anti-communist book None Dare Call It Treason.

In the television series South Park, Harington appears as a ghost in the episode "Reverse Cowgirl". He explains how to use his invention, the toilet, properly.

== Sources ==
- Grimble, Ian (1957). The Harington Family. Jonathon Cape, London.
- Kilroy, Gerard. Edmund Campion: Memory and Transcription, 2005. Archived from the original on 28 September 2011.
- Kinghorn, Jonathan (1986). "A Privvie in Perfection: Sir John Harrington's Water Closet". Bath History. 1: 173–188. ISBN 0-86299-294-X
- Thomas Park, ed., Nugae Antiquae by Sir John Harington, Knt, 3 vols, London (1804)
- Scott-Warren, Jason (2004–2007), "Harington, Sir John (bap. 1560, d. 1612)", Oxford Dictionary of National Biography, Oxford: Oxford University Press
