= George Christy =

American minstrel performer (1827-1868)

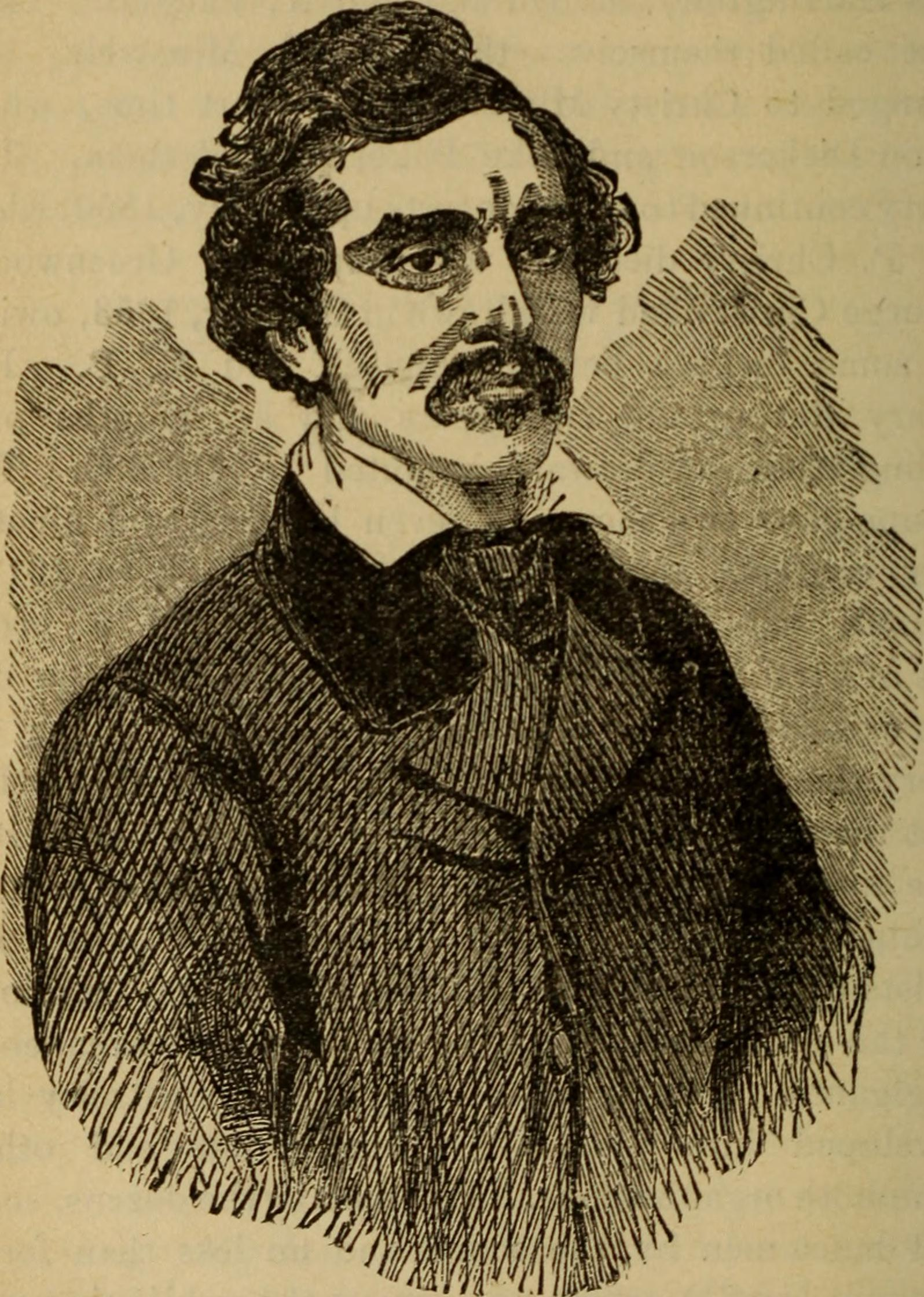
- Born: November 6, 1827; Palmyra
- Died: May 12, 1868; New York
- Occupation: Actor

George N. Christy (born George Harrington, November 6, 1827 – May 12, 1868) was one of the leading blackface performers during the early years of the blackface minstrel show in the 1840s.

== Biography ==
Born in Palmyra, New York, his career began as a star performer with his stepfather Edwin Pearce Christy's troupe Christy's Minstrels; in two and a half years with them he earned $19,680, a fortune for those times.

Jim Comer credits him with inventing "the line", the structured grouping that constituted the first act of the standardized 3-act minstrel show, with the interlocutor in the middle and "Mr. Tambo" and "Mr. Bones" on the ends.

He died in New York City from cerebral edema in 1868.

== Sources ==
- The National cyclopaedia of American biography, Volume 7
