= Richard Harington =

English academic

The Rev. Richard Harington (5 May 1800 – 13 December 1853) was an Oxford college head in the 19th century.

He was born in Hanover Square, Westminster and educated at Brasenose College, Oxford. A mathematician, he was Principal of Brasenose from 1842 until his death.

A son was Sir Richard Harington, 11th Baronet.

== Notes ==
Academic offices
Preceded by Ashurst Gilbert	Principal of Brasenose College, Oxford; 1842–1853	Succeeded by Edward Hartopp Cradock
