= Joe Harrington (baseball) =

American baseball player (1869–1933)

- Infielder
- Born: December 21, 1869; Fall River, Massachusetts, U.S.
- Died: September 13, 1933 (aged 63); Fall River, Massachusetts, U.S.
- Batted: Right Threw: Right

MLB debut
- September 10, 1895, for the Boston Beaneaters

Last MLB appearance
- July 20, 1896, for the Boston Beaneaters

MLB statistics
- Batting average: .220
- Home runs: 3
- Runs batted in: 38
- Stats at Baseball Reference

Teams
- Boston Beaneaters (1895–1896)

Joseph C. Harrington (December 21, 1869 in Fall River, Massachusetts – September 13, 1933) was an American professional baseball third baseman. He played in Major League Baseball from 1895–1896 for the Boston Beaneaters. He became the fourth major league ballplayer to hit a home run in his first at bat.

== See also ==
- List of Major League Baseball players with a home run in their first major league at bat

== Sources ==
- Career statistics from Baseball Reference · Baseball Reference (Minors) · Retrosheet · Baseball Almanac
