= John Herbert Harington =

British orientalist, colonial administrator and judge

John Herbert Harington (12 March 1765 – 9 April 1828) was a British orientalist, colonial administrator and judge. He published a two-volume edition of the Arabic and Persian works of Saadi Shirazi.

== Career ==
Harington was born on 12 March 1765, the son of John Harington D.D. (died 1795), prebendary of Salisbury, and his wife Rachel Hawes; Henry Hawes Harington (1770–c.1832) the Madras banker was a brother. He entered the service of the East India Company at Calcutta as a writer on 1 August 1780.

In 1781 he was appointed assistant in the revenue department, revenue Persian translator in 1783, puisne judge of the Dewanny Adawlut, and magistrate of Dinajpore on 1 May 1793; sub-secretary to the secret department, and examiner and reporter to the Sudder Dewanny Adawlut on 6 December 1793; registrar of the Sudder Dewanny and Nizamut Adawlut on 15 Feb. 1796; fourth member of the board of revenue on 3 June 1799; puisne judge of the Sudder Dewanny and Nizamut Adawlut on 1 April 1801; and chief judge of the Sudder Dewanny and Nizamut Adawlut on 17 December 1811.

He returned to England on furlough in 1819, and went back to India in 1822, when he was chosen provisionally member of the supreme council (21 Dec.), was appointed senior member of the board of revenue for the western provinces, and agent to the governor-general at Delhi on 1 Aug. 1823; was senior member of the Sudda special commission in the following October; and was chosen a member of the supreme council and president of the board of trade on 22 April 1825. Harington was president of The Asiatic Society from 1825 to 1828. He had been secretary in 1790.

Harington was also for some years honorary professor of the laws and regulations of the British government in India in the college of Fort William, founded by the Marquis Wellesley in 1800, and was afterwards president of the council of the college.

== Death ==
Harington returned to England in 1828, and died in London on 9 April of that year.

== Selected publications ==
- The Persian and Arabic works of Sa'dee, Calcutta, 1791–1795, 2 vols., fol.
- An Elementary Analysis of the Laws and Regulations enacted by the Governor-General in Council at Fort William in Bengal for the Civil Government of the British Territories under that Presidency, Calcutta, 1805–17, 3 vols. fol. (A volume of 'Extracts' from this work appeared at Calcutta in 1866)

== Family ==
Harington married Amelia Johnston in 1808. They had five children, including the physician Henry Harington (died 1850), and the Rev. Hastings Hawes Harington (fifth son, died 1862). Thomas Cudbert Harington (1798–1863), public servant in Australia, was a son of John Herbert Harrington, born out of wedlock, and, it is suggested, with an Indian mother.

== See also ==
- List of presidents of The Asiatic Society
