= George P. Harrington =

American politician

George P. Harrington (born 1850) was a member of the Wisconsin State Assembly.

== Biography ==
Harrington was born on March 20, 1850, in Cedarburg, Wisconsin. He attended the University of Wisconsin-Madison and the University of Wisconsin Law School before moving to Milwaukee, Wisconsin, in 1876.

== Career ==
Harrington was elected to the Assembly in 1882. Previously, he was Court Commissioner of Milwaukee County, Wisconsin, from 1877 to 1882.
