= Edward Charles Harington =

English churchman and writer

Edward Charles Harington (1804–1881) was an English churchman and writer.

== Life ==
He was the only son of the Rev. Edward Harington by his wife, Frances, daughter of John Boote of Fifield House, Oxfordshire; Sir Edward Harington was his grandfather. He appears to have been educated privately, and entered Worcester College, Oxford, on 6 July 1824, aged 19, where he graduated B.A. in 1828, and M.A. in 1833.

Taking orders (deacon 1828, priest 1829), Harington became incumbent of St David's Church, Exeter, and with the support of Bishop Henry Phillpotts of Exeter, was made a prebendary of Exeter Cathedral in 1845, and in 1847 chancellor of the church. He resigned his incumbency, and concentrated on diocesan work, especially education. He managed consensus in establishing the Diocesan Training College, taught there, and contributed to its endowments. In 1856 he became a canon residentiary of Exeter, spending no less than £15,000 on the repairs of the fabric, and £1,000 in providing seats in the nave. He also acted as subdean.

Harington was shy and considered somewhat eccentric, residing at first with his sisters and then alone. He attended the turning of the first sod of every new railway in England, and collected a good library. On 4 July 1881 he was attacked by apoplexy while attending a meeting at the Exeter Guildhall for the Society for the Prevention of Cruelty to Animals, and died on the 14th of the month. He was buried with his Haringtom ancestors at Kelston.

== Legacy ==
Harington left money to the poor of Kelston parish, and bequeathed his library to the dean and chapter of Exeter Cathedral, with £2,000 for a librarian. He left legacies to church institutions and to poor dependents.

== Works ==
Harington wrote:

- Brief Notes on the Church of Scotland from 1555 to 1842, Exeter, 1843.
- The Importance and Antiquity of the Rite of Consecration of Churches, with copious Notes and Forms, London, 1844.
- Two Sermons on Apostolical Succession, and Necessity of Episcopal Ordination, Exeter, 1845.
- The Succession of Bishops unbroken, and the Nag's Head Fable refuted. In reply to Rev. J. Spencer Northcote, London, 1846.
- The Reformers of the Anglican Church and Mr. Macaulay, London, 1849.
- The Reconsecration and Reconciliation of Churches, London, 1850.
- The Bull of Pius IX and the Ancient British Church, London, 1850.
- A Letter, &c., on the LV Canon and the Kirk of Scotland, London, 1851.
- A Reply to W. Goode's Reply to Archdeacon Churton and Chancellor Harington on LV Canon, London, 1852.
- A Sermon on the Purity of the Church of England and the Corruptions of the Church of Rome (Acts xxiv. 14), with copious Notes, London, 1852.
- Rome's Pretensions tested. A Sermon on Jerem. vi. 16, with copious Notes, Exeter, 1855.
- Pope Pius IV and the Book of Common Prayer, Exeter, 1856.
- Bradford the Martyr and Sir John Harington, reprint from Notes and Queries, Exeter, 1856.

== Notes ==
Attribution

This article incorporates text from a publication now in the public domain: Stephen, Leslie; Lee, Sidney, eds. (1890). "Harington, Edward Charles". Dictionary of National Biography. Vol. 24. London: Smith, Elder & Co.
