= Sir Richard Harington, 12th Baronet =

British barrister and judge

Sir Richard Harington, 12th Baronet, JP, DL (3 March 1861 – 1 February 1931) was a British barrister and judge.

Harington was the eldest son of Sir Richard Harington, 11th Baronet, a Metropolitan Police Magistrate and County Court judge. He was educated at Eton and Christ Church, Oxford. Called to the Bar in 1886, he practised as a barrister on the Oxford Circuit before taking up an appointment as a puisne judge in the High Court of Judicature at Fort William in 1899, where he served in that capacity until returning home in 1913.

He had, meanwhile, served in the London Brigade of the Royal Naval Artillery Volunteers from 1880 to 1891, and had commanded the Artillery Company of the Calcutta Port Defence Volunteers from 1900 to 1909. He volunteered for the Royal Naval Volunteer Reserve on the outbreak of the First World War in 1914, aged 53. He was promoted to the rank of Chief Petty Officer in the Anti-Aircraft Corps, in which capacity he served until 1916.

A onetime Justice of the Peace and Deputy Lieutenant for Herefordshire, he was appointed High Sheriff of Herefordshire in 1918 and died in February 1931, having succeeded to his father's title in 1911.

Harington married the Hon. Selina Louisa Grace, daughter of Charles Saunders Dundas, 6th Viscount Melville, in 1899. He was succeeded by their elder son, Richard Dundas Harington, who became the 13th Baronet.

== See also ==
- Harington baronets
