= Sir Richard Harington, 11th Baronet =

Sir Richard Harington, 11th Baronet, JP, DL (20 May 1835 – 6 February 1911) was a British barrister and judge.

== Biography ==
Harington was the eldest son of the Rev. Richard Harington, DD, Principal of Brasenose College, Oxford, and Cecilia, daughter of Very Rev. Samuel Smith, DD, Dean of Christ Church, Oxford. He was educated at Eton and Christ Church, Oxford, where he won the Slade Scholarship in 1853. He gained second-class honours in Classics in 1856 and first-class honours in Law and Modern History in 1857. He was the Vinerian Law Scholar for 1858.

Called to the Bar in 1858, he was appointed Police Magistrate of Hammersmith and Wandsworth in November 1871. He was a Judge of the County Courts from 1872 to 1905. A deputy lieutenant and justice of the peace, he was chairman of the Herefordshire Quarter Sessions and County Alderman.

In 1877, he succeeded to the family baronetcy from his first cousin Sir John Edward Harington, 10th Baronet.

Harington married in 1860 Frances Agnata, daughter of the Rev. Robert Biscoe, prebendary of Hereford and rector of Whitbourne, Herefordshire; they had five sons and two daughters. He died on 6 February 1911 and was succeeded to the baronetcy by his eldest son, Sir Richard Harington, 12th Baronet, also a barrister and judge. His second and fourth sons Charles and Robert Harington were clergymen; his third son Edward was a County Court judge (a son of his eldest son, John Charles Dundas Harington, was also a County Court judge, making the family one of the two to have produced three County Court judges); while his fifth son John was a brigadier-general in the British Army. A daughter, Margaret Agnata, was married to George Hume Pollock, son of Baron Pollock.

== See also ==
- Harington baronets
