= Bardsea =

Village in Cumbria, England

Coordinates: 54.162°N 3.073°W

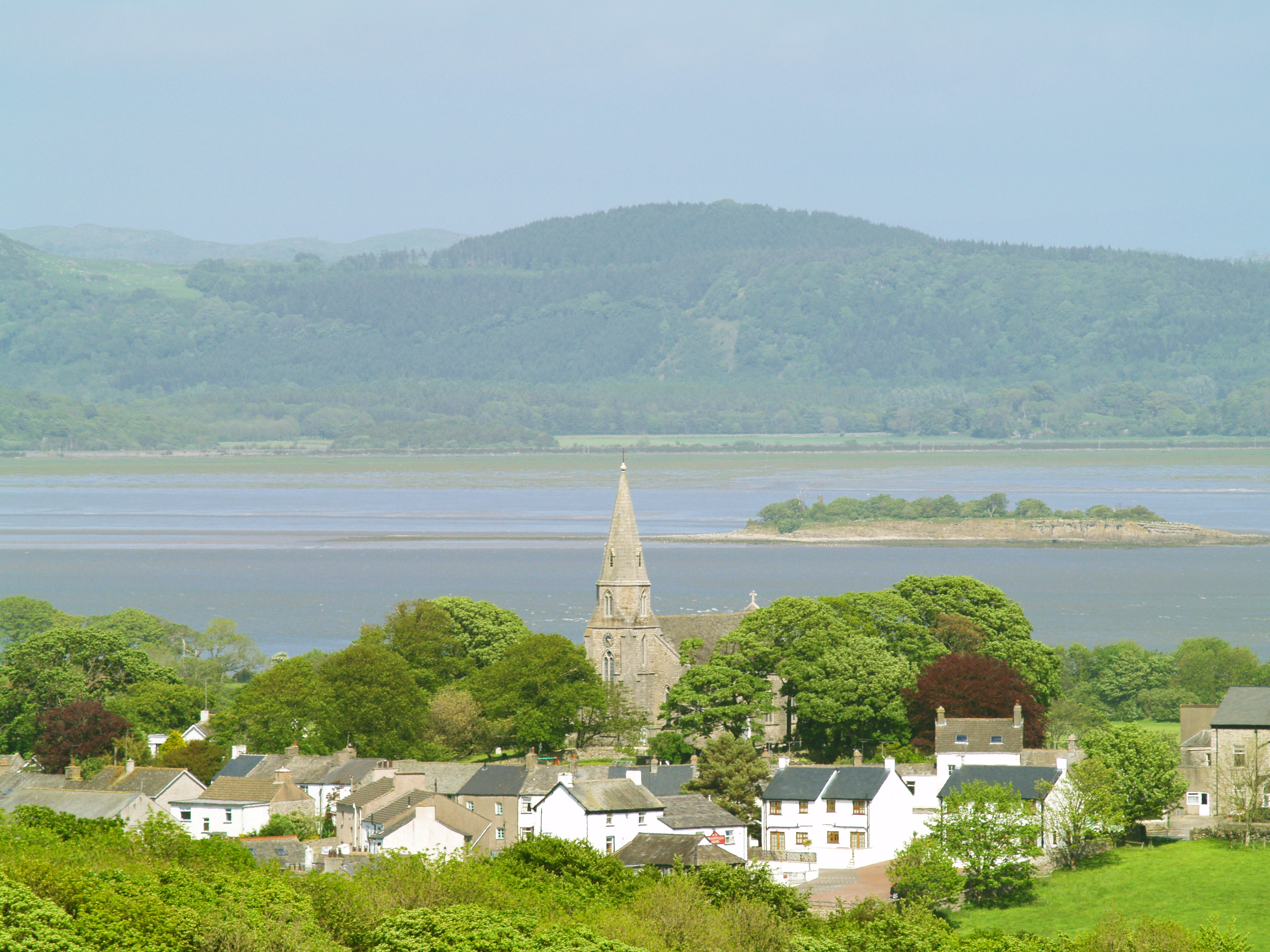
- Bardsea Village with Chapel Island

- Location in South Lakeland Location on Morecambe Bay Location within Cumbria
- OS grid reference: SD303732
- Civil parish: Urswick
- Unitary authority: Westmorland and Furness
- Ceremonial county: Cumbria
- Region: North West
- Country: England
- Sovereign state: United Kingdom
- Post town: ULVERSTON
- Postcode district: LA12
- Dialling code: 01229
- Police: Cumbria
- Fire: Cumbria
- Ambulance: North West
- UK Parliament: Barrow and Furness

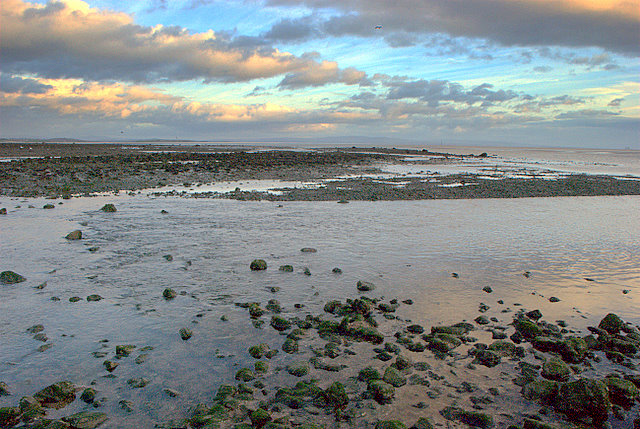
Cowp Scar Mussel Bed, near to Bardsea, Cumbria

Bardsea is a village in the Low Furness area of Cumbria, England. It is two miles to the south-east of Ulverston on the northern coast of Morecambe Bay. It is in the historic county of Lancashire.

== History ==
Bardsea, or Berretseige, is mentioned in the Domesday Book as one of the townships forming the Manor of Hougun held by Earl Tostig. Also once part of the medieval manor of Muchland.

Bardsea was once a small farming and fishing village well into the 19th century. It was accessed mainly by crossing the treacherous sands of Morecambe Bay. The church of Holy Trinity was consecrated in 1853. Previously the area had been included within the parish of Urswick.

The area was also associated with the early Quaker movement. When founder George Fox married local landowner Margaret Fell, he took over Swarthmoor Hall and much of the land round Bardsea. There is an old Quaker burial ground nearby at Sunbrick on Birkrigg Common, where Margaret Fell was reputedly buried in 1702 (one authority suggests she was interred at the burial ground at Swarthmoor, although that is contradicted by other sources). George Fox himself was buried in London.

When iron ore mining and production led to industrialisation in Furness, Bardsea became a significant port, with steamers leaving for Fleetwood and Liverpool. That was short-lived, however, with the Furness Railway and Ulverston Canal taking business away from the village by the end of the Victorian period.

A branch line from Plumpton Junction, on the main railway to Barrow, which opened in 1883, was supposed to run to Bardsea and beyond, but the rails never got closer than Conishead Priory, about 1 mile (1.6 km) to the north. The line closed in 1917.

== Community ==
Bardsea currently has one used public house; the Ship Inn which was a farm in 1750. Bardsea also has a converted Malt Kiln, dated 1829 and once part of the Well Wood estate, which is now used as a village hall. The Hartley family bought the hall and set up a trust deed in memory of local men who were killed in the war, handing over the malt Kiln to the community.

== Geography ==
Nearby locations of interest are the common with prehistoric Birkrigg stone circle, Sea Wood which once belonged to Lady Jane Grey, the Manjushri Centre at Conishead Priory and Chapel Island used as a sanctuary when crossing the sands.

When stood at the top of Birkrigg Common, it is possible to see the Sir John Barrow Monument and Morecambe Bay, as well as other local landmarks and the town of Ulverston.
