= Isabel Yeamans =

English Quaker preacher (c. 1637–1704)

Personal details
- Born: c. 1637 Swarthmoor Hall
- Died: 1704 Lincoln, England
- Spouse(s): William Yeamans (m. 1664-died 1674); Abraham Morrice (m. 1689-1704; her death)
- Children: 4

Isabel Yeamans (née Fell, later Morrice; c. 1637 – 1704) was an English Quaker preacher, and daughter of Margaret Fell and step-daughter of George Fox, co-founders of the Religious Society of Friends.

== Life ==
Isabel was the third of eight children born to Thomas Fell, a judge and member of Parliament, and Margaret Askew Fell. She was born at Swarthmoor Hall near Ulverston, Lancashire, most likely in 1637, but possibly as late as 1642.

In 1652, George Fox visited Swarthmoor Hall for the first time as a traveling minister. Over the course of his stay, Isabel, her mother Margaret, her sister Sarah Fell, and many of the family became convinced members of the Quaker faith. Thomas Fell happened to be away during this first visit; he became tolerant of their new views, but did not convert himself. He died in 1658. Margaret Fell and several of her daughters continued to manage the estate, and Swarthmoor Hall became a center of Quaker activity.

Isabel married William Yeamans, a Quaker and merchant of Bristol, in 1664. They had four children: William, who died in infancy, Margaret and Rachel, who both died during childhood, and a second son William, the only one who lived to adulthood. The marriage of Margaret Fell and George Fox was held at the Yeamans’ home in Bristol in 1669. Isabel signed their marriage certificate.

After death of her husband William in 1674, Isabel moved back to Swarthmoor Hall with her two children Rachel and William. Sometime in the early 1680s she agreed to marry Francis Rogers, a Quaker of Cork, but he withdrew his proposal in 1684 citing concerns about Yeamans’ financial situation. Isabel was married a second time in 1689 to Abraham Morrice, a Quaker and merchant of Lincoln. She maintained close relationships with family, including her sisters and her mother, throughout her life. She died in 1704.

== Career ==
Convinced to Quakerism in 1652, by 1660 Isabel was traveling widely and preaching at meetings throughout England and Scotland, as well as writing to meetings in the North and in Ireland. In Bristol she continued the work of Fox and Margaret Fell calling for women's rights in Quaker meetings, including working to establish separate women's meetings for business, which supported women's service, voices, and roles in the Quaker circles. Isabel was known as a gifted speaker and skilled minister.

Isabel sometimes served as a representative of and support for Fox in his travels and work with other Friends. One notable trip was to the Netherlands and Germany in 1677. Isabel joined Fox, William Penn, Robert Barclay, and George Keith and his wife Elizabeth to visit Quaker communities there and to convert others. Isabel hand delivered a letter written by Fox to the Princess Elizabeth of the Palatinate, and spoke with her. Princess Elizabeth expressed admiration for how Isabel expressed herself.
