= James Cranke =

English painter

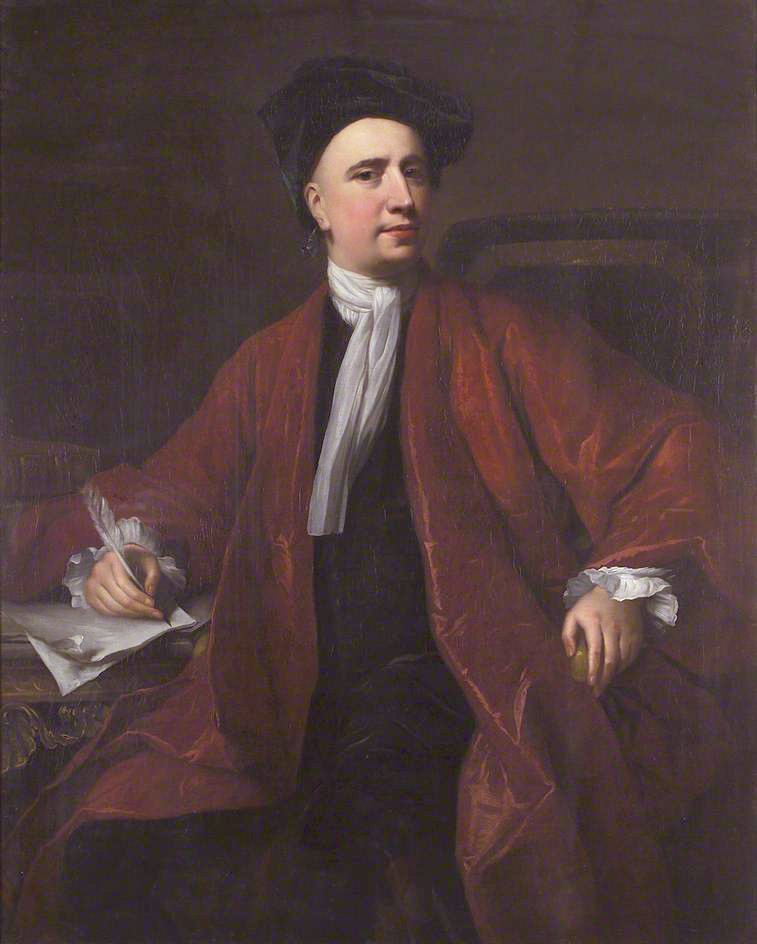
- Self portrait (c. 1751)
- Born: James Cranke; 23 June 1707; Little Urswick, Lancashire, England
- Died: 28 October 1780 (aged 73); Little Urswick, Lancashire, England
- Known for: Painting
- Notable work: Portrait of Miss Parker, Portrait of Miss Newnham, sister of Lady Ryder, Portrait of Catherine Fleming, Lady Leicester

James Cranke (/kræŋk/; June 23, 1707 – October 28, 1780) was an English painter.

== Biography ==
Born at Little Urswick, near Barrow-in-Furness, he lived there for most of his life. He was trained as a plasterer, but became a self-taught portrait painter and attempted to make his name in London c. 1737–52. He attended St. Martin's Lane Academy and in 1744 he married a well-known heiress and opened his own studio in Bloomsbury Square. Several art historians have recognised that he may have been more prolific had ill health not forced him to return home. His chosen medium was oil on canvas.

Portrait of Miss Parker wearing a white dress and blue cloak

James Cranke taught the well-known artist George Romney (1734–1802) how to paint when he was a small boy. Romney was born at Beckside, Dalton-in-Furness, which was close to the home of the Cranke Family. James Cranke taught one of his sons, James Cranke Jr (1746–1826), to follow him as a portrait painter.

The success of James Cranke and his son as portrait painters helped their family to become important local landowners. Steelworks In 1854 the Furness Railway persuaded their descendants to sell their rural estate at Hindpool, and this enabled the development of Barrow as a town to begin in earnest.

James Cranke is also notable as the father of the mathematician John Cranke. An altar painting of the Last Supper by Cranke can be seen at St Mary and St Michael's Church, Great Urswick.
