= William Caton =

English Quaker itinerant preacher and writer (1636–1665)

William Caton (1636–1665) was an early English Quaker itinerant preacher and writer.

== Life ==
He was probably a near relation of Margaret Fell. At the age of fourteen he was taken by his father to Swarthmoor, near Ulverston, to be educated by a kinsman who was then tutor to the Fell family; the boy was then sent to a school at Hawkshead. In 1652 George Fox paid his first visit to Swarthmoor Hall, and Caton embraced quakerism. He now refused to study on the ground of its being a worldly occupation, and Margaret Fell employed him at Swarthmore to teach her younger children and act as her secretary.

When he was about eighteen, Caton was chosen one of the quaker preachers for the district, and in his Journal he relates that he was often met with violence by the people of the places in which he attempted to preach. In 1654 he left Swarthmore in order to become an itinerant preacher. Towards the end of the year he was joined by John Stubbs, with whom he proceeded to Maidstone. Here they were both sent to the house of correction and harshly treated, but the only charge against them was preaching, and the magistrates released them. About the middle of 1655 Caton went to Calais, preaching through an interpreter, and returned to England. After a preaching tour, which lasted some months, he went to the Dutch Republic, hoping to convert the Dutch. At Vlissingen and Middelburg he found English congregations, and was roughly handled at both places for interrupting their services. At the end of 1655 he was again in England. He next made an attempt to promulgate quakerism in Scotland, and was the messenger from the Friends in England to General George Monck. Early in 1656 Caton was imprisoned for a short time at Congleton. Towards the end of this year he returned to the Dutch Republic, and decided to settle in Amsterdam, where there was a small Quaker community. He spent some time between England and the Dutch Republic.

At the end of 1660 he had an interview with Charles I Louis, Elector Palatine at Heidelberg, to plead for liberty of conscience. About 1662 he married Annekin Derrix or Derricks, a Dutch quakeress. On a later journey to the Dutch Republic he was forced to take shelter in Yarmouth Roads, where he landed, and was imprisoned for nearly five months for refusing the oath of allegiance. He returned to the Dutch Republic. His last known letter is dated 8th month 1665 (O.S.), and Barclay, in his reprint of Caton's ‘Journal,’ states that there is reason to believe that he died towards the end of 1665.

== Works ==
He wrote both in English and Dutch, and his style was more simple and pointed than that of most of the seventeenth-century Friends. In England, the Dutch Republic, and Germany his works were for more than a century highly esteemed.

His principal works were:

- ‘A True Declaration of the Bloody Proceedings of the Men of Maidstone,’ 1655.
- ‘The Moderate Enquirer resolved … by way of Conference concerning the condemned People commonly called Quakers,’ &c., 1659 (translated into Dutch as ‘Den matelijcken Ondersoeker voldaen’ in 1669).
- ‘Truth's Character of Professors …’ 1660.
- ‘An Epistle to King Charles II sent from Amsterdam in Holland, the 28 of the 10 month, 1660.’
- ‘William Caton's Salutation and Advice unto God's Elect,’ 1660.
- ‘An Abridgement; or a Compendious Commemoration of the Remarkable Chronologies which are contained in that famous Ecclesiastical History of Eusebius Pamphilus,’ 1661 (reprinted as ‘An Abridgement of Eusebius Pamphilius's Ecclesiastical History’).
- ‘The Testimony of a Cloud of Witnesses,’ &c., 1662.
- ‘Two General Epistles given forth in Yarmouth Common Gaol,’ 1663.
- ‘A Journal of the Life of … Will. Caton, written by his own hand’ (edited by George Fox), 1689.

Besides the above Caton wrote a large number of small books and tracts in High and Low Dutch, including ‘Eine Beschirmung d'un schuldigen,’ 1664.
