= Sarah Fell =

English Quaker accountant and writer (1642–1714)

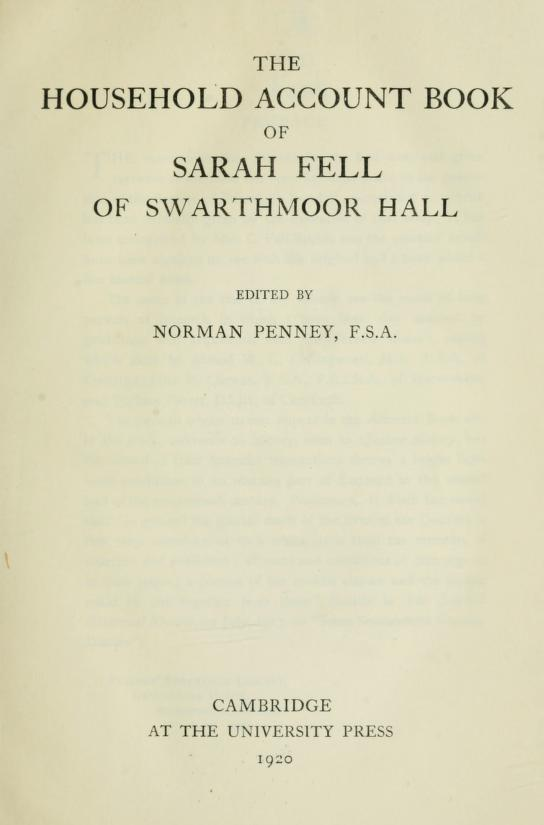
The household account book of Sarah Fell, of Swarthmore hall by Fell, Sarah, Penney, Norman, 1858–1933

Sarah Fell (1642–1714) was an English Quaker accountant and writer at Swarthmore Hall. She was the daughter of Margaret Fell and Thomas Fell, and the eventual stepdaughter of George Fox.

== Personal ==
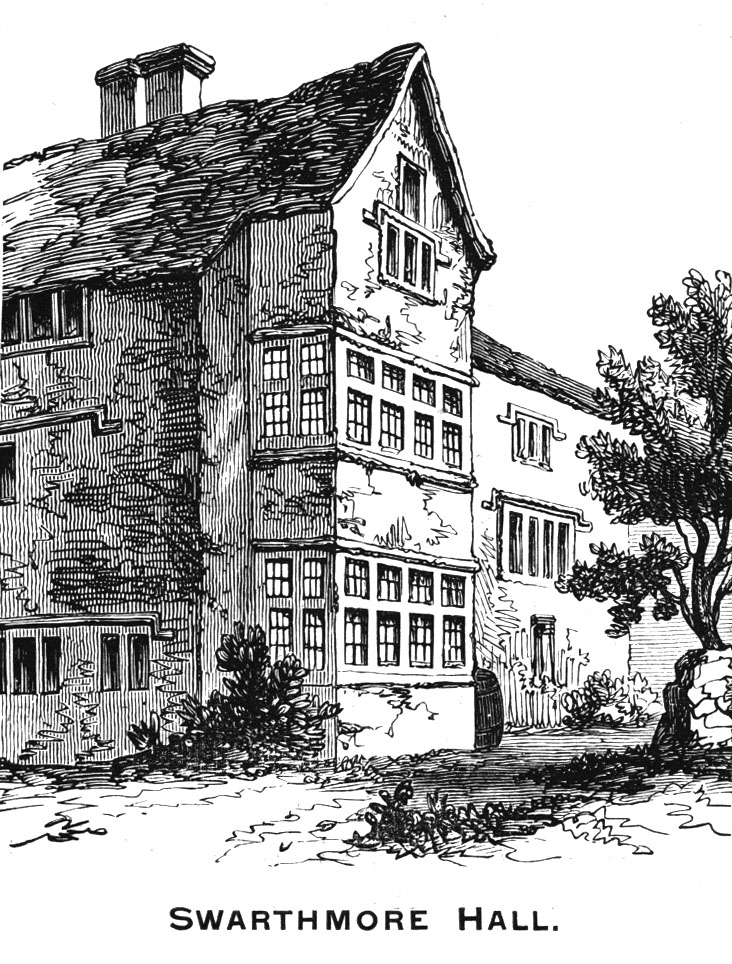
Swarthmore Hall

Sarah Fell or Sarah Meade was born in 1642 in Lancashire, England in Swarthmore Hall. She was the fourth daughter of Judge Thomas Fell and Margaret Fell, who was also known as the "Mother of Quakerism." She was subsequently the stepdaughter of George Fox, whom Margaret Fell remarried after Thomas Fell's death in 1658. She was the sister of Margaret Rous, Bridget Fell, George Fell, Isabel Yeamans, Mary Lower, Susannah Ingram, and Rachel Abraham. She married William Meade in June 1681 and together they had a son, Nathaniel Meade.

== Career ==
Fell worked as a Swarthmore farm accountant and clerk of the Lancashire Women Quarterly Meeting. She wrote the household account book of Swarthmore Hall between 1672 and 1678. When the account book was first opened in March 1672, the residents of Swarthmore were Margaret Fell, George Fox, three unmarried daughters (Sarah, Susannah, and Rachel), a recently widowed daughter, Isabel, and Isabel's two children. Fell's account book showed the expenditures for her family and the Swarthmore Minutes (SWMM), which reflected the Quaker philanthropic thoughts and practices. In this century, women were very much involved in their husbands' business affairs; as a result, account books kept by women also had detailed information of their husbands' income. The names of 198 women who had social or business relationships with Fells appeared at least once in her account book during the six years she recorded. One third of that total appeared in the Swarthmore Minutes. Women who were not mentioned in the Minutes were likely silent or poor members of the Meeting. The book also included the death and funeral information of Sarah Fell's niece Rachel Yeamans, who died as a child on 20 June 1676 while visiting Swarthmore Hall. From 1658 to 1681, Sarah invested in iron bloomery with her mother and three sisters, recording the income of iron bloomery in her account book, albeit not completely. Between 1664 and 1668, Sarah took charge of the farm while her mother Margaret was imprisoned in Lancaster Castle. She also founded the town bank and grammar school in Ulverston and helped the poor. She became a banker to her Quaker neighbors and friends, offering financial operations included loans, receipts, and payments.

== Charity ==
In 1676, Sarah loaned money to several of her laborers and servants at the Swarthmore. She was known to be a fair lender, and also gave money to those who could not repay her. People who borrowed from the Fell's family always repaid the debts.

== Quakerism ==
She was involved in the administration part of Swarthmoor Hall Quaker Women Quarterly Meeting. She also wrote the epistle directed to Quaker women's meetings everywhere. Her father was not a Quaker, but he allowed her mother and her followers to use Swarthmoor Hall for meetings nonetheless. The Sarah Fell room at Friends House, London, UK is named after her.

== Death ==
Fell died on 9 June 1714 in Gooseyes, Essex, England.
