= Listed buildings in Urswick =

Urswick is a civil parish in Westmorland and Furness, Cumbria, England. It contains eleven listed buildings that are recorded in the National Heritage List for England. Of these, one is listed at Grade I, the highest of the three grades, and the others are at Grade II, the lowest grade. The parish contains the villages of Great Urswick, Little Urswick, Bardsea, and Stainton with Adgarley, and is otherwise rural. The listed buildings consist of houses, two churches, a monument and a sundial in a churchyard, and a monument on a hilltop,

== Key ==
Grade	Criteria
I	Buildings of exceptional interest, sometimes considered to be internationally important
II	Buildings of national importance and special interest

== Buildings ==
Name and location	Photograph	Date	Notes	Grade
St Mary and St Michael's Church; 54.15826°N 3.12178°W		13th century	The oldest parts of the church are the lower part of the tower and the chancel. The nave and vestry date from the 14th century, when the chancel was also lengthened. The church is built in stone with a slate roof, and consists of a nave, a south porch, a chancel, a north vestry, and a west tower. The tower has a west doorway with a pointed head, and a three-light Perpendicular window, above which is a niche containing a statue of a Pietà, and at the summit is a coped embattled parapet. Most windows in the body of the church are in Decorated style. Inside the church is a west gallery added in 1828.	I
Mid Town House; 54.16293°N 3.12063°W	—	1638	A roughcast stone house with a slate roof, two storeys and four bays. The first bay projects forward, it is gabled, and contains a French window. The other windows vary in type, and include one mullioned window. Above the doorway is an embattled lintel with the date and an initial. In front of it is a lattice porch with a cornice and a lion.	II
Redmayne Hall and outbuilding 54.15188°N 3.13095°W	—	17th century (probable)	The farmhouse and outbuilding are in stone with slate roofs, and the house is roughcast. The house has two storeys, four bays, and at the rear is a two-storey outshut and a gabled wing. On the front is a gabled porch with a round-headed opening, a gablet above the first bay, and a bay window with a cornice. The other windows are of varying types. The outbuilding to the left has two entrances and a loading door, and in the angle is a small outbuilding.	II
Stainton Old Hall and adjoining house 54.14194°N 3.15478°W	—	1657	Originally one house, later divided into two dwellings, it is in roughcast stone with slate roofs. There are two storeys with attics, and two bays, the second bay projecting with a gable, and a rear wing with an outshut. In the first bay is a doorway with a fanlight, an embattled and dated lintel, and a hood mould. On the west front is a porch and another dated lintel. The windows are of varying types.	II
Well Head House; 54.15211°N 3.13013°W	—	1658	Originally one house, later divided into two, it has an L-shaped plan. There are two storeys with an attic, and a southeast front of four bays. On the front is a lean-to porch, and above the door is a dated and initialled lintel. The windows are of varying types, including some that are mullioned, and there are also dormer windows.	II
Sundial; 54.15807°N 3.12155°W	—	1729	The sundial is in the churchyard of St Mary and St Michael's Church. It is in ashlar stone, and consists of a four-step base, a square pier, a round plate, and a gnomon. Inscribed on the pier are numbers and initials.	II
Well House and Cottage; 54.15837°N 3.07640°W	—	18th century	Two stone houses with slate roofs. Well House has a south front of three storeys and three bays, and a small two-storey wing to the west with a tiled roof. There is a central doorway, the windows in the ground floor date from the 20th century and have segmental heads, and those in the upper floors are sashes. At the rear is a two-storey three-bay wing, and there is another wing forming Well Cottage, which has sash windows and a tiled roof.	II
Bardsea Monument; 54.16720°N 3.07771°W		1792	The monument to members of the Gale family stands on a hilltop. It is in limestone with some brick, and consists of a triangular structure with diagonal buttresses on a square base. It has a corbelled parapet with flat coping and finials, and a cupola with a lantern. In each face is a round-headed niche containing an urn, and on the base is an inscription.	II
Gale Monument; 54.15797°N 3.12189°W	—	Early 19th century	The monument is in the churchyard of St Mary and St Michael's Church, and commemorates members of the Gale family. It is in ashlar stone and stands in an enclosure with a low wall and railings. The monument consists of a square sarcophagus with an urn finial on a square plinth.	II
Holy Trinity Church; 54.16196°N 3.07185°W		1843–53	The church was designed by George Webster, and is in limestone with a slate roof. It consists of a nave, a north vestry, a south porch, a chancel with a canted apse, and a west steeple. The steeple has a square tower with angle buttresses, a west window, an octagonal bell stage, and an octagonal spire with lucarnes. Around the apse is a Lombard frieze.	II
Holme Bank Cottages; 54.15545°N 3.11782°W	—	Undated	A pair of roughcast stone houses with a slate roof, two storeys, five bays, and a rear outshut. On the front is a gabled porch between the first and second bays, and in the fourth bay is an doorway with a moulded surround and a dated and initialled lintel. The windows vary, and include mullioned windows, casement windows, and sash windows.	II
