= Urswick School =

Urswick School may refer to:

- The Urswick School, a secondary school in Hackney, London, England
- Urswick Grammar School, a defunct school in Little Urswick, Cumbria, England
