= Willem Sewel =

Dutch Quaker historian of English background (1653–1720)

Willem Sewel (also William) (19 April 1653 (baptised) – March 1720) was a Dutch Quaker historian, of English background.

== Life ==
He was son of Jacob Williamson Sewel, a free citizen and surgeon of Amsterdam where he was born. His paternal grandfather, William Sewel, a Brownist of Kidderminster, emigrated from England to escape religious persecution, and married a native of Utrecht. His mother, Judith Zinspenning, daughter of a German Catholic, afterwards a Baptist, joined the Quakers in 1657, after hearing William Ames. She became an eloquent minister, visited England in 1663, was author of A Serious Reproof to the Flemish Baptists, 1660, a Book of Proverbs (translated into English by William Caton, London, 1663), An Epistle, and other short books. She died at Amsterdam on 10 September 1664, aged 34. Her husband predeceased her.

Sewel was brought up by an uncle. At eight he was fairly proficient in Latin, but was soon apprenticed to a weaver. At fourteen he visited his mother's friends in England. Returning to Holland after a sojourn of ten months, he obtained work as a translator, contributed regularly to the Amsterdam Courant and other papers, wrote verses, and conducted a periodical. In spite of an invitation from William Penn to become master of the Quaker school opened at Bristol, Sewel remained in Amsterdam until his death on 13 March 1720. He was married, with a family.

== Works ==
Sewel spent 25 years on his major work, The History of the Rise, Increase, and Progress of the Christian People called Quakers. It was first published in Dutch, as Histori van de Opkompste, Aanwas en Voortgang der Christenen bekend by den naam van Quakers, Amsterdam, 1717 (another edition, 1742). The English edition (London, 1722), dedicated to George I, was largely undertaken to correct Historia Quakeriana (Amsterdam, 1695; English translation, London, 1696, by Gerard Croese, to whom Sewel had given letters and narratives from England). Sewel's own work was based on a mass of correspondence, George Fox's Journal, and, for the public history, Lord Clarendon's Rebellion and Edmund Ludlow's Memoirs. It became an authority.

Sewel's other works are:

- A Large Dictionary of English-Dutch, 2 pts. Amsterdam, 1691; 5th ed. 1754; 6th, 1766.
- A Compendious Guide to the Low Dutch Language (English and Dutch), Amsterdam, 1700; other editions, 1725, 1740, 1747, 1760–86.

These two works were reprinted together, 1708. It was reissued in edited form by S. H. Wilcocke, London, 1798.

- Oratio in Luxum (Latin and Dutch), 1715.

Sewel edited the Grammaire Hollandoise of Philippe la Grue, 1744, 3rd ed. 1763, 4th, 1785, and translated the following into Dutch from the English:

- Robert Boyle, Disquisition about the final causes of Natural Things, 1688;
- William Penn, No Cross, no Crown, 1687, and his Good Advice to the Church of England;
- Gilbert Burnet, Short History of the Reformation of the Church of England, 1690;
- Steven Crisp, Way to the Kingdom of Heaven, 1695;
- William Dampier, New Voyage round the World, The Hague, 1698–1700 (Leyden, 1707, 1737); and
- the shipwreck account God's Protecting Providence, Philadelphia, 1699 (2nd edit. London, 1700; 7th edit. 1790), of Jonathan Dickinson (d. 1722).

From the Latin:

- Basil Kennett, Romæ Antiquæ Notitia, published in François Desseine's Beschryving van Oud en Niew Rome, 1704; and
- the works of Josephus, 1722.

From French:

- David Martin, Histoire du Vieux et du Nouveau Testament, 1700;

and from the German:

- Gottfried Arnold, Wahre Abbildung der ersten Christen, 1700; another edition, 1703.

He also translated into Dutch Matthew Prior's Ode on King William's Arrival in Holland, 1695.
