= Rosside =

Village in Cumbria, England

Coordinates: 54.198°N 3.118°W

- Location in South Lakeland Location within Cumbria
- Population: 43 (2001)
- OS grid reference: SD 27155 78640
- Civil parish: Ulverston
- Unitary authority: Westmorland and Furness
- Ceremonial county: Cumbria
- Region: North West
- Country: England
- Sovereign state: United Kingdom
- Post town: ROSSIDE
- Postcode district: LA12
- Dialling code: 01229
- Police: Cumbria
- Fire: Cumbria
- Ambulance: North West
- UK Parliament: Barrow and Furness

Rosside is a small village in Cumbria, England, on the outskirts of Ulverston. The village consists of around 15 houses, all contained in an area of around 600 square metres (6,500 sq ft). Rosside is part of the Ulverston parish, as are the neighbouring villages of Pennington, Swarthmoor and Loppergarth.

== Geography ==
Rosside is loosely split into two areas, 'Little' (La'al) Rosside and 'Great' Rosside. These two groups of buildings are split by the stream running through the village, which is fed by the Barton reservoir at the Spade Forge.

== Places of interest ==
A local landmark is Rosside Dam. Built to power the water wheel of the Lancashire Spade Company forge.

Rosside has a few historical buildings to be noted:

- Rosside House, built in 1729 and its adjoining coach house
- The old iron forge with its rustic watermill and waterfalls
- The Telephone Box, which is an original 1953 edition Location of the Cow Ear music video Telephone Box.
