= St Mary and St Michael's Church, Great Urswick =

Coordinates: 54.1583°N 3.1218°W

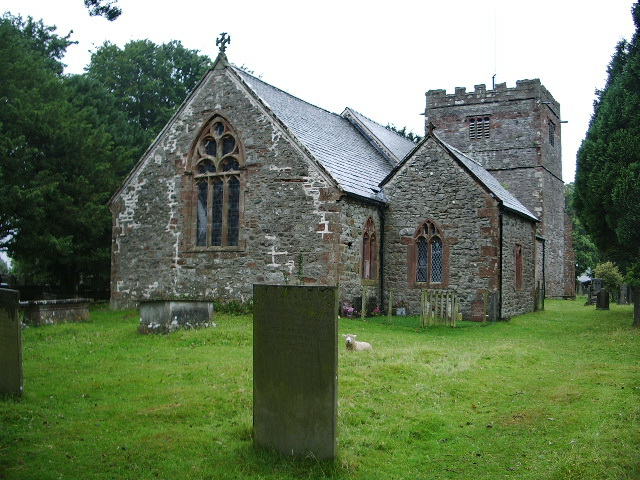
- St Mary and St Michael's Church, Great Urswick, from the east

- Location in Cumbria
- OS grid reference: SD 268 742
- Location: Great Urswick, Cumbria
- Country: England
- Denomination: Anglican
- Website: St Mary and St Michael, Urswick

History
- Status: Parish church

Architecture
- Functional status: Active
- Heritage designation: Grade I
- Designated: 25 March 1970
- Architectural type: Church
- Style: Gothic

Specifications
- Materials: Stone, slate roof

Administration
- Province: York
- Diocese: Carlisle
- Archdeaconry: Westmorland and Furness
- Deanery: Furness
- Parish: Urswick

Clergy
- Priest: Revd Alex Armstrong

St Mary and St Michael's Church is in the village of Great Urswick, Cumbria, England. It is an active Anglican parish church in the deanery of Furness, the archdeaconry of Westmorland and Furness, and the diocese of Carlisle. Its benefice is united with those of St Cuthbert, Aldingham, St Matthew, Dendron, and St Michael, Rampside. These churches are part of a group known as the Low Furness Group of Parishes. The church is recorded in the National Heritage List for England as a designated Grade I listed building.

== History ==
There is evidence that a church existed on the site before the Norman conquest, but the earliest parts of the present church are found in the lower part of the tower and in the chancel and date from the 13th century. The chancel was lengthened in the 14th century, and the nave and north vestry date from this period. The tower was also heightened around this time, and the interior of the roof is dated 1598. A west gallery was installed in 1828. Plaster was stripped from the internal walls in 1911. In 2011 the church was restored, and a new heating system installed.

== Architecture ==
=== Exterior ===
The church is constructed in stone rubble with ashlar dressings and a slate roof. Its plan consists of a four-bay nave with a south porch, a chancel with a north vestry, and a west tower. The tower is as wide as the nave, and has a west doorway with a pointed arch. Above the doorway is a three-light window with Perpendicular tracery and a niche containing a sculpture of the Pietà. The three-light bell openings have louvres and straight heads. At the top of the tower is an embattled parapet. The walls of the tower are very thick, and contain a stairway inside the north wall. On the south side of the nave is a gabled porch with a round-headed doorway, over which is a quatrefoil. To the right of the porch are two-light Decorated windows, and a two-light mullioned window. On the north side are two-light straight-headed windows. The east window of the chancel has three lights. On the south side of the chancel are a lancet window, and a two-light Decorated window, and on the north side is a two-light Perpendicular window. The vestry has two-light windows on the east and west sides.

=== Interior ===
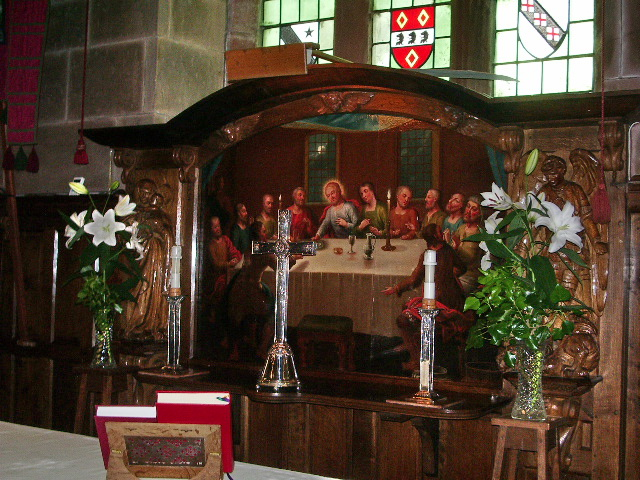
The Last Supper. Altar piece by James Cranke.

Inside the church is a west gallery carried on pairs of Doric columns. Many of the fittings were carved by Alec Miller in the 1910s. The choir stalls and the organ case are carved with angels playing a variety of instruments. On the vestry door is a carving of the Annunciation. The rood screen has depictions of saints, and carries a plain cross. The reredos includes a painting by James Cranke, and is flanked by carved figures of Virgin Mary and Saint Michael. The three-decker pulpit dates from the 18th century, and has a tester of 1912, which consists of a scallop carried by putti. The pews are decorated with roses and scallops. A larger pew, known as the Gale Pew, has carvings of putti and flowers. The font is medieval, and is in the shape of a large egg-cup. Its cover dates from 1921, and is carved with various items linked to the sea. Two of the windows on the south side of the chancel contain fragments of medieval stained glass. In the south wall of the nave is a window known as the Maiden's window, which was made in 1912–13, and a window of 1931 depicting Doubting Thomas, made by Powells. Also in the church is a 13th-century coffin lid inscribed with a foliated cross, and memorial wall tablets dating from the 18th and 19th centuries. The two-manual pipe organ is located on the north side of the chancel, and was built by Wilkinson of Kendal in about 1910. There is a ring of six bells, the oldest of which dates from about 1460. The next was cast in 1711 by Abraham Rudhall II of Gloucester. The other bells were both cast by John Taylor and Company of Loughborough, one in 1907. and the other in 1955.Two further bells have been added, The Four Sisters and The Centenary Bell both cast by John Taylor & Co.

=== Carved stones ===
When the plaster was stripped from the internal walls in 1911, an ancient carved stone was found incorporated in the wall. It is known as the Tunwinni Cross, and is carved with a panel containing runes, below which are two figures. The stone was dated by the antiquarian W. G. Collingwood to the 9th century. In 1909 another stone had been found, this one being a fragment of the cross-shaft dating possibly from the 10th century.

== External features ==
In the churchyard are two structures that are listed at Grade II. To the south of the church is a monument to the Gale family with dates between 1816 and 1903. It consists of a sarcophagus with an urn finial, in a square enclosure surrounded by railings. Nearer the church is a sundial dated 1729. This consists of an inscribed square pier on a four-stepped base, with a round plate and gnomon.

== See also ==
- Grade I listed churches in Cumbria
- Listed buildings in Urswick
