= Harry Christian =

Recipient of the Victoria Cross

- Born: 17 January 1892; Pennington, Lancashire
- Died: 2 September 1974 (aged 82); West Cumberland Hospital, Whitehaven
- Burial place: Egremont Cemetery
- Military career
- Allegiance: United Kingdom
- Branch: British Army
- Service years: 1910 - 1919
- Rank: Private
- Units: King's Own Royal Regiment (Lancaster)
- Conflicts: World War I
- Awards: Victoria Cross

Harry Christian VC (17 January 1892 – 2 September 1974) was an English recipient of the Victoria Cross, the highest and most prestigious award for gallantry in the face of the enemy that can be awarded to members of the British and Commonwealth armed forces.

== Details ==
Christian was 23 years old, and a private in the 2nd Battalion, King's Own Royal Regiment (Lancaster), British Army during the First World War when the following deed took place at Cuinchy, France, for which he was awarded the VC.

The citation, published in the London Gazette on 3 March 1916, read:

“For most conspicuous bravery. He was holding a crater with five or six men in front of our trenches. The enemy commenced a very heavy bombardment of the position with; heavy "minenwerfer" bombs, forcing a temporary withdrawal.

When he found that three men were missing, Private Christian at once returned alone to the crater, and, although bombs were continually bursting actually on the edge of the crater, he found, dug out, and carried one by one into safety all three men, thereby undoubtedly saving their lives.

Later he placed himself where he could see the bombs coming, and directed his comrades when and where to seek cover.”

== The Medal ==
His Victoria Cross is displayed at The King's Own Royal (Lancaster) Regiment Museum in Lancaster, England.

== Bibliography ==
- Batchelor, Peter; Matson, Christopher (2011). The Western Front 1915. VCs of the First World War. The History Press. ISBN 978-0-7524-6057-4.
- Oldfield, Paul (2015). Victoria Crosses on the Western Front, April 1915–June 1916. Pen and Sword Books. ISBN 978-1783030439.
- Whitworth, Alan (2015). VCs of the North: Cumbria, Durham & Northumberland. Pen and Sword Books. ISBN 978-1473848221.
