= Friends House =

Quaker meeting house in London, England

Coordinates: 51.5263°N 0.1326°W

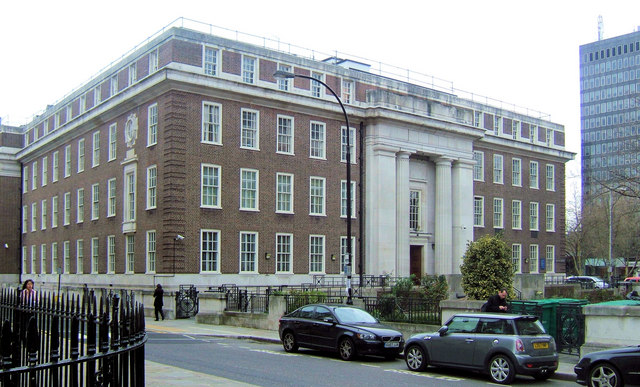
Friends House

Friends House is a multi-use building at 173 Euston Road in London, England. The building houses the central offices of British Quakers and a conference centre. The building is also the principal venue for North West London Meeting and the Britain Yearly Meeting.

Friends House serves as a hub for an array of events, meetings, conferences, and gatherings for organisations and individuals. There is also a library (the Library of the Society of Friends), a café, a bookshop, a worship space, a courtyard, and garden on-site.

== Background ==
Prior to 1926, the central offices of British Quakers were located in Devonshire House on Bishopsgate in the City of London. The Society of Friends had been renting rooms there since 1666, prior to which it had been the London home of the Dukes of Devonshire. Over time the Quakers obtained the lease of the building and adjoining ground and erected purpose-built meeting houses and offices. By 1911, the site was no longer of sufficient size for the number of employees that worked there and a committee was set up to consider rebuilding or moving

After a spirited debate among Quakers, it was agreed to sell the Devonshire House site and look for new premises. They purchased the freehold of Endsleigh Gardens for £45,000 in 1923. The choice of Endsleigh Gardens was quite controversial, as it was a greenfield site, and the building of Friends House was criticised by The London Society.

== The building ==
After the new site had been purchased, five Quaker architects were invited to submit outline plans for the new facility. The specifications included a large meeting house capable of seating 1,500 people for Yearly Meeting, a smaller meeting house, office space and a library with strong rooms.

The winning design was created by Hubert Lidbetter, who presented a simple and elegant neo-Georgian design of Portland stone and brick. It consisted of three distinct blocks, each with its own entrance. The eastern section, with the garden entrance, was designed for administration, the central block with the colonnaded entrance on Euston Road contained the large and small meeting spaces, and the west block, with its entrance on Gordon Street, was created for letting out. This western section is now known as Drayton House.

The completed building won the RIBA Bronze medal in 1927 for the best building erected in London that year. It was described in the Architectural Review as "eminently Quakerly … [it] unites common sense with just so much relief from absolute plainness as gives pleasure to the eye". It was Grade II-listed in May 1996.

=== The large meeting house/The Light auditorium ===
In 2014, the large meeting house was refurbished by John McAslan + Partners, becoming The Light, a 1,000-delegate capacity auditorium. A 200-square-meter floor space and a skylight were created. In an echo of Hubert Lidbetter’s 1927 RIBA bronze medal, The Light won a RIBA Regional award in 2015. It continues to be the primary venue for Britain Yearly Meeting.

=== Garden ===
The Friends House garden links Euston Road and Endsleigh Gardens, through a path that is open from the early morning to the late afternoon. In 2016, the garden was relandscaped, following a design by Quaker horticulturist Wendy Price and John Mc Aslan + Partners inspired by the Waldo Williams poem "In Two Fields".

A pathway was added, carved with a timeline of more than twenty key Quaker dates “highlighting significant points through three centuries, from persecution to permission to worship and marry; and commitment to tackle issues around slavery, landmines, mental health, justice, sexuality and sustainability”.

=== Meeting rooms ===
Within Friends House are numerous meeting rooms and conference halls of varying sizes. All the meeting rooms are named after prominent Quakers and peace campaigners, including Bayard Rustin, Lucretia Mott, John Woolman, Ada Salter, Waldo Williams, George Bradshaw, Kathleen Lonsdale, Abraham Darby, Hilda Clark, Marjorie Sykes, Margaret Fell, Sarah Fell, Benjamin Lay, Elizabeth Fry and George Fox.

=== The Library ===
Friends House is home to the Library of the Society of Friends. This collection dates from the 1650s, and includes the records and archives of Britain Yearly Meeting as well as one of the largest collections of Quaker books and material in the world. Highlights of the collection include the diaries of Elizabeth Fry, the anti-slavery pamphlet collection and the Swarthmore manuscripts: over 1400 letters of the first Quakers.

== Notable events at Friends House ==
=== Visit of Mahatma Gandhi ===
Mahatma Gandhi visited the UK in 1931 for the Round Table Conferences discussing constitutional reforms in India. He made his first public speech in London in the large meeting house in Friends House.

=== Housewives cost-of-living protest ===
Hundreds of women gathered at Friends House on 23 February 1938 to speak about how the cost of living had affected them. Several women spoke, including a young housewife who said: "We do not ask for strawberries and cream, we only ask for bread and butter." A petition of over 500,000 women’s signatures protesting against the government’s handling of the crisis was handed to Clement Attlee, then leader of the opposition.

=== Visit of Norman Manley ===
Norman Manley, Prime Minister of Jamaica, spoke at a gathering at Friends House in the wake of the Notting Hill riots in 1958. Manley told the large crowd, many of whom were people of African-Caribbean heritage that he was “here to let you know that you have governments that care for you, to challenge decent British public opinion to stamp out things that would shame even a Southern State in the United States of America”.

=== International Conference for Sanctions against South Africa ===
The first international conference on sanctions against South Africa was called by the Anti-Apartheid Movement in April 1964. It was chaired by Mongi Slim and attended by representatives from 29 different countries. Oliver Tambo, at that time deputy president of the African National Congress (ANC), spoke about the racial injustice in South Africa, asking: "what is to be the end of the world's abhorrence of apartheid, if the world supports apartheid materially?"

=== Visit of Martin Luther King Jr. and Bayard Rustin ===
Martin Luther King Jr. was introduced at a lunch reception in Friends House by Bayard Rustin. The reception had been arranged by the Quaker Peace and Race Relations Committees, and was part of King’s visit to London ahead of his Nobel Prize ceremony.

=== Break-in by South African Intelligence Services ===
In December 1971, the offices of the Britain Yearly Meeting were broken into, allegedly by the South African Intelligence Services, and documents of the Friends Peace and International Relations Committee relating to their membership and work with South Africa were stolen

=== Stop the War Coalition ===
On 21 September 2001, more than 2,000 people gathered in Friends House to begin the organised opposition to the war on terror

=== Visit of Greta Thunberg ===
Quakers in Britain hosted a climate emergency event on 22 April 2019, where Greta Thunberg spoke, urging people to pay attention to climate change.
