= John Cranke =

English scientific thinker and clergyman

- Born: 1746
- Died: 6 September 1816
- Education: Trinity College, Cambridge
- Scientific career
- Fields: Mathematician
- Workplaces: Trinity College, Cambridge
- Notable students: Thomas Jones

Notes
- He is the son of the notable artist James Cranke.

John Cranke (/kræŋk/; 1746–1816) was an English scientific thinker and clergyman. Cranke was admitted as a sizar at the age of 21 into Trinity College, Cambridge on 1 July 1767, after graduating from Sedbergh School. His father was James Cranke, a notable artist who has an entry in Redgrave's Century of English Painters.

== Biography ==
At the University of Cambridge, John Cranke obtained a BA in 1771, an MA in 1774, and a BD (Bachelor of Divinity) in 1792. He became a Fellow of Trinity College in 1772. At Trinity he acted as a tutor in mathematics and is notable as the mentor of Thomas Jones. In 1774, he became the curate of the Chesterton parish, in Cambridgeshire, and the parish curate of Great St Mary's, Cambridge, 1784–1792. He was vicar of the Shudy Camps parish, Cambridgeshire, 1792–1798, then Vicar of Gainford, County Durham, during 1798–1816. He died on 6 September 1816.
