= Margaret Fell =

Quaker, founder of the Religious Society of Friends (1614–1702)

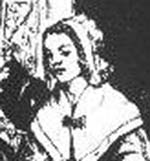
- Artist's impression, from a 20th-century etching
- Born: Margaret Askew; 1614; Kirkby Ireleth, Lancashire
- Died: 23 April 1702 (aged 87–88)
- Occupations: Theologian, writer
- Known for: Founder of the Religious Society of Friends
- Spouse(s): Thomas Fell (1632 – d. 1658), George Fox (1669 – d. 1691)
- Children: 8, including Isabel and Sarah

Margaret Fell or Margaret Fox (née Askew, formerly Fell; 1614 – 23 April 1702) was a founder and leading member of the Religious Society of Friends. Known popularly as the "mother of Quakerism," she is considered one of the Valiant Sixty early Quaker preachers and missionaries. Her daughters Isabel (Fell) Yeamans and Sarah Fell were also leading Quakers.

== Life ==
She was born Margaret Askew at the family seat of Marsh Grange in the parish of Kirkby Ireleth, Lancashire (now in Cumbria). She married Thomas Fell, a barrister, in 1632, and became the lady of Swarthmoor Hall. In 1641, Thomas became a Justice of the Peace for Lancashire, and in 1645 a member of the Long Parliament. He ceased to be a member from 1647 to 1649, disapproving of Oliver Cromwell's assumption of authority. Margaret and Thomas had seven daughters and one son; only Thomas and their son were not convinced to the Quaker faith perspective.

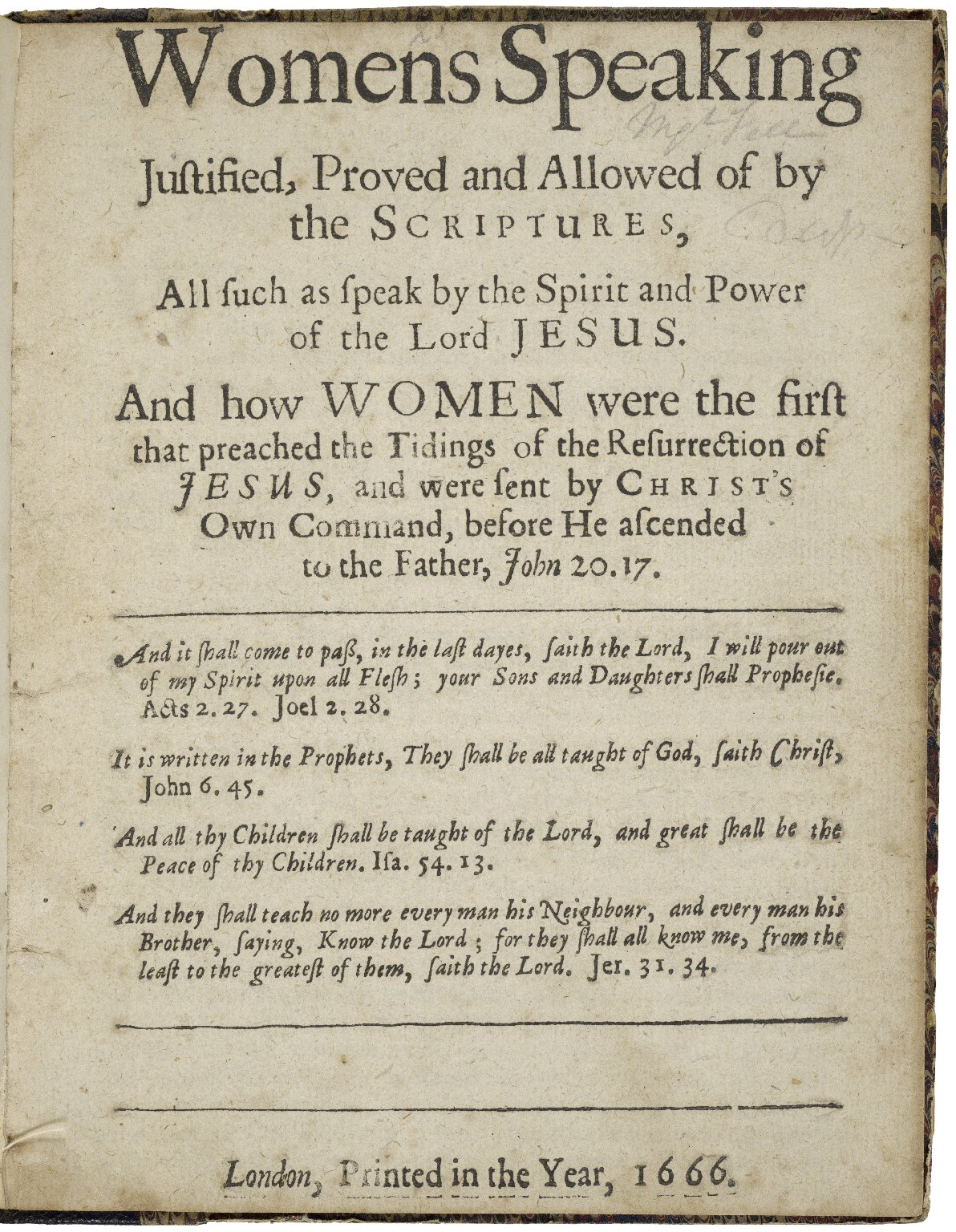
The title page of a 1666 edition of Fell's Womens Speaking Justified, in which she advocated for a woman's ability to preach.

In late June 1652, George Fox visited Swarthmoor Hall. Margaret Fell met him, and later wrote that he "opened us a book that we had never read in, nor indeed had never heard that it was our duty to read in it (to wit) the Light of Christ in our consciences, our minds never being turned towards it before." A day or two later it was lecture day at the parish church, she invited Fox to attend with them; he came in after the singing and asked for liberty to speak. Over the next weeks she and many of her household became convinced. Over the next six years, Swarthmoor Hall became a centre of Quaker activity; she served as an unofficial secretary for the new movement, receiving and forwarding letters from roving missionaries, and occasionally passing along admonitions to them from Fox, Richard Hubberthorne, James Nayler, and others. She wrote many epistles herself and collected and disbursed funds for those on missions. After her husband's death in 1658, she retained control of Swarthmoor Hall, which remained a meeting place and haven from persecution, though sometimes, in the 1660s, raided by government forces.

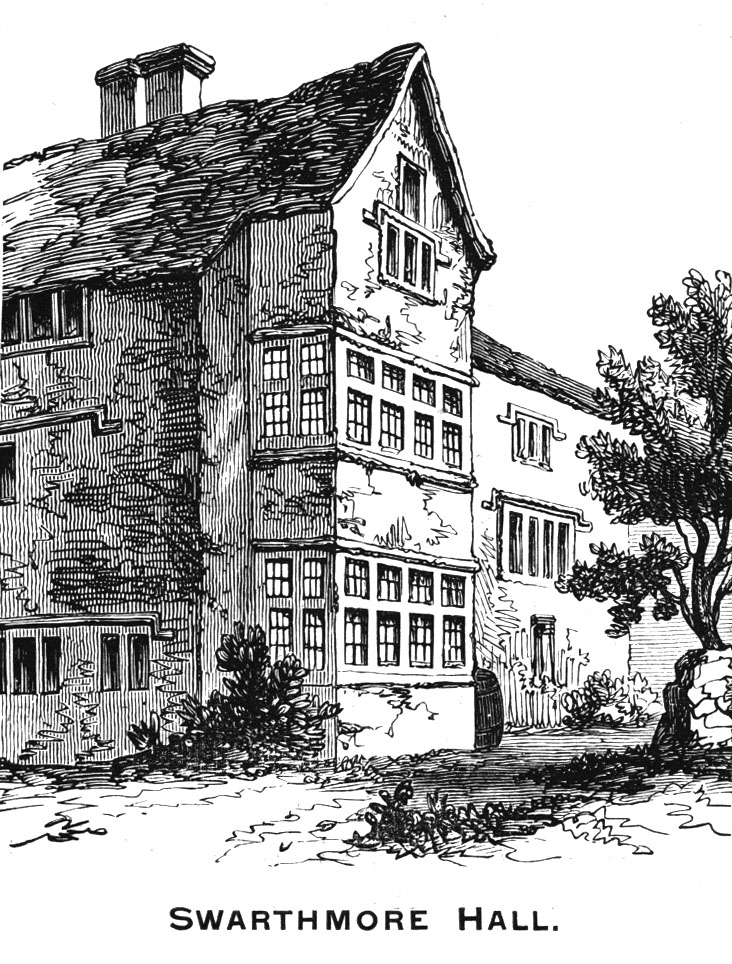

Because she was one of the few founding members of the Religious Society of Friends who was an established member of the gentry, Margaret Fell was frequently called upon to intercede in cases of persecution or arrest of leaders such as Fox. After the Stuart Restoration, she travelled from Lancashire to London to petition King Charles II and his parliament in 1660 and 1662 for freedom of conscience in religious matters. A submission signed by George Fox and other prominent (male) Quakers was made only subsequently in November 1660. While the structure and phraseology of these submissions were quite different, the import was similar, arguing that, although Friends wished to see the world changed, they would use persuasion rather than violence towards what they regarded as a "heavenly" (i.e. spiritual) end.

In 1664 Margaret Fell was arrested for failing to take an oath and for allowing Quaker Meetings to be held in her home. She defended herself by saying that "as long as the Lord blessed her with a home, she would worship him in it". She spent six months in Lancaster Gaol, whereafter she was sentenced to life imprisonment and forfeiture of her property. She remained in prison until 1668, during which time she wrote religious pamphlets and epistles. Perhaps her most famous work is "Women's Speaking Justified", a scripture-based argument for women's ministry, and one of the major texts on women's religious leadership in the 17th century. In this short pamphlet, Fell bases her argument for equality of the sexes on one of the basic premises of Quakerism, namely spiritual equality. Her belief was that God created all human beings, therefore both men and women were capable of not only possessing the Inner Light but also the ability to be a prophet.

Having been released by order of the King and council, she married George Fox in 1669. On returning to Lancashire after her marriage, she was again imprisoned for about a year in Lancaster for breaking the Conventicle Act. Shortly after her release, George Fox departed on a religious mission to America, and he too was imprisoned again on his return in 1673. Margaret again travelled to London to intercede on his behalf, and he was eventually freed in 1675. After this, they spent about a year together at Swarthmoor, collaborating on defending the recently created organisational structure of separate women's meetings for discipline against their anti-Fox opponents.

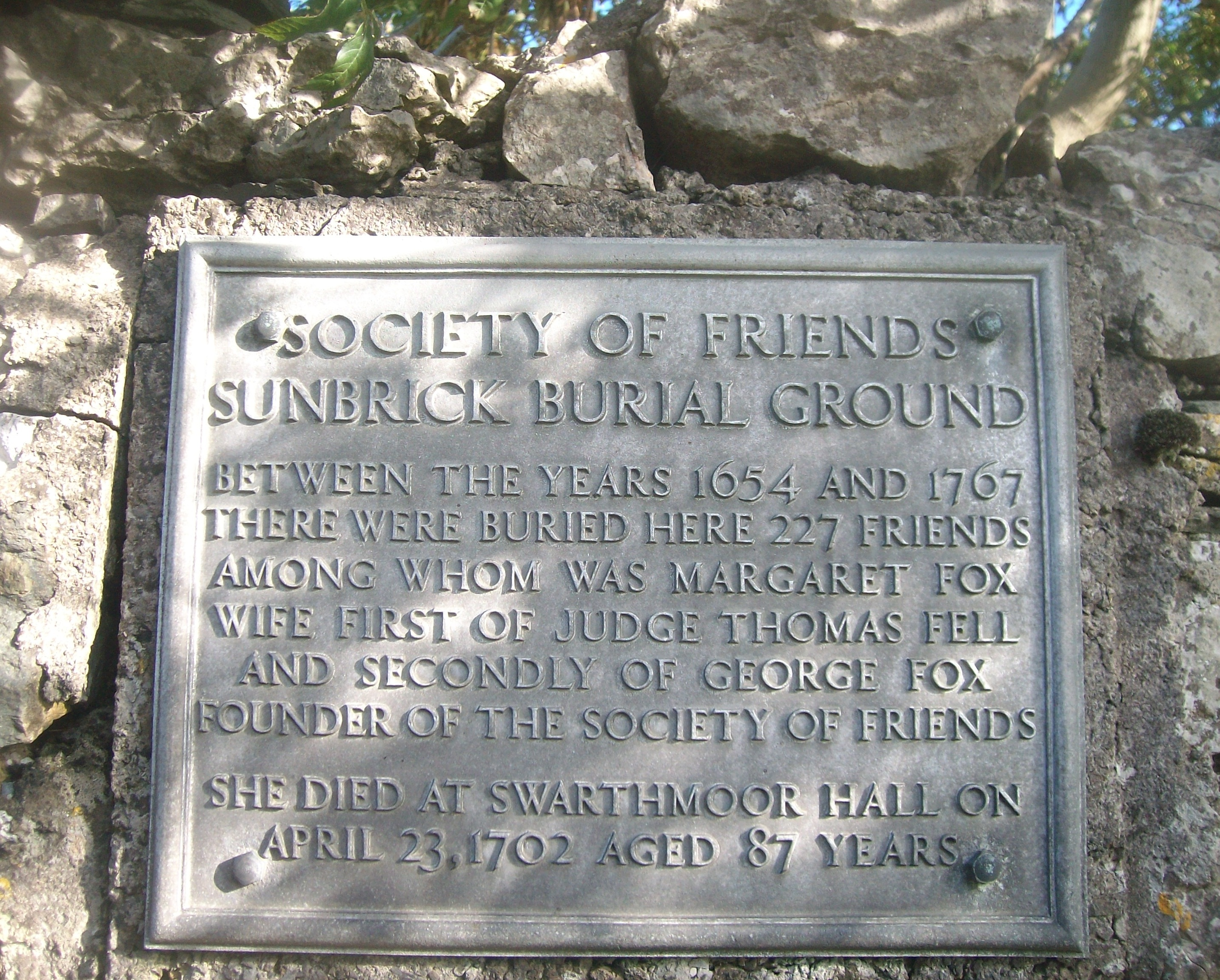
A plaque at the Society of Friends' burial ground in Sunbrick, Urswick, Margaret Fox's resting place

George Fox spent most of the rest of his life thereafter abroad or in London until his death in 1691, while Margaret Fell spent most of the rest of her life at Swarthmoor. Surviving both husbands by a number of years, she continued to take an active part in the affairs of the Society including the changes in the 1690s following partial legal tolerance of Quakers, when she was well into her eighties. In the last decade of her life, she firmly opposed the effort of her fellow believers in Lancashire to maintain certain traditional Quaker standards of conduct (for example, in matters of dress). She died aged 87, on 23 April 1702. She was buried in an unmarked grave in the Society of Friends' burial ground at Sunbrick, to the south of Birkrigg Common.

The Margaret Fell room at Friends House, London, UK is named after her. There is also a Margaret Fell Lecture Theatre at Lancaster University.

== In literature ==
Margaret Fell's meeting with George Fox and her subsequent conversion are the subject of the first part of the novel The Peaceable Kingdom by Jan de Hartog. She was the author (or co-author) of at least 23 works in total, mostly in the form of short pamphlets that she began publishing shortly after her conversion to Quakerism in 1655. Some of her more substantial works—including A Call to the Universall Seed of God (1665), Womens Speaking Justified (1666; second edition, 1667), and A Touch-Stone: or, A Perfect Tryal by the Scriptures (1667)—were written during the period of her imprisonment in Lancaster Castle (1664–68). Following her death, several of her works were collected together and published as A Brief Collection of Remarkable Passages and Occurrences (1710). Despite its 535 pages, this collection is nevertheless incomplete and includes only a small sample of letters. Her works are now available in their original form in online databases such as Early English Books Online, or in modern anthologies. Elsa F. Glines has published 164 of Fell’s surviving letters in her collection The Letters of Margaret Fell (2003).
