= Thomas Jones (mathematician) =

Welsh mathematician

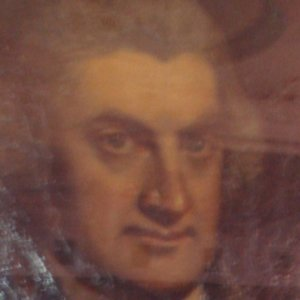
- Portrait of Thomas Jones (1756–1807) by D. Gardner
- Born: 23 June 1756; Berriew, Montgomeryshire, Wales
- Died: 18 July 1807 (aged 51); Edgware Road, London, England
- Education: St John's College, Cambridge; Trinity College, Cambridge
- Awards: First Smith's Prize
- Scientific career
- Fields: Mathematician
- Workplaces: Trinity College, Cambridge
- Academic advisors: John Cranke; Thomas Postlethwaite
- Notable students: John Hudson; Adam Sedgwick

Thomas Jones (23 June 1756 – 18 July 1807) was a Welsh mathematician who was Head Tutor at Trinity College, Cambridge, for twenty years and an outstanding teacher of mathematics. He is notable as a mentor of Adam Sedgwick.

== Biography ==
Jones was born at Berriew, Montgomeryshire, in Wales.

On completing his studies at Shrewsbury School, Jones was admitted to St John's College, Cambridge, on 28 May 1774, as a 'pensioner' (i.e. a fee-paying student, as opposed to a scholar or sizar). He was believed to be an illegitimate son of Mr Owen Owen, of Tyncoed, and his housekeeper, who afterwards married a Mr Jones, of Traffin, County Kerry, Thomas then being brought up as his son.

On 27 June 1776, Jones migrated from St John's College to Trinity College. He became a scholar in 1777 and obtained his BA in 1779, winning the First Smith's Prize and becoming Senior Wrangler. In 1782, he obtained his MA and became a Fellow of Trinity College in 1781. He became a Junior Dean, 1787–1789 and a Tutor, 1787–1807. He was ordained a deacon at the Peterborough parish on 18 June 1780. Then he was ordained priest, at the Ely parish on 6 June 1784, canon of Fen Ditton, Cambridgeshire, in 1784, and then canon of Swaffham Prior, also 1784. On 11 December 1791, he preached before the university, at Great St Mary's, a sermon against duelling (from Exodus XX. 13), which was prompted by a duel that had lately taken place near Newmarket between Henry Applewhaite and Richard Ryecroft, undergraduates of Pembroke, in which the latter was fatally wounded. Jones died on 18 July 1807, in lodgings in Edgware Road, London. He is buried in the cemetery of Dulwich College. A bust and a memorial tablet are in the ante-chapel of Trinity College.

His academic mentor was John Cranke (1746–1816). His Cambridge tutor was Thomas Postlethwaite.
