= Heaning Wood Bone Cave =

Cave in Cumbria, England

Coordinates: 54.1641°N 3.12398°W

Heaning Wood Bone Cave is a cave of archaeological importance in Great Urswick, Cumbria, England.

The cave was first excavated by Holland in 1958, when he found Bronze Age pottery, human and animal bones, and a stone-flake knife of Langdale stone.

In January 2023 it was reported that human bone and a periwinkle shell bead, found in the cave by local archaeologist Martin Stables, had been dated to 11,000 years ago, making it one of the earliest identified locations for human presence in the north of England. At least eight individuals had been buried in the cave, from the early Bronze Age (4,000 years ago), the early Neolithic period (6,000 years ago) and the early Mesolithic period (11,000 years ago).

In February 2026 it was announced that some of the bones had been identified as being from a female aged between two and a half and three and a half years. She had been given the name Ossick Lass, reflecting the local name for Urswick. She has been dated to between 9290 and 8925 BCE.
