= Thomas Fell =

English lawyer and politician (1598-1658)

Thomas Fell (1598 – 8 October 1658), was a lawyer, member of parliament and vice-chancellor of the Duchy of Lancaster.

== Early life and education ==
Fell was born at Hawkshead, near Ulverston. He was the son of George Fell, a gentleman of ancient Lancashire family. He was admitted to Gray's Inn in 1623, called to the bar in 1631, and practised successfully for several years.

In 1632, he married Margaret Fell, with whom he had eight children, and resided at Swarthmoor Hall, near Ulverston, his paternal property. In 1641, he was placed on the commission of the peace for Lancashire and named JP when some royalists were removed. In the following year (1642), he was appointed a parliamentary sequestrator for Lancashire.

=== Career ===
In 1645, he was elected to parliament for the city of Lancaster. In the following year, on the newly remoulded section of the local church, his name appears on the list of laymen for the presbytery of Furness. In 1648, Oliver Cromwell named him a commissioner for the safety of the county, and in 1649 he was nominated vice-chancellor of the duchy and attorney for the county palatine. From 1650 to 1651, he was chosen as bencher of Gray's Inn, and is recorded as being at that time a judge of assize for the Chester and North Wales circuit.

Fell was considered a leading puritan in the district of Furness, and practised hospitality with his wife's assistance. During his absence on circuit in 1652, the family was converted by George Fox. Fell hastened home and was met by Fox, who explained his doctrines. Although Fell never embraced Quakerism, he granted the use of Swarthmoor Hall for friends to meet in, and frequently sat in an adjoining room with the door open, so as to afford them the protection of his presence. His wife said, "He was very loving to Friends."

In 1652, he worked the northern circuit with President John Bradshaw. In 1653, along with other justices, he directed to prevent royalists landing or gathering in Cumberland or Lancashire, and at the end of that year he was, with Bradshaw, appointed a commissioner for reviving the duchy jurisdiction at Westminster. In 1654, he was appointed one of the commissioners for keeping the seal of the county of Lancaster.

From a letter written to him by Thomas Aldam in 1654, it appears that his favouritism toward Quakers made him unpopular. In 1655, however, he was directed to proceed to London to determine cases in the duchy court at Westminster. For several years before his death, Fell withdrew from parliamentary life, disapproving of the Protector's assumption of authority in civil and religious matters. Although Cromwell is believed to have made several overtures to him, he still declined to take any active part in the government.

== Personal ==
He died on 8 October 1658 in Swarthmoor, and was buried in Ulverston Church by torchlight. The record of his burial states that he was chancellor of the duchy of Lancaster.

He was survived by one son and seven daughters, one of whom, Sarah Fell, a Quaker minister, was noted not only for her beauty, but also for her eloquence and knowledge of Hebrew. She married one Mead. By his will, Fell founded the Town Bank Grammar School at Ulverston, and left other legacies to the poor. Margaret, his widow, married George Fox in 1669.

== Sources ==
This article incorporates text from a publication now in the public domain: "Fell, Thomas". Dictionary of National Biography. London: Smith, Elder & Co. 1885–1900.
