= Birkrigg =

Area of countryside in Cumbria, England

Coordinates: 54.159°N 3.098°W

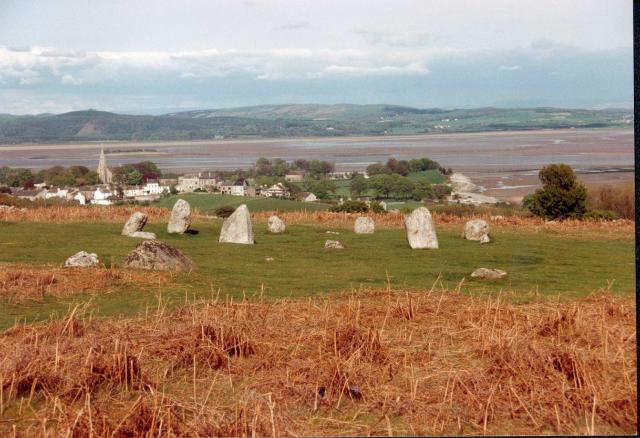
View from Birkrigg Common to Bardsea village and over the bay, with stone circle

Birkrigg or Birkrigg Common is an open-area of limestone countryside near the town of Ulverston on the Furness Peninsula in southern Cumbria, England. There is extensive limestone pavement on Birkrigg, which is protected under The Wildlife and Countryside Act 1981. Birkrigg's peak is at 136 metres (446 ft), but its position as the high point on the east of the Furness Peninsula affords it extensive views to the Lake District, Yorkshire Dales, Howgills and across Morecambe Bay to Blackpool.

Birkrigg has a long history of human inhabitation, and the common contains Birkrigg stone circle, a Bronze Age stone circle which is a scheduled monument. Other scheduled monuments on Birkrigg are three round cairns and a "prehistoric enclosed hut circle settlement, an associated enclosure, and a bowl barrow".

Birkrigg is land common to the parishes of Aldingham and Urswick, and has been in public ownership since the sixteenth century. Today, Birkrigg is a popular recreation site crossed by several footpaths and bridleways.
