= Birkrigg stone circle =

Archaeological site in Cumbria, England

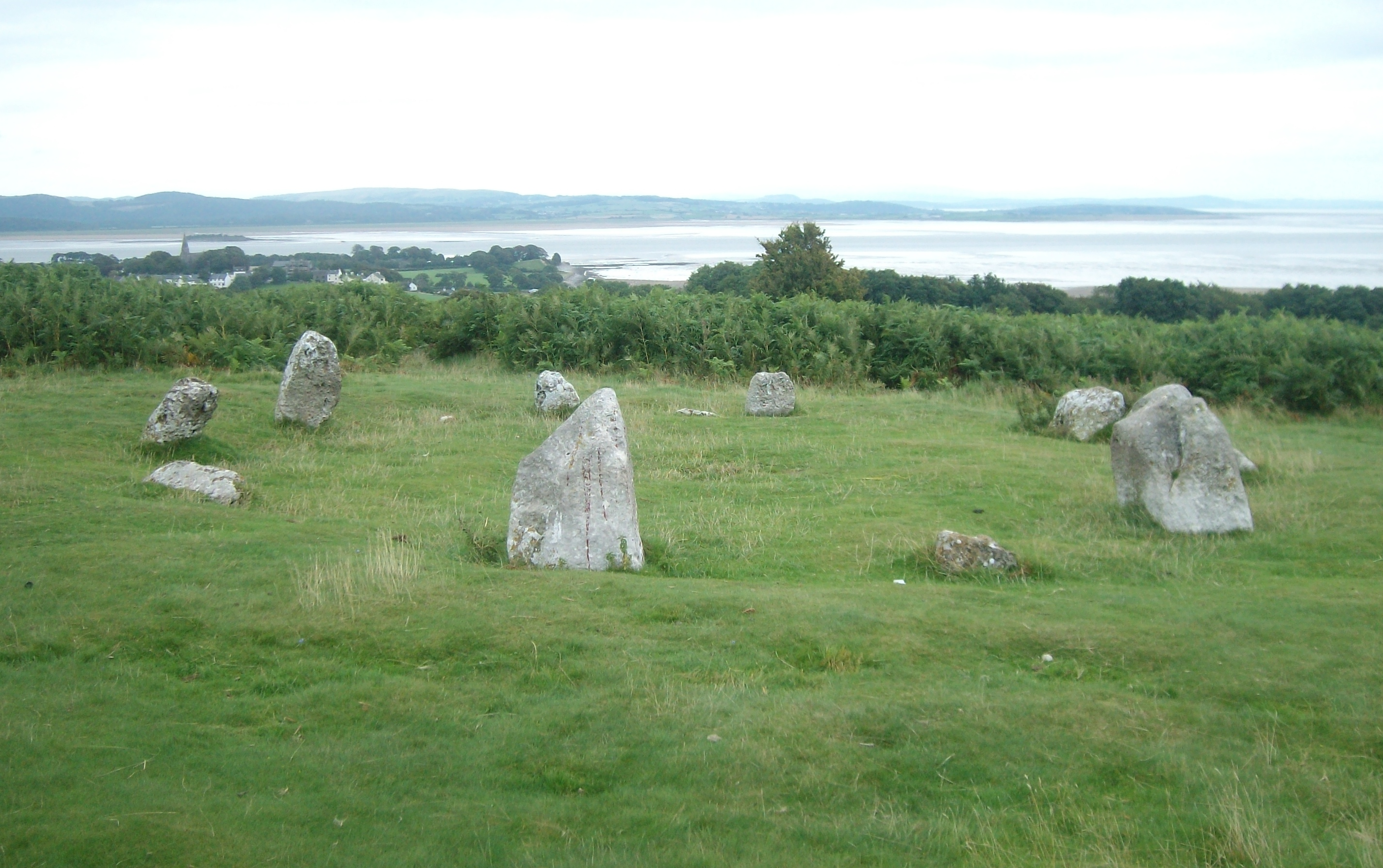
- Birkrigg stone circle

- Location in South Lakeland Location in Cumbria
- 54.15647°N 3.08489°W
- Type: Stone circle
- Periods: Neolithic / Bronze Age
- Location: Ulverston grid reference SD292739

The Birkrigg stone circle (also known as the Druid's Temple or Druids' Circle) is a Bronze Age stone circle on Birkrigg Common, two miles south of Ulverston in the English county of Cumbria.

== Description ==
The circle consists of two rings of stones, the inner being 8.5 m wide and consisting of 12 stones varying between 0.3 m and 0.9 m tall and the outer measuring 26 m and consisting of 20 smaller stones.

Limited excavation within the inner circle in 1911 found an upper and lower pavement of cobbles. Below the lower layer of cobbles five cremations were uncovered, three in pits, one on a layer of cobbles and one covered by an inverted urn. A second excavation in 1921 produced a few small stone implements which the excavator thought might be a pestle, a palate and a piece of red ochre, and which might therefore have had a ceremonial use.
