= Pennington, Cumbria =

Coordinates: 54.1833°N 3.1333°W

Pennington
- Village and parish
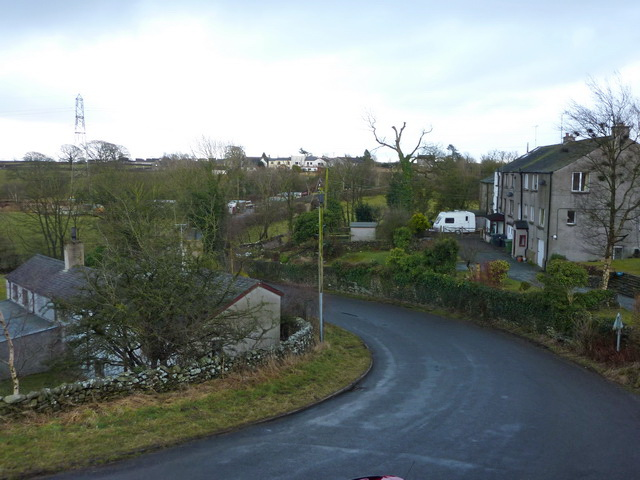
- Road in Pennington

- Location in the former South Lakeland district Location within Cumbria
- Population: 2,008 (2011 census)
- OS grid reference: SD260770
- Civil parish: Pennington
- Unitary authority: Westmorland and Furness
- Ceremonial county: Cumbria
- Region: North West
- Country: England
- Sovereign state: United Kingdom
- Post town: ULVERSTON
- Postcode district: LA12
- Dialling code: 01229
- Police: Cumbria
- Fire: Cumbria
- Ambulance: North West
- UK Parliament: Barrow and Furness

Pennington is a small village and civil parish in Furness, a region of Cumbria, England. Pennington lies between Ulverston, Rosside and Lindal. Pennington is located just off the nearby A590, with the nearest railway link in Ulverston.

== Population ==
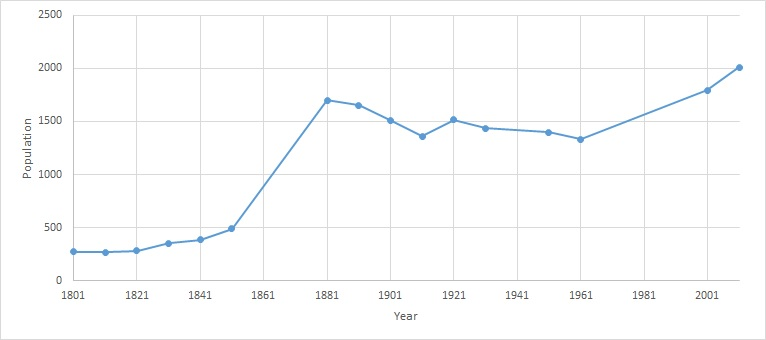
Total population of Pennington civil parish, Cumbria as reported by the Census from 1801 to 2011

In the 2001 census the parish had a population of 1,794, increasing to 2,008, according to the 2011 census. Over time there have been some significant fluctuations in the population. The most notable increase was between 1851 and 1881 when the population increased by over 1000, with 1881 seeing the population spike at 1,698. 1911 and 1961 saw a dip in the population of the parish, decreasing from 1,510 in 1901 to 1,361 in 1911. From 1961 onwards the population increased again, with the highest population being 2,008 (2011 census).

== Industry ==
Main occupations in Pennington in the 1881 census

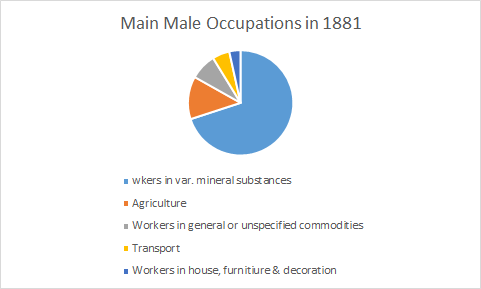
Male occupations

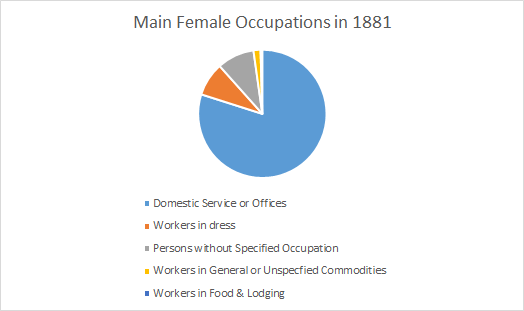
Female occupations

The 1881 census was the first census to become more specific with occupation data; it classifies information from 9 categories to 24. The pie chart depicts the top five male occupations in Pennington in 1881. The census information shows that the largest sector of employment for males at this time was in 'various mineral substances' which is essentially mining. The second largest sector of employment came from the Agriculture industry.

As true to this time in Britain, Pennington in 1881 had significantly fewer women in employment compared to men. From the women that were in employment at this time, the census shows that the majority of women were employed in the domestic services sector, with the second most population occupation was working in the dressmaking industry.

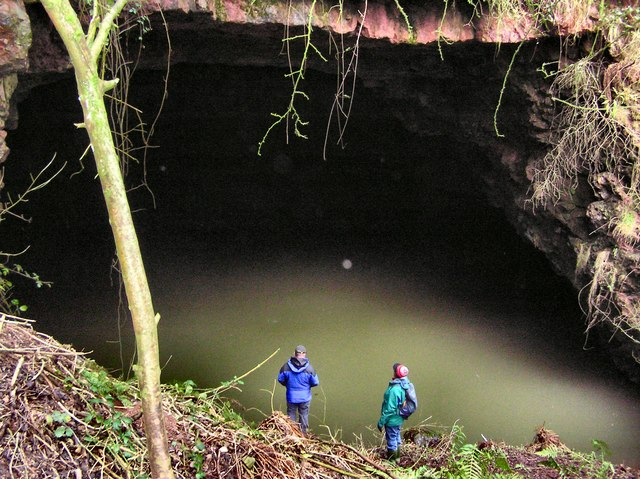
Iron ore mine

The industry sector has changed somewhat in Britain since 1881, with the decrease in primary sector employment such as mining and the increase in secondary and more recently tertiary sector of employment. This can be seen when specifically looking at Pennington when looking at the 2011 Census data. The largest sector of employment for males currently is the manufacturing industry with 126 men employed. As the gender balance has evened over time there are also many more females employed in 2011 compared to 1881 in Pennington. The largest sector of employment for females in Pennington is now in the human health and social work activities industry with 113 women working in this sector, according to key statistics from the 2011 census.

== Religious Identification ==
Pennington follows the regional and national trend with 1,491 of the 2,008 classing themselves as Christian. The second largest response about the religious views of the people of Pennington was 345 persons declaring themselves of no religion, which also follows the national trend. Other religions identified in Pennington include Buddhism of which 8 people identified themselves as Buddhist, Judaism in which 3 people identified themselves as, along with Islam and Sikhism both of which one person identified themselves as.

== Education ==
Pennington Church of England Primary school is the only primary school in the rural hamlet of Pennington. The school's most recent Ofsted report provides further information about the school. The school has a mixed gender of pupils with 172 pupils on roll. Due to being a faith school Pennington C of E Primary is categorised as being a Voluntary Controlled School. According to the most recent Ofsted report of 2006, the School received a Grade 1: Outstanding classification.

When looking at the 2011 Census data, we can see that there were 41 people who were in full-time education. From the census we can also see that 569 people in Pennington's highest level of education was at level 4 or higher. It is also shown from the Neighbourhood Statistics website that 282 people in Pennington in 2011 had no qualifications.

== History ==
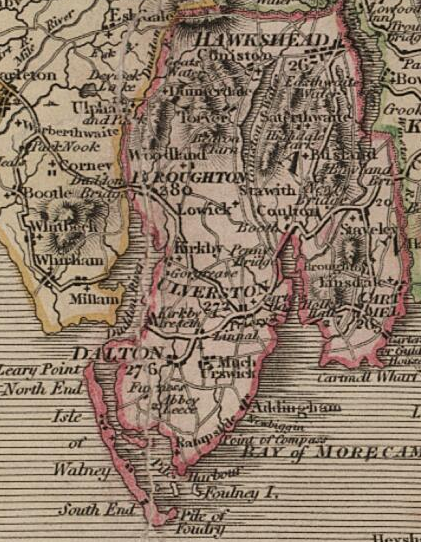
Historical map excerpt published by C.Smith

In the early 1870s, Pennington was described as:

PENNINGTON, a parish in Ulverston district, Lancashire; near the Furness railway, 1¾ mile W S W of Ulverston. It has a post-office under Ulverston. Acres, 2, 767. Real property, £18, 436; of which £7, 500 are in mines, and £2, 732 in quarries. Pop. in 1851, 489; in 1861, 879. Houses, 163. The increase of pop. arose from extension of mining operations.

It is thought that the name of Pennington came from the aristocratic family who inhabited Muncaster Castle a few miles away. The name likely arose from the Pennines chain of mountains that run through Northern England and Cumbria. When put together, the British word "pennig" (little hill) and the Saxon word "ton" (town) makes Pennington. Traditionally Muncaster Castle was always the seat of the Lord Pennington, whose history includes Sir William Pennington, Duke of Hertford. The Pennington family still has links to Muncaster, with the majority of the remaining descendants living in West Yorkshire.

There are a set of stocks outside the church gate that were used to punish offenders and there are runic inscriptions within the churchyard. In late 11th century England, Pennington is mentioned in the Domesday Book as one of the townships forming the Manor of Hougun which was held by Tostig Godwinson, Earl of Northumbria. The manor is exactly the same size as the parish which formerly belonged to the Cistercian Abbey of Furness, and includes 4,160 acres or six and one-half square miles. The parish was the smallest in Lancashire. The village was composed of 50 houses and 284 people in the mid-nineteenth century, and is about the same size today. The first recorded occurrence was spelled Pennigetun in the book.

Harry Christian, a soldier who was awarded the Victoria Cross, was born in Pennington.

To the west, in the nearby hamlet of Rosside, are the earthwork remains of Pennington Castle, a medieval ringwork.

== See also ==
- Listed buildings in Pennington, Cumbria
