= Beckside =

Village in Cumbria, England

Coordinates: 54.286°N 2.589°W

- Location in South Lakeland Location within Cumbria
- OS grid reference: SD616879
- Civil parish: Killington
- Unitary authority: Westmorland and Furness
- Ceremonial county: Cumbria
- Region: North West
- Country: England
- Sovereign state: United Kingdom
- Post town: CARNFORTH
- Postcode district: LA6
- Dialling code: 015396
- Police: Cumbria
- Fire: Cumbria
- Ambulance: North West
- UK Parliament: Westmorland and Lonsdale

Beckside is a hamlet in Cumbria, England. It was in the historic country of Westmorland.
