= Urswick Grammar School =

Defunct school in England

Coordinates: 54.150°N 3.127°W

- Urswick, Cumbria; England

Information
- Established: 1585
- Founder: Elizabeth I
- Closed: 1990s

Urswick Grammar School was located in Little Urswick, Cumbria, England. The school was founded in 1585 as the result of a royal charter granted by Queen Elizabeth I.

For the first few years, boys were educated by the minister in the church. Subsequently, the school building was built in Little Urswick.

== Amalgamation ==
This building, with various extensions, remained in use until the late 1990s, when the school was amalgamated with two other local primary schools to form Low Furness Primary School, which is located in Great Urswick. The disused school buildings have been converted into housing.

== Visit of Queen Elizabeth II ==
In 1985, the school celebrated its quatercentenary. In celebration of this fact the Queen visited the school. This was part of a year-long programme of Elizabethan-themed events.

== Resources ==
- Low Furness in the 17th and 18th centuries
