= Swarthmoor =

Village in Cumbria, England

Coordinates: 54.18356°N 3.12007°W

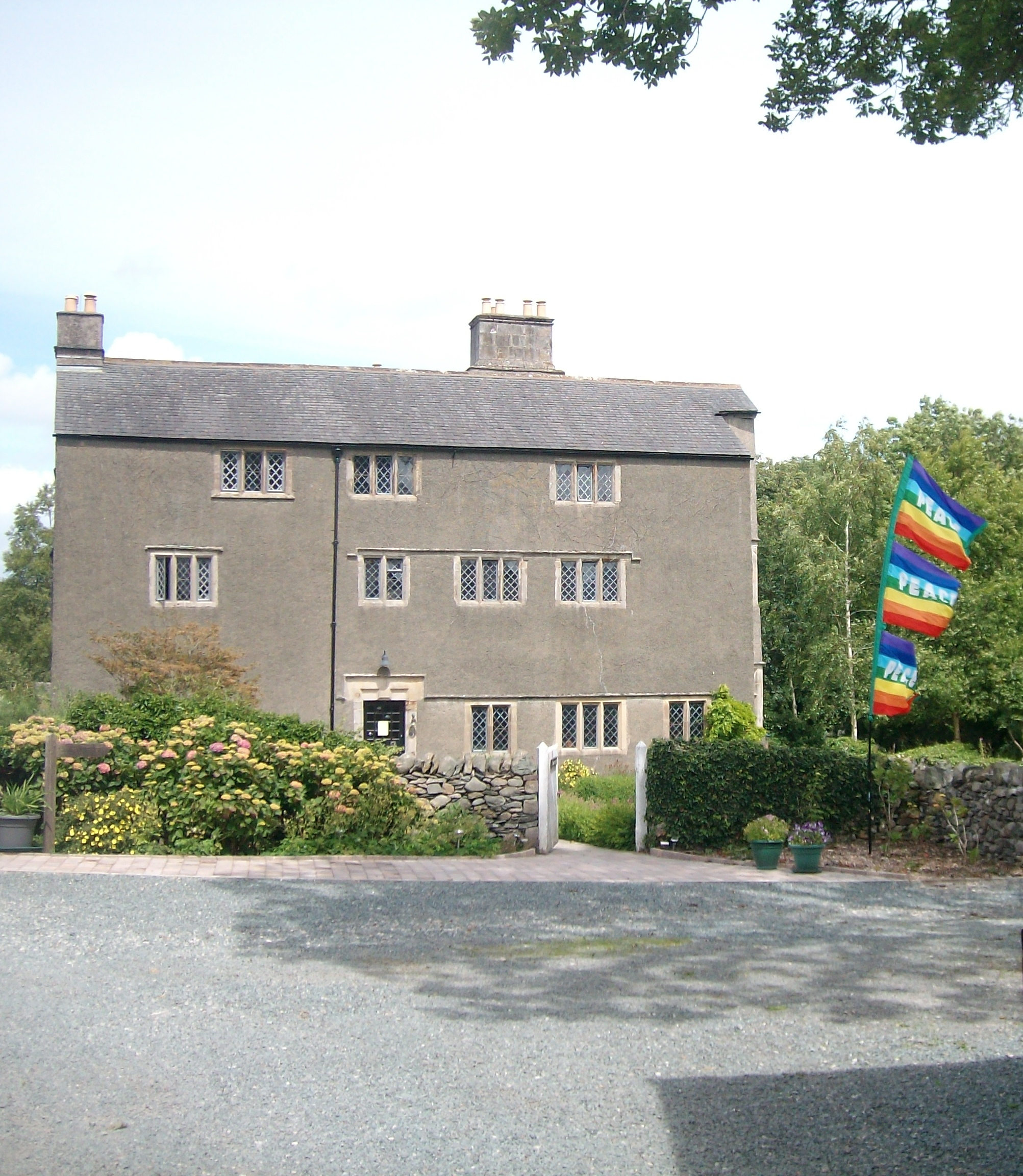
- Swarthmoor Hall

- Location in South Lakeland Location within Cumbria
- OS grid reference: SD2777
- Civil parish: Pennington
- Unitary authority: Westmorland and Furness
- Ceremonial county: Cumbria
- Region: North West
- Country: England
- Sovereign state: United Kingdom
- Post town: Ulverston
- Postcode district: LA12
- Dialling code: 01229
- Police: Cumbria
- Fire: Cumbria
- Ambulance: North West
- UK Parliament: Barrow and Furness

Swarthmoor is a small village near Ulverston, in Cumbria, England. Located on the Furness peninsula, it was historically part of Lancashire.

== Toponymy ==
Swarthmoor Village was named after its location on the Swarth Moor, which was formerly a marsh-covered moorland. The Swarth Moor's name was derived from the word sweart, meaning black.

== History ==
Before 1850 there were just a few farmsteads on Swarth Moor, and Swarthmoor Hall, which is located to the east of today's village. George Fox (1624–1691), a founder of the Quakers, came to the area in 1652 and was later allowed by Judge Thomas Fell (1598–1658) to use Swarthmoor Hall as a meeting place. Fox later purchased land from the Swarthmoor Estate to build Swarthmoor Friends' Meeting House. The modern village of Swarthmoor grew in the mid-19th century, with houses built to accommodate the workers from nearby iron ore mines, particularly the Lindal Moor Mines. Some of the houses in Fox Street were built by John Bolton ('Old Daddy Bolton'), who was a surveyor and geologist. As the village grew in size it joined with the hamlets of Cross-a-Moor and Trinkeld. In 1883 a reading room on Fox Street was opened by Lord Muncaster, as a place for local miners to read newspapers – the Reading Rooms building is now used by village organisations, its upper floor is the church of St Leonard.

== Swarthmoor Hall ==
Situated on the outskirts of the village is Swarthmoor Hall, where in 1652 George Fox founded the Quaker movement.

== Facilities in Swarthmoor ==
Swarthmoor is home to Swarthmoor Social Football Club Founded in 1946, the club has two adult teams who play in the Furness Premier League. The Junior set-up was re-formed in 2005 and has over 200 children playing ranging from 4 to 16 years old.

There is a public house in the village – The Miners Arms.
