= Swarthmoor Hall =

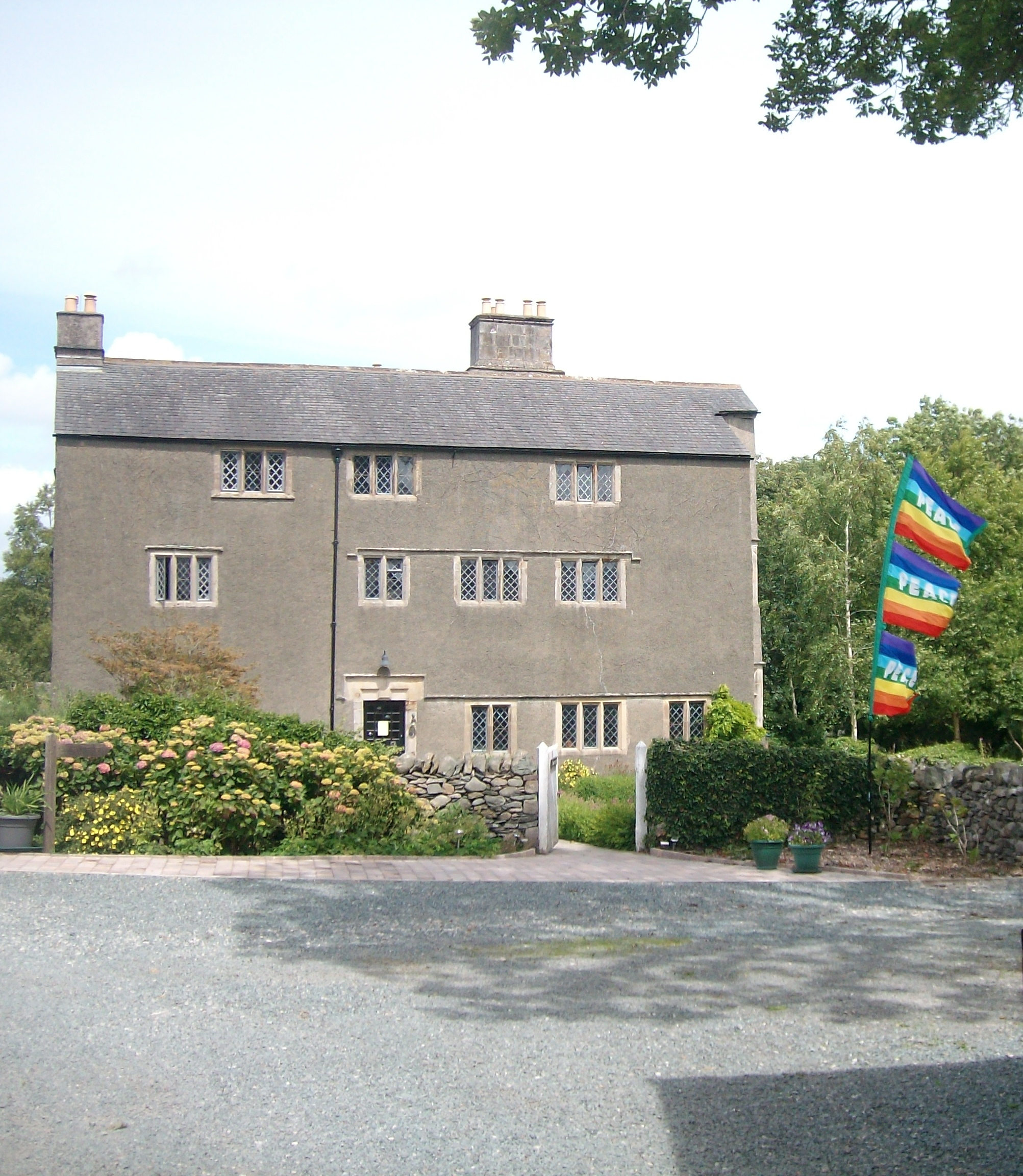

- Location within Cumbria
- 54°11′11.04″N 3°6′6.84″W
- OS grid reference: SD2818677293

History
- Built: 1568

Site notes
- Owner: London Yearly Meeting

Listed Building – Grade II*
- Official name: Register of Historic Parks and Gardens
- Type: Grade II*
- Designated: 1950

Swarthmoor Hall is a mansion at Swarthmoor, in the Furness area of Cumbria, North West England. Furness is part of the historic county of Lancashire. The Hall was home to Thomas and Margaret Fell, the latter an important player in the founding of the Religious Society of Friends (Quaker) movement in the 17th century. It is designated by English Heritage as a Grade II* listed building. It remains in use today as a Quaker retreat house.

== History ==
Swarthmoor Hall was built by a lawyer named George Fell about 1568. It was inherited by his son Thomas, a lawyer and later a member of Parliament, Vice Chancellor of the Duchy of Lancaster and an influential supporter of Parliament during the English Civil War. In 1634 Thomas married Margaret Askew and she moved into the Hall.

George Fox visited the Hall in 1652. Thomas Fell was travelling as a judge, but Fox had an audience with Margaret Fell, who became interested in his new doctrines. She arranged for him to preach in St Mary's Church in nearby Ulverston and at the Hall. During his time there, many people were convinced of the truth of his teachings.

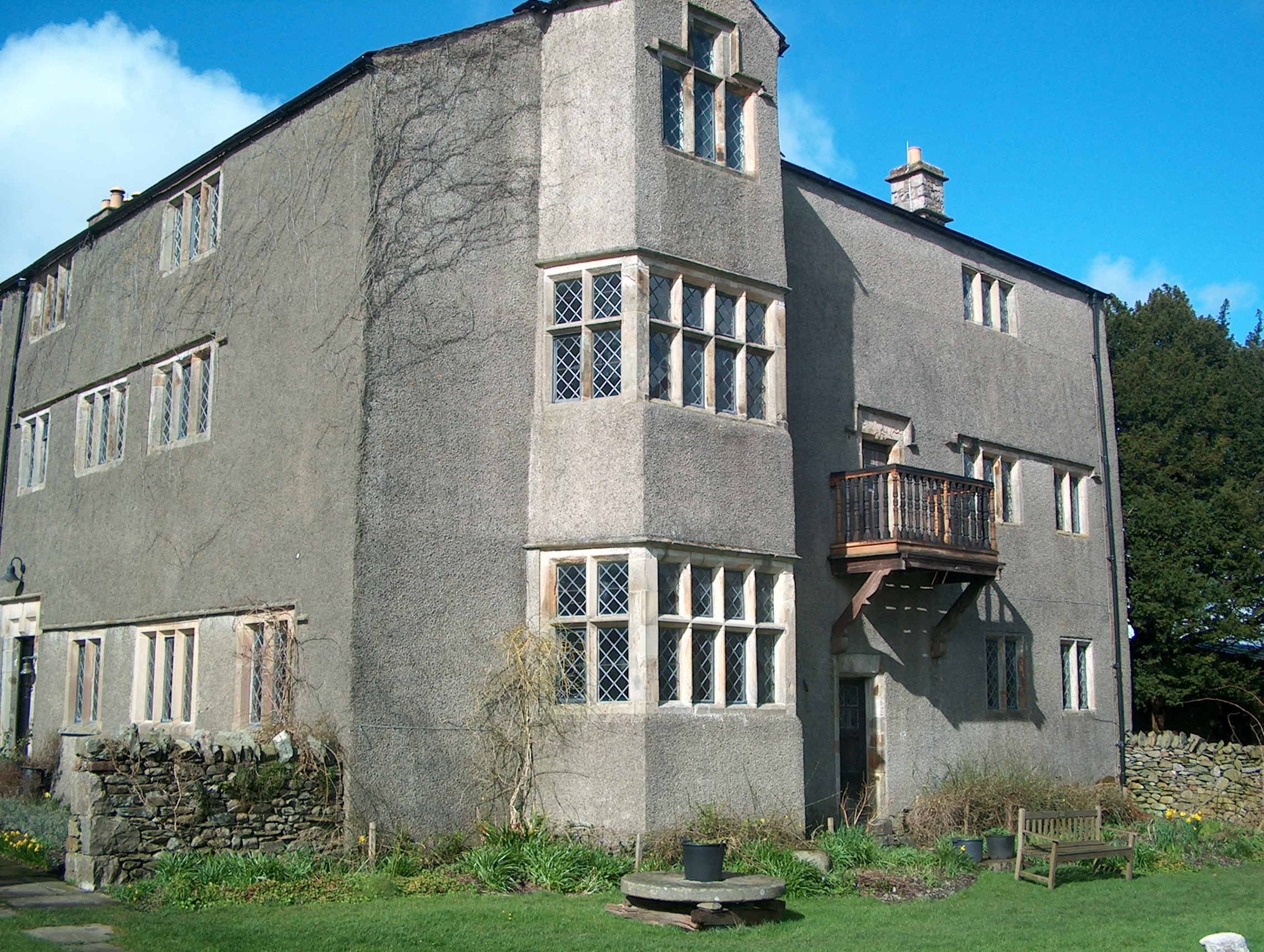
Swarthmoor Hall

When Thomas Fell returned home, he was persuaded by his wife and some others to listen to Fox, who successfully appealed to his pro-Parliamentary sentiments. Fell was never totally convinced by Fox's religious teachings, but he did allow his home to be used as a meeting house for the early Friends. Among those connected with the meeting were the missionary preachers Alice and Thomas Curwen, natives of nearby Baycliff, who were active in the Furness district, then in New England, Barbados and Nevis, and later in Huntingdonshire and other parts of England. The meeting continued to use the hall until 1691, when a meeting house was built nearby.

Thomas Fell died in 1658. Eleven years later George Fox married the widowed Margaret Fell, and when not travelling, occasionally lived at Swarthmoor. Fox died in London in 1691 and Margaret died at the Hall in 1702.

== Quaker functions ==
The London Yearly Meeting of the Religious Society of Friends purchased the Hall in 1951 for £9,000 and it still belongs to the Religious Society of Friends.

The annual Swarthmore Lecture is one of a series of lectures, started in 1908, addressed to the Britain Yearly Meeting of the Friends. The Quaker-founded Swarthmore College in Pennsylvania was named after Swarthmoor Hall. Swarthmoor is one of the four houses (Swarthmoor, Firbank, Pendle, Briggflatts) at the Quaker Bootham School, a boarding-school in York, and it was one of the three houses at Great Ayton Friends' School.

== See also ==
- Mary Dyer
