= Urswick =

Civil parish in Cumbria, England

Coordinates: 54.158°N 3.122°W

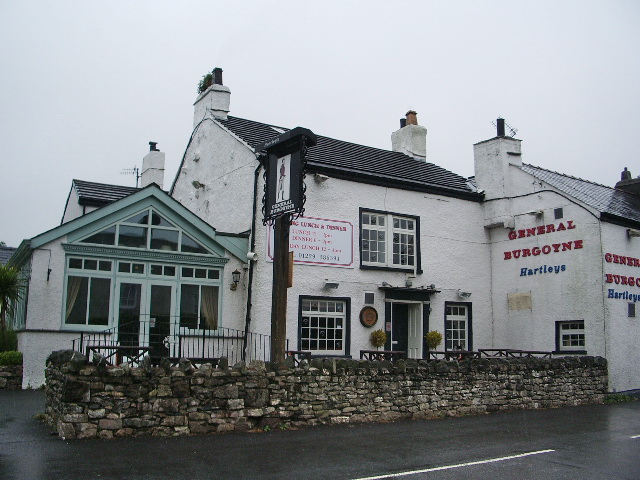
- The General Burgoyne public house, Great Urswick

- Location in South Lakeland Location within Cumbria
- Population: 1,397 (2011)
- OS grid reference: SD267741
- Civil parish: Urswick
- Unitary authority: Westmorland and Furness
- Ceremonial county: Cumbria
- Region: North West
- Country: England
- Sovereign state: United Kingdom
- Post town: ULVERSTON
- Postcode district: LA12
- Dialling code: 01229
- Police: Cumbria
- Fire: Cumbria
- Ambulance: North West
- UK Parliament: Barrow and Furness

Urswick is a civil parish that includes the villages of Great Urswick and Little Urswick. It is located in the Furness area of Cumbria, England. The villages are situated to the south-west of the town of Ulverston. In the 2001 census the parish had a population of 351, increasing at the 2011 census to 1,397.

Great Urswick is situated along the north and west sides of Urswick Tarn, a small body of water (c. 1100 feet by 600), although the largest such natural body in Low Furness. The tarn is fed from the surrounding hills and feeds Gleaston Beck to the south, the water is said to have a red hue due to the iron content of the surrounding land. Little Urswick, the smaller of the two settlements, stands further south on the lower slopes of a limestone outcrop known as Bolton Heads.

== Toponymy ==
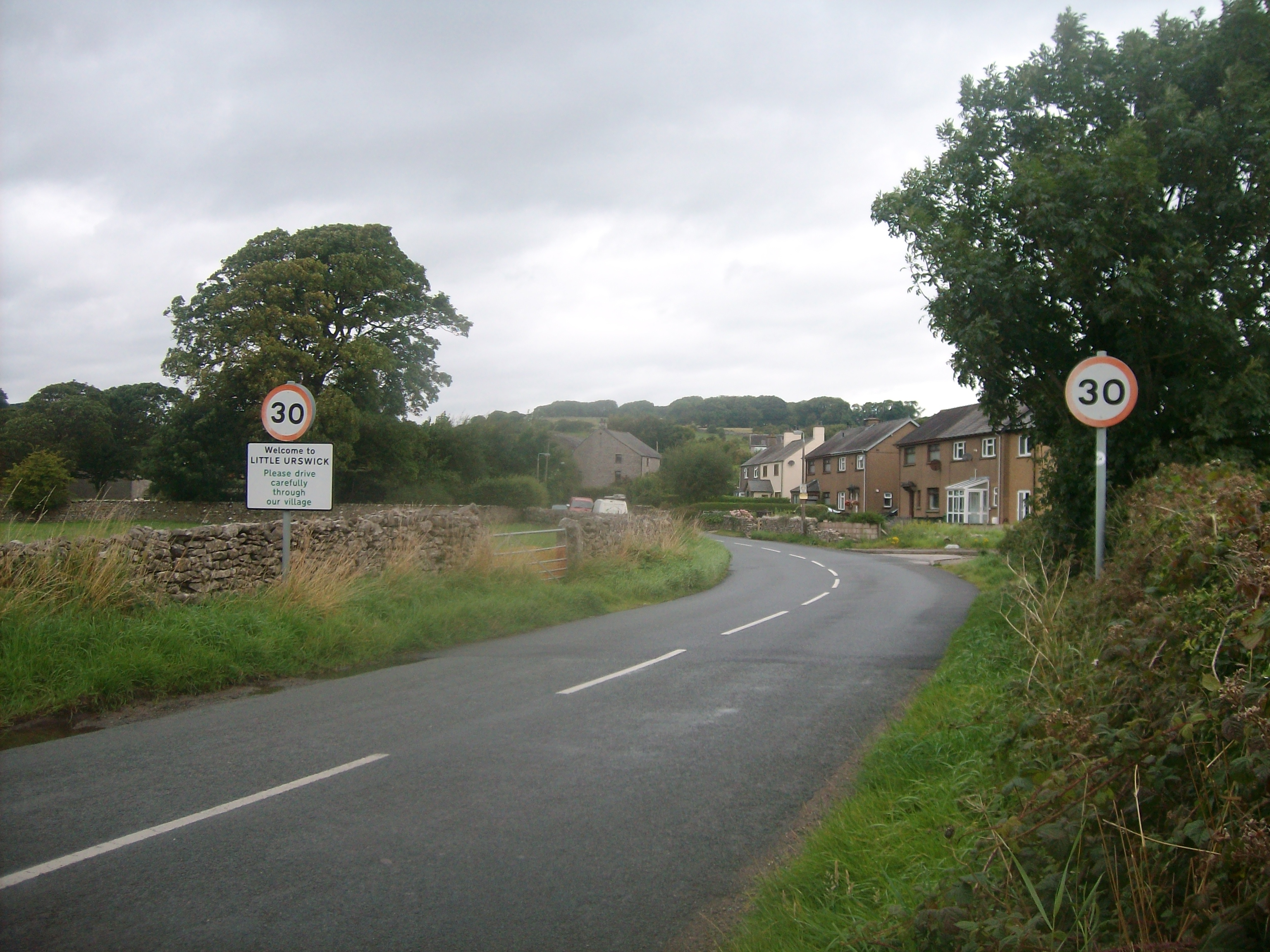
The start of Little Urswick

A number of explanations have been suggested for Urswick's name. The '-wick' element is perhaps from the Old English wic meaning 'farm' or 'trading centre', an element commonly found in settlements on or near Roman roads (see below). It has been suggested that the first element may mean 'bison lake' from Old English ur + sǣ . However, an alternative explanation has been proposed which incorporates the first definite historical reference to the ancient estate that incorporated the present Urswick villages – Chiluestreuic – from the Domesday survey (see references).

The name 'Great Urswick' originated as 'Much Urswick', not because of its size but because of its association with Michael le Fleming. The village was an original part of Michael's lands, granted to him before 1111 by Henry I, whilst Little Urswick belonged to Stephen of Blois and later Furness Abbey. The name 'Much Urswick', meaning 'Michael's Urswick', was used to differentiate between the lands of Michael and Furness Abbey.

== History ==
Urswick has visible remains of several prehistoric settlements, including a univallate hill fort known as Skelmore Heads, on the hills overlooking the village. There can be little doubt that the history of the village dates back to the Bronze Age or further, given the wealth of ancient sites in the local area. In 2023 it was confirmed that a human bone and a periwinkle shell bead found in Heaning Wood Bone Cave in Great Urswick were about 11,000 years old, representing "clear evidence of Mesolithic burials in the north [of England]".

The history of Roman presence in the village, as with the rest of Furness, is currently under investigation. Finds of Roman coins, including pre-invasion issues, from Furness indicate that the Romans were active in the area from the earliest days of the Roman invasion. An article published in 2007 made a claim for Roman military activity focused on what later became Dalton-in-Furness: the medieval secular capital of Furness. The author bases his argument on observations made by an 18th-century antiquarian; unsupported by 20th and 21st century investigations providing evidence for Roman archaeology. Such evidence would undoubtedly include Roman finds linked to contexts discovered in the evaluation of archaeological loci where Roman activity is suspected during late 20th and early 21st century urban development. Despite the cutting of many service and foundation trenches in Dalton, no such evidence has been revealed. This strongly suggests that this approach remains speculative at best.

Roman finds, including coins, have been found by metal-detector users to the west of Great Urswick. Field survey by the Urswick Origins Discovery Programme (UODP) in 2003 and 2004 also located and recorded a significant quantity of worked red, (St Bees) sandstone masonry in the walls of the Church of St Mary and St Michael, (see below) and in field walls to the north-west and west of the church. St Bees sandstone is not native to Urswick parish. The sandstone found by the UODP teams is considered unlikely to have belonged to a (long-demolished) medieval building or buildings; partly because the majority of it occurs in field walls and in the church and churchyard walls between the medieval villages of Great and Little Urswick. Some pieces also show distinctive tooling and other features (such as bar or cramp slots) that find comparison with tooling and features on masonry from Roman sites on Hadrian's Wall and its hinterland. Sandstones are known to have been imported and worked for specific architectural features in Roman forts elsewhere in Cumbria – for example, at Waterhead (Ambleside) and Hardknott in Eskdale. In 2004 the UODP ran an evaluation excavation project alongside a commissioned professional geophysical survey, (by UK-based GSB Prospection) of 1.08ha of two fields to the west and south-west of Great Urswick's church, (see below) to test the results from the field survey. The results of the geophysical survey were published – Life Before Barrow – Part 1: Urswick Origins Discovery Programme Interim Report 1 – 2004-5: First Light Heritage Agency, Ulverston 2005.

In 2005, following an eleven-year historical research and archaeological survey, evaluation excavation and remote sensing investigation programme; excavations began on what was considered through a range of field and remote sensing evidence, (see above) to be the site of a 1st-century/early 2nd century Roman fort, organised by First Light Heritage Agency with the aid of students from the University of Cardiff's Archaeology Department and local people. The outcomes of the 2004 and 2005 projects have received local criticism which failed to fully take into account evidence resulting from an 8-year study of the site published in 2002 (available from Oxbow Books, Oxford: see reference below.) Critics also chose to ignore evidence published in 2005 resulting from the 2003-4 field survey, evaluation excavation and geophysical survey (see above). The first interim publication of the 2004/5 archaeological interventions will appear in 2012 via a new website dedicated to the archaeology of the Lake District and Cumbria.

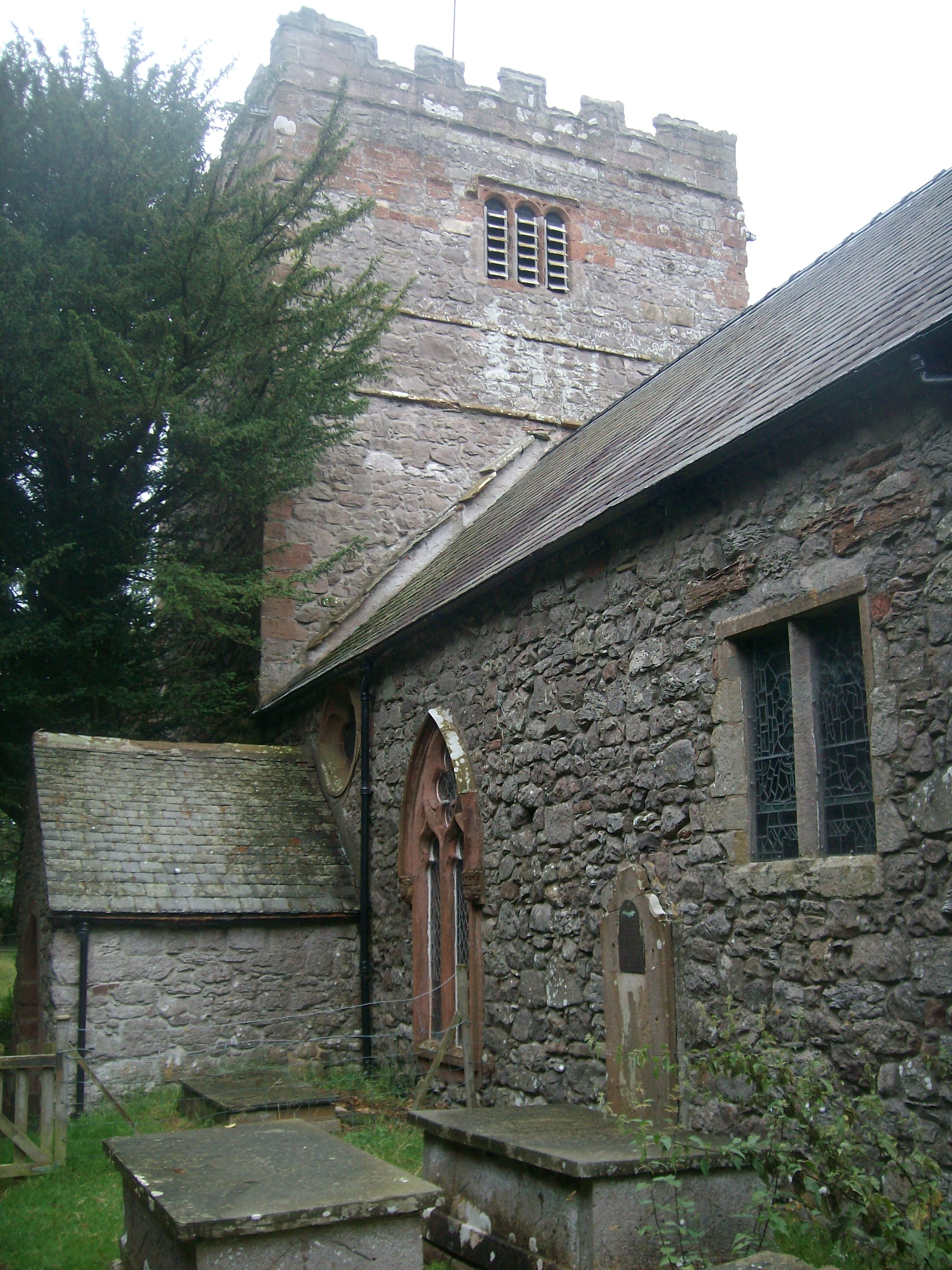
St. Mary's and St. Michael's Church

There has also been research to suggest that some of the fabric of the present St Mary & St Michael's Church (previously St Mary's) may date back to the sub-Roman period. The early medieval origins of the church were first highlighted in the early 20th century when fragments of two early Christian stone crosses were discovered built into the church fabric – one with a significant Anglo-Saxon runic inscription and sculptural representation of two figures. A specific historical context for this Anglo-Saxon inscription and depiction has been proposed, (see references), and an archaeological and historical context for an early medieval religious site, incorporating a post-Roman, pre-Norman church forming the focus for a significant large early Christian monastic estate.

It has further been suggested that this early historic estate may be the birthplace of St Patrick: a theory which has been challenged chiefly by some Cumbrian prehistorians, industrial and commercial sector archaeologists and historic environment curators – again without full and proper reference to the historical and archaeological investigations; the first phase of which was published in 2002, (as noted above), and ongoing from 2002 to the present.

Urswick was probably recorded in the Domesday Survey, as part of a larger estate – Hougun. The name Hougun may derive from the Old Norse word haugr: meaning hill or mound. Houganai or island of Hougun was also the name given to the nearby island of Walney Island.

As noted above, it has been suggested that it may be Chiluestreuic, previously thought to refer to the now lost Killerwick near Dalton-in-Furness. The 'chil-' element, probably representing Old Irish cill, referring to a monastery or hermit's cell, certainly fits if Urswick was home to an early monastery.

In the 12th century, Great Urswick became part of the manor of Muchland, whilst Little Urswick remained within the Liberty of Furness belonging to Stephen of Blois who later granted it to Furness Abbey. The Abbey also claimed rights to the already ancient St Mary's Church, which led to a long running dispute with the lords of Muchland, finally settled in the Abbey's favour. In the 13th century Little Urswick was part of an exchange of land between the Abbey and Muchland and was ceded to the latter.

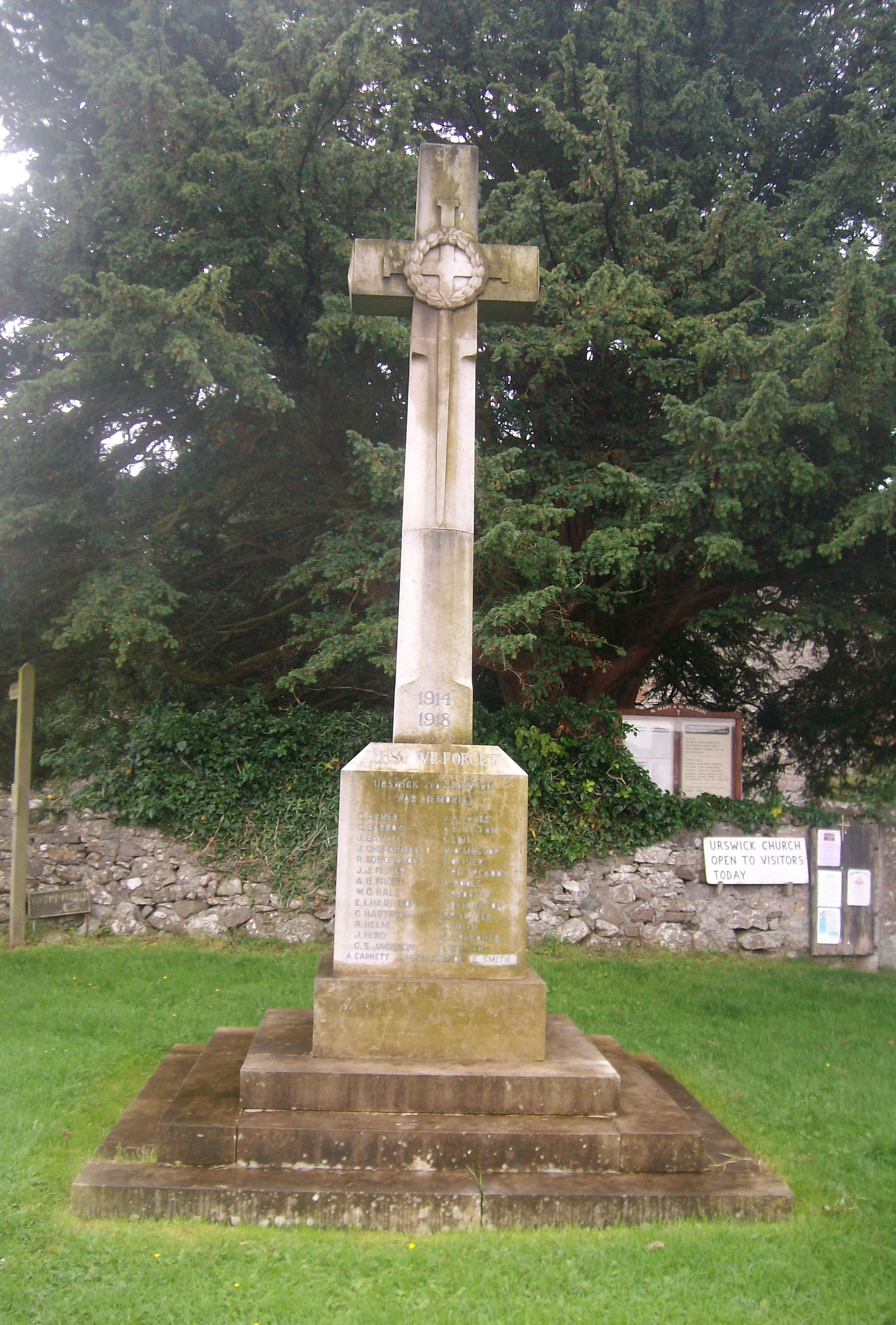
World War I memorial outside the church

Nowadays, Urswick has largely become a commuter village for the towns of Ulverston and Barrow-in-Furness. However, agriculture also remains important, with the villages surrounded by farms.

In February 2024 an alligator snapping turtle was discovered in Urswick Tarn, by parish councillor Denise Chamberlain.

== In popular culture ==
Little Urswick has an entry in The Meaning of Liff ("(n.) The member of any class who most inclines a teacher towards the view that capital punishment should be introduced in schools.")

== See also ==
- Listed buildings in Urswick
- Urswick Grammar School

== Other sources ==
- Dickinson, S (2002); The Beacon on the Bay : the discovery of an early Christian church and monastic site at Great Urswick, Low Furness, Cumbria, and the case for its connections with St.Ninian, St.Patrick, St.Hild and St.Columba.
- British Archaeology – the Council for British Archaeology publication: issues 87 (March/April 2006), 88, (May/June 2006) and 89 (July/August 2006) for an article about the church and the 2004/5 excavations and remote sensing programme (Issue 87), a letter of critique, (Issue 88) and a rebuttal (Issue 89).
