= Wadham, Knowstone =

Historic manor in Devon, England

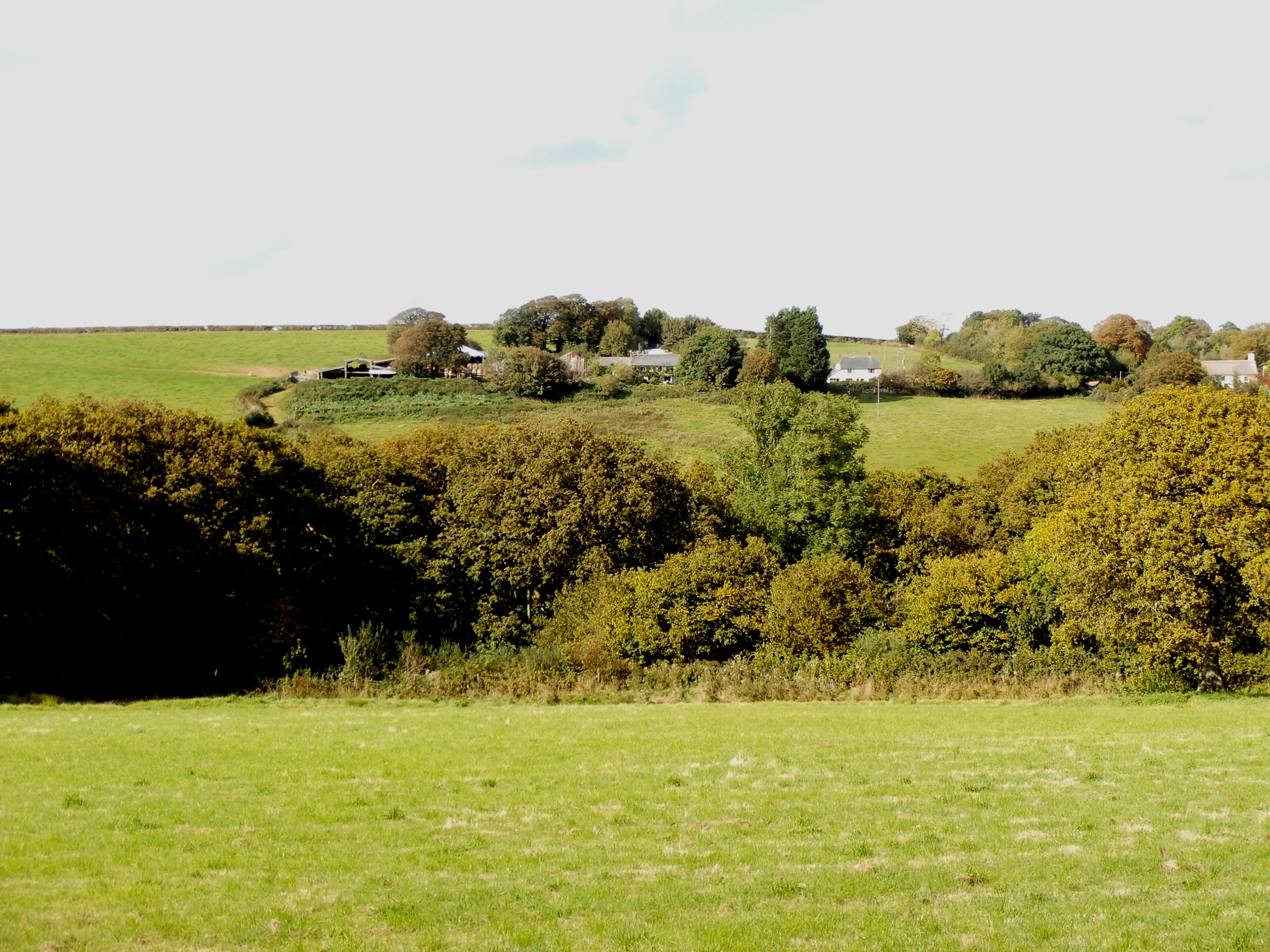
Wadham, panorama viewed from south

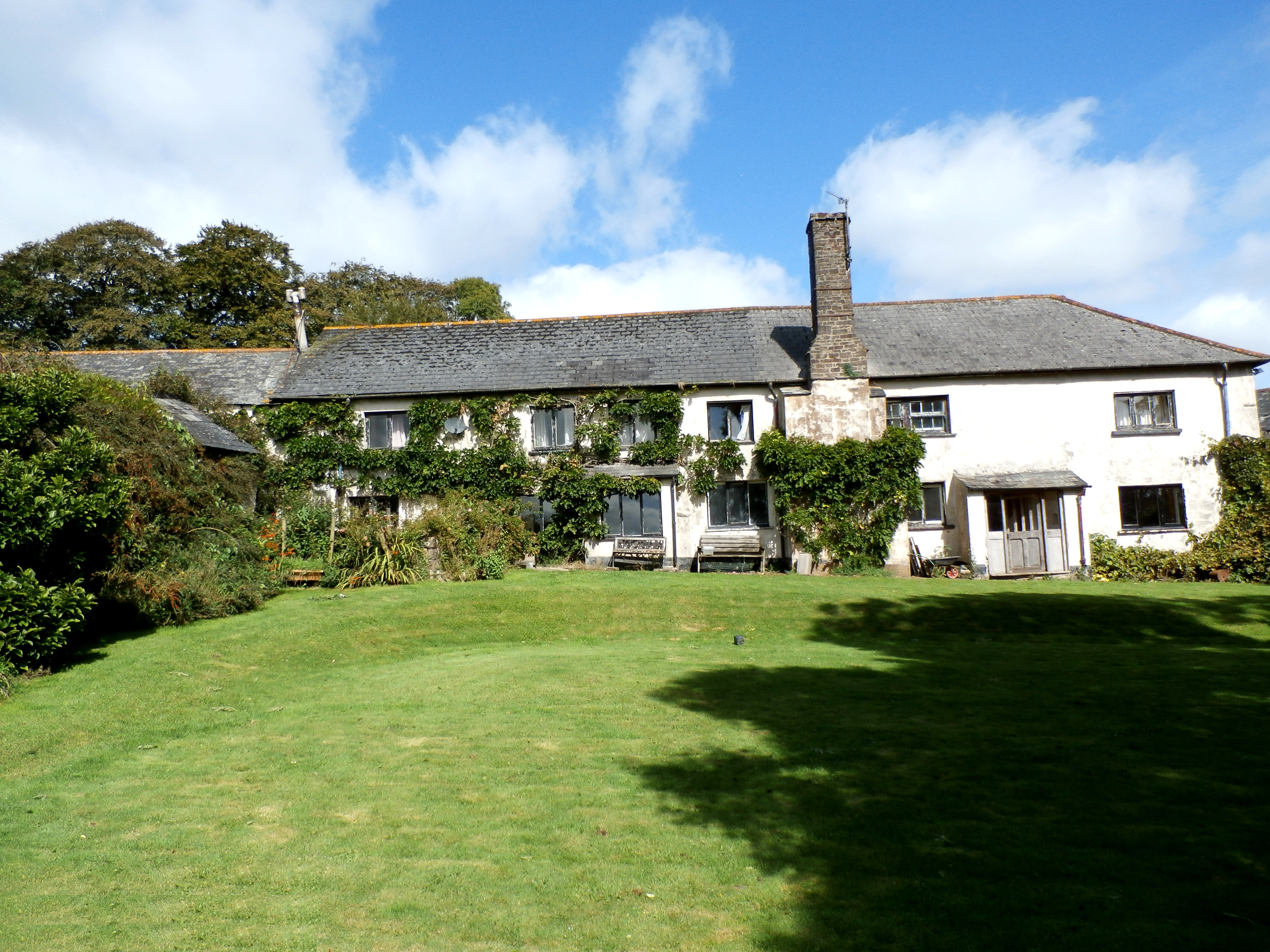
Wadham Barton, Knowstone, in 2014

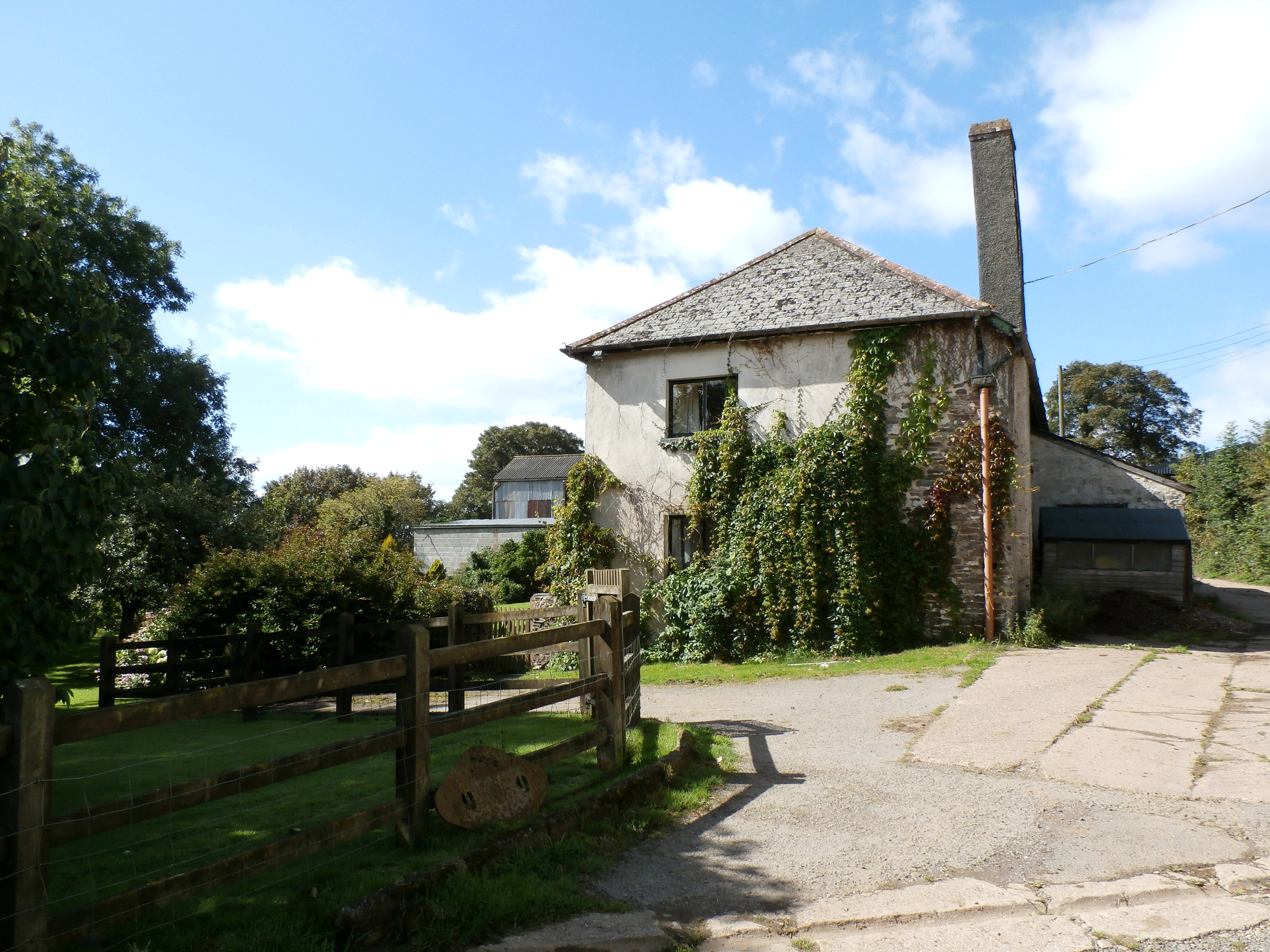
Wadham Barton, approach from east

The manor of Wadham in the parish of Knowstone in north Devon and the nearby manors of Chenudestane and Chenuestan (more anciently known as Cnudstone and Cnuston with the possible meaning "Canutestone") are listed in the Domesday Book of 1086: "Ulf holds Wadeham. He himself held it in the time of King Edward" ('The Confessor').

Samuel Lysons suggested in his Magna Britannia that Ulf may have been an ancestor to the Wadhams.

'Wadeham' was the earliest recorded residence of the prominent Wadham (originally de Wadham) family, which ended in the senior male line in the person of Nicholas Wadham (1531–1609) of Merryfield, Ilton in Somerset and Edge, Branscombe in Devon, co-founder of Wadham College, Oxford, founded largely after his death, by his wife Dorothy Wadham (died 1618).

== Descent ==
=== Ulf ===
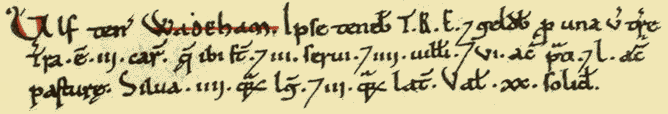
Domesday Book entry for WADEHAM

The Domesday Book of 1086 lists WADEHAM as held in chief from King William the Conqueror by Ulf, one of 'the king's (Saxon) thanes' in Devonshire.

It has also been suggested that Ulf, a possible supporter of King Canute rewarded with land in Devon, may have been of Danish or Anglo-Danish descent.

Ulf, who before 1066 held Wadeham and other manors in Devon and elsewhere in Wessex, and still retained Wadeham under the Saxon King Edward the Confessor, was one of only twenty Saxon thanes in Devonshire who survived the Norman Conquest of 1066, retained their antiquated high status as thanes, and became tenants-in-chief under the new Norman king. However, he appears less prominent than some others of his fellow surviving Devonshire thanes who held up to eleven manors each under King William the Conqueror after 1086, whilst Ulf only added the manor of Axminster which he held from William Cheever, alias Chièvre after 1086 from the King in desmesne. The Domesday text is as follows:

Ulf ten(et) WADEHAM. Ipse teneb(at) T(empore) E(dwardi) R(egis). Geld(a)b(at) p(ro) una v(irgata) t(er)rae. T(er)ra e(st) III car(rucis) q(uae) ibi s(un)t. III servi, IIII vill(an)i, VI ac(rae) pti L ac(rae) pasturae, silva IIII l(on)g(a) III lat(a). Valet XX solidii ("Ulf holds Wadham. He himself held it in the time of King Edward (the Confessor). It paid tax for 1 virgate of land. Land for 3 ploughs which are there. 3 slaves, 4 villagers, 6 acres of ..., 50 acres of pasture, wood 4 furlongs long, 3 furlongs wide. It is worth 20 shillings).

The Exon Domesday contains additional text after the description of the woodland, translated as "8 wild mares, 12 cattle".

The Domesday Book also has entries for both Chenuestan and Chenudestane as being held from the King by his thane Aelfgar, or Algar. As an Algar de Wadham and his 'Lady' Wadham are recorded in the reign of Henry III (1207-1272), it seems possible that the Algar of 1086 may too have been an ancestor.

=== Bret ===
According to Pole (died 1635) the family of Bret later held Wadham. No further details are provided by Pole or by his contemporary Risdon (died 1640) about this tenant. Risdon did however state that in the time of King Henry II (1154–1189) the lord of the manor of Knowstone was Ailmer de Brett. A Brett family, today represented by Viscount Esher, was anciently seated at Whitestaunton in Somerset and in the late 15th century inherited the manor of Pilland in the parish of Pilton, North Devon, where they resided for about a century.

=== Beaupel ===
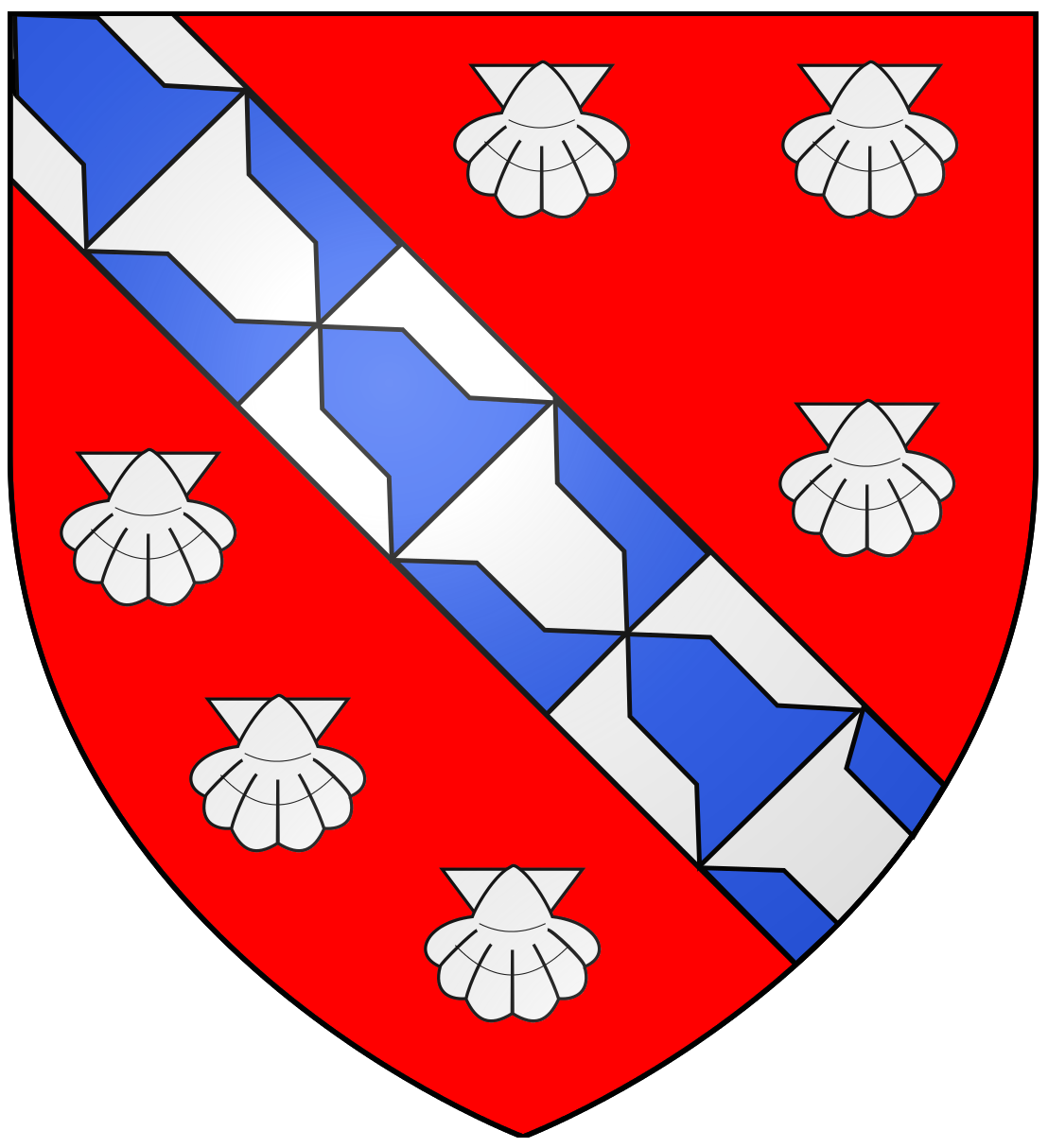
Arms of Beaupel of Landkey and Knowstone: Gules, a chevron vair between six escallops argent

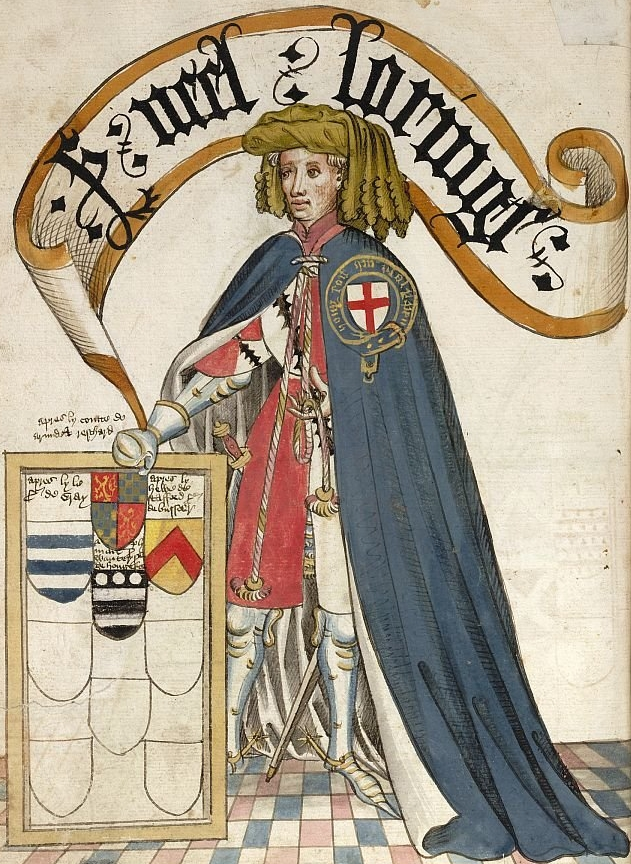
"Sr Neel Loringe": Sir Nele Loring, KG, shown wearing his garter robes over his tunic showing the arms: Quarterly argent and gules, a bendlet engrailed sable. Illustration from the 1430 "Bruges Garter Book" made by William Bruges (1375–1450), first Garter King of Arms

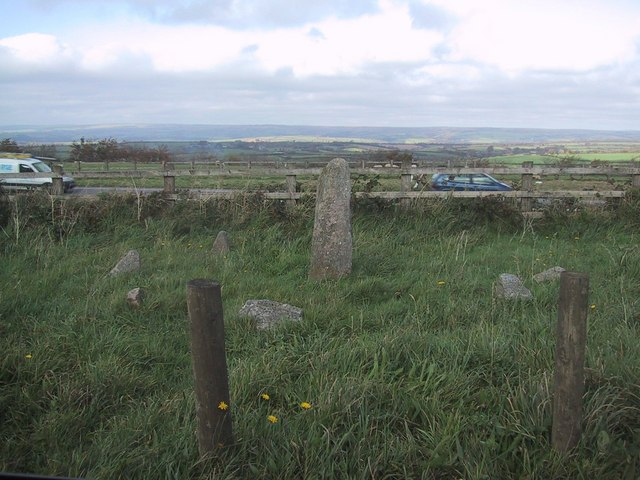
Ancient standing stone on Beaple's Moor, Knowstone, showing vehicles on the North Devon Link Road behind

From Brett the estate or manor of Wadham passed to the family of Beaupel, lord of the manors of Knowstone and of Landkey in North Devon. Ailmer de Brett, lord of the manor of Knowstone in the time of King Henry II (1154–1189), granted Knowstone to Richard Beaple "whose posterity made this place their dwelling, of which family were divers knights". In the Book of Fees it is recorded that Richard Beupel held "Cnuston" from the feudal barony whose caput was at Marshwood, in Dorset held until the early 13th. century by the Mandeville family, Earls of Essex. In the parish church of Landkey there exist three stone effigies of the Beupel family who held that manor also from the See of Exeter. Knowstone was acquired together with the neighbouring manor of Molland by William de Bottreaux, who gave both churches to Hartland Abbey in 1160. The estate of Beaple was inherited from his wife Margaret de Beaupel by Sir Nele Loring, KG (c. 1320 – 1386) one of the founding members and 20th Knight of the Order of the Garter, established by King Edward III in 1348. He married Margaret de Beaupel, the daughter, and apparently the heiress, of Sir Ralph de Beaupel. There exists today about 1 mile SW of Knowstone village the still-important farmhouse called "Beaple's Barton", bordered to the south by Beaple's Moor and to the north by Beaple's Wood. He appears in ancient records as "Nele Loring of Knowston-Beaupell". By marriage he also came to hold the manor of Landkey, 2 miles east of Barnstaple and 16 miles west of Knowstone. They had the following progeny, two daughters and co-heiresses:

- Isabel (died 21 August 1400), who married twice:
  - Firstly to Sir William Cogan (probably of the Cogan family, feudal barons of Bampton, Devon) before 1382.
  - Secondly, in about 1383, to Sir Robert Harington, 3rd Baron Harington (1357–1406), son of John Harington, 2nd Baron Harington (1307–1363), by Joan de Bermingham. Isabel's son by her second marriage was John Harington, 4th Baron Harrington (1384–1418), whose very high quality and well-preserved alabaster effigy exists in the Church of St Dubricius, Porlock, Somerset.
- Margaret, the wife of John Peyvre of Tuddington (Toddington) in Bedfordshire.

On the division of Loring's lands between his co-heiresses Beaple fell to the lot of Lord Harrington, whose heiress brought it to the family of Bonville, whose heiress brought it to the Grey family, which forfeited all its lands to the crown on the execution of the Duke of Suffolk and his daughter Lady Jane Grey.

From the crown the manor was purchased by Robert Pollard, a younger son of the judge Sir Lewis Pollard (c. 1465 – 1526) of King's Nympton, Justice of the Common Pleas and MP for Totnes. According to Risdon, Robert Pollard made it his family's home for many generations" but certainly by 1653 it had passed to the ownership of the Courtenay family of Molland, as a deed of that date includes the manor of "Knowstone Beaples" in a long list of properties transferred into trust by John Courtenay and his wife Margaret.

=== Wadham ===
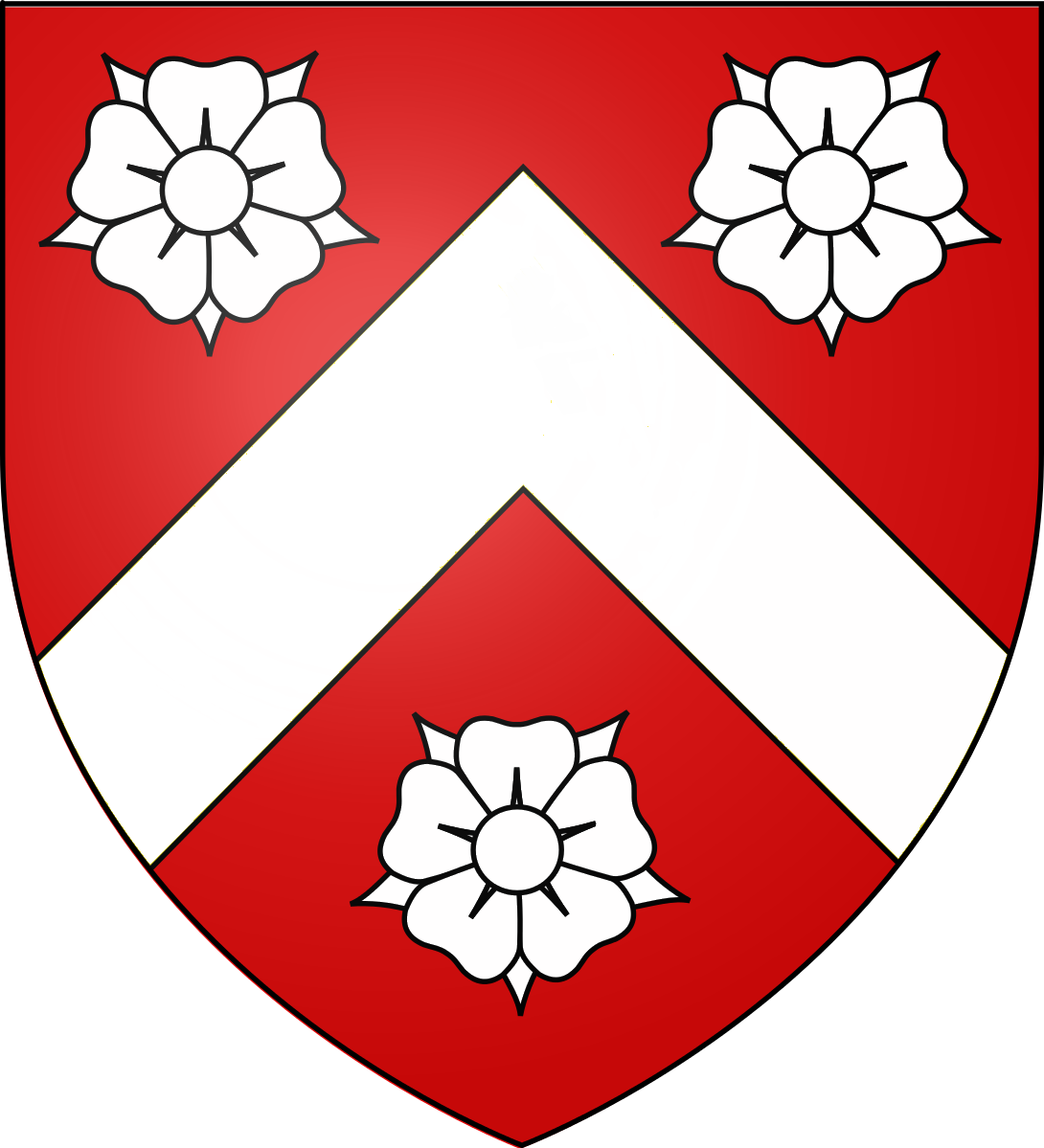
Arms of Wadham: Gules, a chevron between three roses argent

According to Pole, by the reign of Henry Bolingbroke, King Henry IV (1399–1413) the manors or estates of East Wadham and West Wadham were held by Sir John Wadham, Justice of the Common Pleas from 1389 to 1398 during the reign of King Richard II, whose family (originally de Wadham) had taken its name from the estate.

In fact, the Wadham family had held Wadham, Knowstone from at least as far back as the reign of King Edward I (1272-1307), and in the reign of King Edward III (1327-1377) acquired the estate of Edge, Branscombe, Devon, which they made their principal seat until, in about 1400, John Wadham 'the judge', built a fortified manor house at Merryfield, Ilton, Somerset.

The descent of the Wadham family of Wadham, Knowstone, and Edge, Branscombe both in Devon and Merryfield, Ilton in Somerset is given by Sir William Pole (1531-1635) as follows:

==== Sir John I Wadham ====
Sir John I Wadham, who according to Pole dwelled at Edge in the latter end of the reign of King Edward III (1327–1377)

==== Sir John II Wadham (died 1412) ====
Sir John Wadham, Justice of the Common Pleas (1389–1398) (said by Pole, apparently in error, to have been Justice of the King's Bench), MP for Exeter in 1399 and for Devon in 1401. He was one of Prince's Worthies of Devon. Although Pole (followed by Prince (died 1723)) stated him to be the son of Sir John Wadham above, his modern History of Parliament biographer, perhaps unaware of Pole as Prince's source, suggested he was the son of Gilbert Wadham, who in 1383 quitclaimed to him a rent in Wadham, which deed was witnessed by Sir John's close friend Sir William Hankford (c. 1350 – 1423) of Annery in Devon, Chief Justice of the King's Bench from 1413 until 1423. He acquired much land in Devon, Somerset, Dorset and Gloucestershire, which were valued at £82 per annum in an incomplete survey of 1412 and valued at about £115 in his inquisition post mortem in 1412. His Devon landholdings included the manors of Silverton and half the manor of Harberton (both purchased, in 1386 and 1390 respectively, from Cecily Turberville, sister and heiress of John de Beauchamp, 3rd Baron Beauchamp of Hatch) (1329–1361)) and Lustleigh and he acquired over 300 acres of land in Branscombe and elsewhere. Silverton, like Edge, descended to the Wyndham family and Silverton Park (alias Egremont House), a large neo-Classical mansion, was built there in 1839–45 by George Wyndham, 4th Earl of Egremont (1786–1845) and demolished in 1901. His landholdings in Somerset were even more extensive than those in Devon and mostly consisted of properties forfeited by Sir John Cary, Chief Baron of the Exchequer. These lands included Hardington Mandeville, a moiety of Chilton Cantelo, and premises in Trent (now in Dorset) he purchased jointly with Hankford in 1389. These large landholdings in Somerset appear to have moved his principal interest away from Devon and the manor of Edge, and towards the end of his life he made his principal residence at Merryfield, Ilton, near Ilminster, Somerset, which he had purchased from Cecily Turberville. At Merryfield he built a substantial fortified manor house, demolished after 1618, of which only the rectangular moat survives today in the middle of agricultural land south of RAF Merryfield aerodrome. He married Joan Wrothesley.

==== William Wadham (died 1452) ====
William Wadham (died 1452) (son), of Merryfield, Sheriff of Devon in 1442, whose monumental brass (said by Rogers (1888) to depict him with his mother) survives in St Mary's Church, Ilminster, Somerset. He married Margaret Chiseldon, a daughter and co-heiress of John Chiseldon of Holcombe Rogus in Devon.

==== Sir John III Wadham ====
Sir John III Wadham, eldest son and heir, who married Elizabeth Popham, a daughter and co-heiress of Sir Stephen Popham (c. 1386 – 1444) of Popham, Hampshire, five times MP for Hampshire (of which Popham family another branch was seated at Huntworth, Somerset. (see John Popham (Lord Chief Justice) (c. 1531 – 1607), Speaker of the House of Commons and Lord Chief Justice of England). It was from this marriage, according to other sources (such as Rogers, 1888), that the Wadhams inherited Merryfield, which they made their principal seat.

==== Sir John IV Wadham ====
Sir John IV Wadham, son and heir, who married Elizabeth Stucley, a daughter of Sir Hugh Stucley (1496–1559) of Affeton, Devon, Sheriff of Devon in 1545.

==== Sir Nicholas I Wadham ====
Sir Nicholas I Wadham, son and heir, who married four times. By his wife Joan Hill, daughter of Robert Hill of Halsway he had issue Lawrence Wadham, who died without progeny, and John Wadham (died 1578), his eventual heir.

==== John V Wadham (died 1578) ====
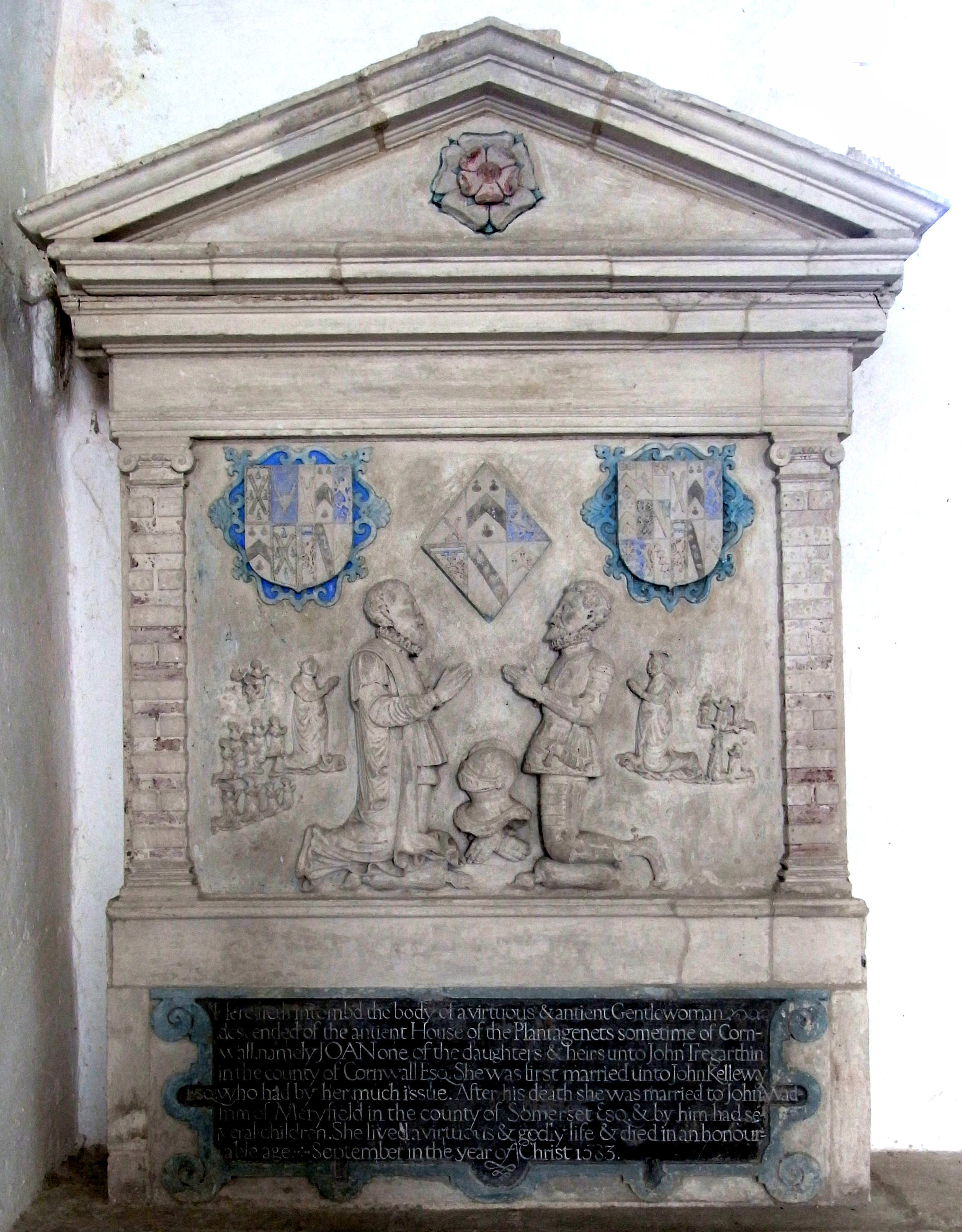
Mural monument to Joan Tregarthin (died 1583) widow successively of John Kelloway and John V Wadham (died 1578) of Merifield, Ilton, Somerset and Edge, Branscombe. North transept, Branscombe Church, Devon

John V Wadham (died 1578), 2nd son and eventual heir, who is chiefly remembered for having been the father of Nicholas Wadham (1531/2–1609), co-founder Wadham College, Oxford and for the surviving mural monument to his wife in Branscombe Church on which appears his effigy and armorials. He married Joan Tregarthin (died 1583), a daughter and co-heiress of John Tregarthin of Cornwall and widow of John Kelloway of Cullompton, Devon.

==== Nicholas II Wadham (1531/2–1609) ====
- Nicholas II Wadham (1531/2–1609), eldest son and heir, co-founder with his wife Dorothy Petre of Wadham College, Oxford. He died without progeny when his heirs became the descendants of his three sisters:
  - Joan Wadham, first married Sir Giles Strangways (1528–1562), of Melbury Sampford, Dorset, five times MP for Dorset in 1553, 1554, 1555, 1558 and 1559, and was thus ancestor of the Fox-Strangways Earls of Ilchester. She married secondly Sir John Young (died 1589) of the Great House Bristol and is buried in a magnificent altar tomb at the entrance of Bristol Cathedral dedicated to herself, both husbands and her children by them.
  - Margaret Wadham, wife of Nicholas Martin (died 1595) of Athelhampton Hall, Dorset. The couple's monumental brass, showing them kneeling beneath an escutcheon with the ancient arms of FitzMartin (Argent, two bars gules) impaling Wadham, survives in St Mary's Church, Puddletown, Dorset. Nicholas Martyn, in full armour, kneels bare-headed before an altar on which is an open book. His three sons, who all predeceased him, kneel behind him. To the right is his wife Margaret Wadham, behind whom kneel their seven daughters, of whom four survived as co-heiresses.
  - Florence Wadham (died 1596), wife of Sir John Wyndham (died 1572) of Orchard Wyndham, Watchet, in Somerset, and mother of Sir John Wyndham (1558–1645), ancestor of the Wyndham Earls of Egremont of Petworth House in Sussex.

=== Fox-Strangways ===
The estate of Wadham and much of the manor of Knowstone was held in the 19th century by the Fox-Strangways family, Earls of Ilchester, co-heirs of the last in the main line of the Wadham family. In Billings Directory of Devon, 1857, the Earl of Ilchester is listed as one of the three principal landowners in the parish of Knowstone and similarly in John Marius Wilson's Imperial Gazetteer of England and Wales, 1870–72. The long-term tenant of Wadham under the Earls of Ilchester was a junior branch of the Courtenay family of the adjoining manor of Molland. These holdings were sold in the early 20th century.
