= Neil Loring =

English soldier and diplomat

Sir Neil Loring KG
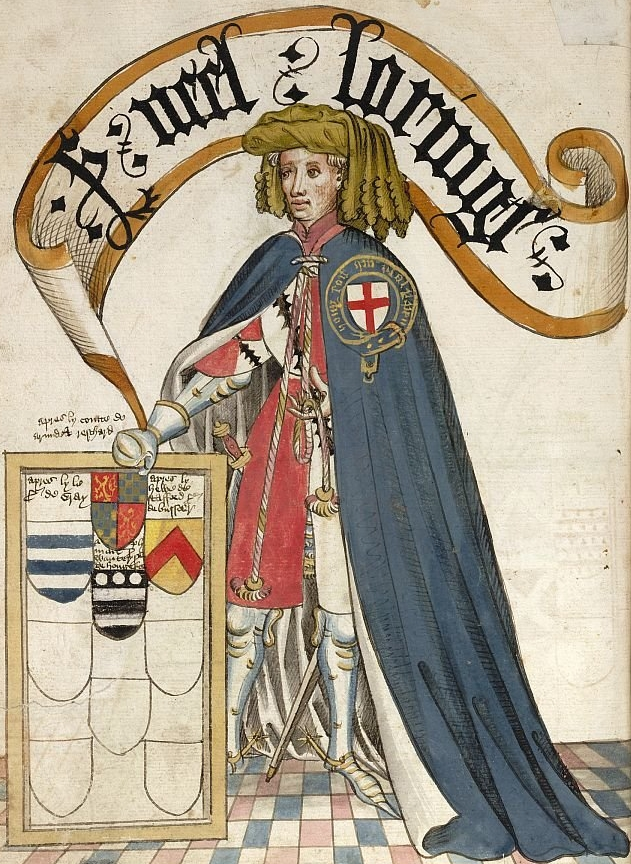
- Illustration from the 1430 Bruges Garter Book made by William Bruges (1375–1450), first Garter King of Arms
- Born: c. 1320; Chalgrave, England
- Died: 18 March 1386; Chalgrave, England
- Wars and battles: Hundred Years' War; Battle of Sluys; Battle of Poitiers; Castilian Civil War; Battle of Nájera

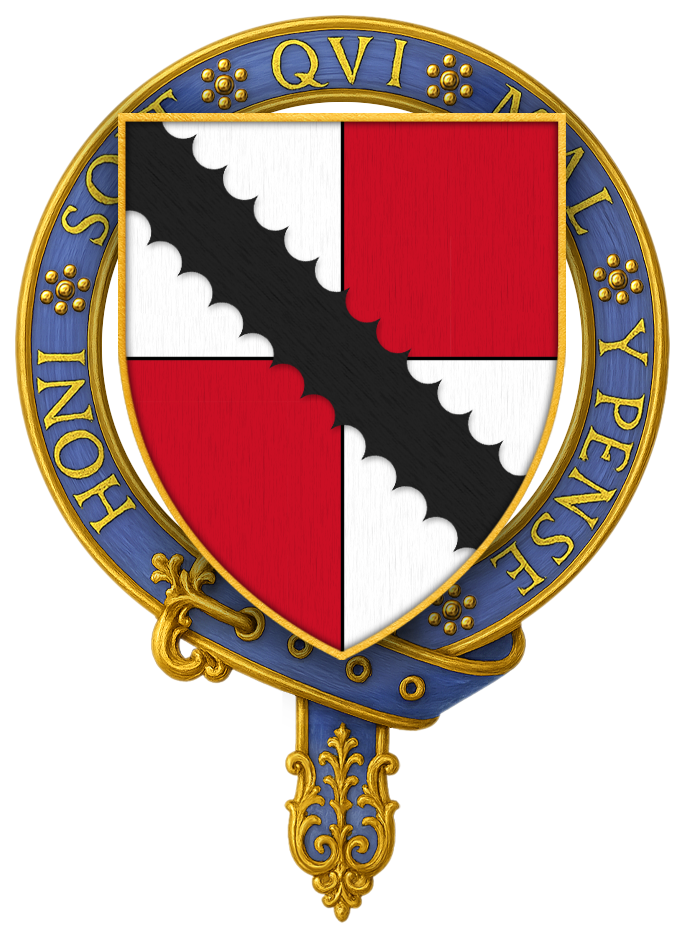
Arms of Sir Neil Loring

Sir Neil Loring, KG (also "Neel", "Nele", "Nigel", "Loryng", "Loringe"; Latin: Nigellus; (c. 1320 – 18 March 1386) was a medieval English soldier and diplomat and a founding member of the Order of the Garter, established by King Edward III in 1348. The central character in two historical novels by Sir Arthur Conan Doyle, Sir Nigel and The White Company, is loosely based on Neil Loring.

== Origins ==
He was born in Chalgrave, Bedfordshire, the son of Roger Loring by his wife Cassandra Perrott.

== Career ==
Loring fought at the Battle of Sluys in 1340, following which he was knighted for his bravery and awarded a pension of £20 a year. In 1347 he was with King Edward III during the Siege of Calais, and the following year was invested as one of the founding Knights of the Garter. By 1351 Loring was chamberlain to the Prince of Wales, and a member of his council. He accompanied the prince to Aquitaine in 1353, and distinguished himself in the Poitiers Campaign, during which he was "appointed to be in attendance on the prince's person". He was sent back to England after the Battle of Poitiers on 19 September 1356 to report news of the English victory. For his service to the prince he was given an annual pension of £83 6s 8d for life as well as lands in Wales.

In November 1359 Loring was back in France accompanying Edward III on his military campaign that resulted in the Treaty of Brétigny, signed on 25 May 1360. He was appointed a guardian of the truce and one of the commissioners responsible for overseeing the transfer of lands as agreed in the treaty. Loring was with the Prince of Wales in Aquitaine in 1366, and fought in the prince's division at the Battle of Nájera on 3 April 1367. In 1369 he served under Sir Robert Knolles at the Siege of Domme, and the following year in Poitou, under the Earl of Pembroke.

== Later life ==
Loring spent his latter days in retirement at his ancestral home in Chalgrave, where in 1365 he had received a royal licence to enclose a park. He died on 18 March 1386, and according to Leland was buried in the Church of the Black Canons at Dunstable.

The central character of Sir Nigel Loring in two historical novels by Sir Arthur Conan Doyle – Sir Nigel and The White Company – is loosely based on Neil Loring.

== Benefactions ==
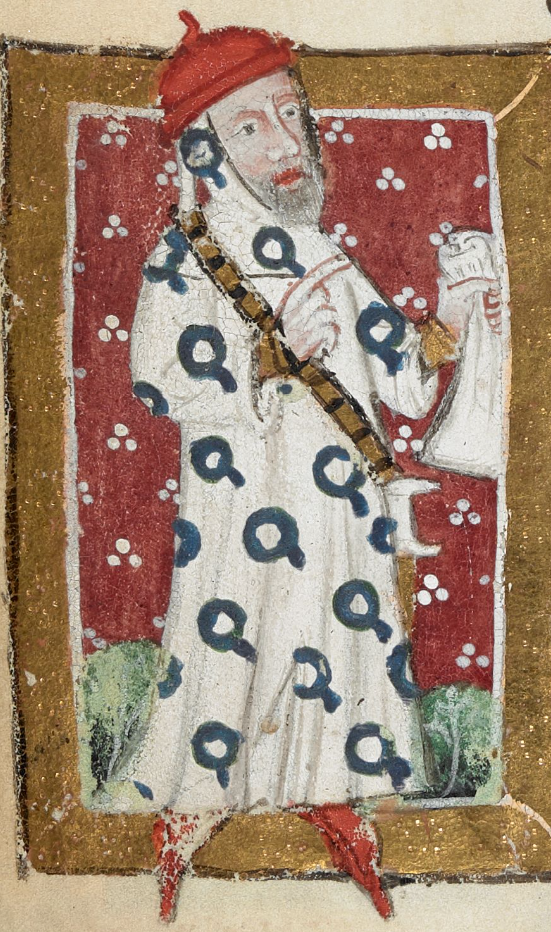
Neil Loring in the original robe of Order of the Garter (14th century), depicted as giving alms to St Albans Cathedral

Loring was the founder of a chantry in Chalgrave church. In the list of Benefactors to St. Albans Abbey, Sir Nigel is introduced as the donor of 10 marks and depicted as an old man with a red cap or hood on his head, wearing red shoes, covered with a white robe powdered with Garters, and holding a purse in his left hand.

== Marriage and children ==
He married Margaret de Beaupel, the daughter, and apparently the heiress, of Ralph de Beaupel whose home was the sub-manor of Beaupel, in the parish of Knowstone, North Devon. There exists today about 1 mile SW of Knowstone village the still-important farmhouse called "Beaple's Barton", bordered to the south by Beaple's Moor and to the north by Beaple's Wood. He appears in ancient records as "Nele Loring of Knowston-Beaupell". By marriage he also came to hold the manor of Landkey, 2 miles east of Barnstaple and 16 miles west of Knowstone. They had two daughters and co-heiresses:

- Isabel Loring (died 21 August 1400) who married twice:
  - Firstly at some time before 1382, as his second wife, to Sir William Cogan, feudal baron of Bampton. They had the following children:
    - John Cogan (died 1382), who died as a minor in the wardship of the king. His heiress was his sister Elizabeth Cogan.
    - Elizabeth Cogan, heiress of her brother John Cogan (died 1382), the wife of Fulk IX FitzWarin, 5th Baron FitzWarin (1362–1391), who from his mother Margaret Audley, 3rd daughter and co-heiress of James Audley, 2nd Baron Audley (died 1386), feudal baron of Barnstaple, Devon, was the heir to the manor of Tawstock, Devon, which had become the later seat of the feudal barons of Barnstaple. her second husband was Hugh Courtenay (died 1425).
  - Secondly, in about 1383, to Robert Harington, 3rd Baron Harington (1356–1406) of Gleaston Castle in the manor of Aldingham in Furness, Lancashire. Isabel's eldest son by her second marriage was John Harington, 4th Baron Harington (1384–1418), whose alabaster effigy exists in the Church of St Dubricius, Porlock, Somerset. Her second son was William Harington, 5th Baron Harington (1390–1458), who succeeded his childless elder brother in the title, married Margaret Hill but died without male children.
- Margaret Loring, the wife of Thomas Pevyre of Bedfordshire by whom she had children.
