= John Harington, 4th Baron Harington =

John Harington, 4th Baron Harington (1384 – 11 April 1418) was an English nobleman who inherited the title of Baron Harington of Aldingham in Furness, Lancashire. He was the son of Robert Harington, 3rd Baron Harington and Isabella Loring, daughter and co-heiress of Sir Neil Loring.

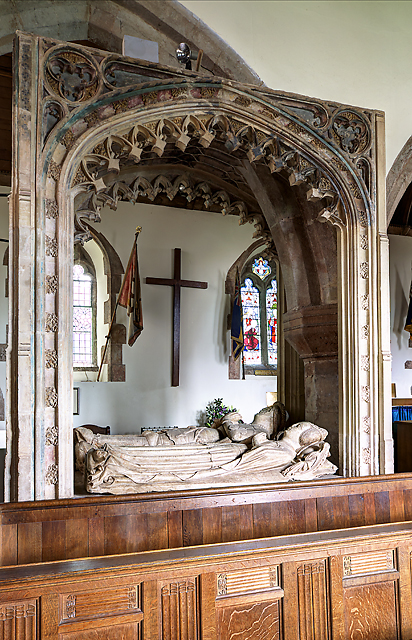
Monument to the 4th Baron Harington and his wife, Porlock church.

John Harington was married to Lady Elizabeth de Courtenay, daughter of Edward de Courtenay, Earl of Devon, and was said to be in much favour with King Henry V of England (1413–1422). He accompanied the King on his first expedition to France in 1415 with a varied company listed at 25 men-at-arms, 11 men-at-arms and 20 archers, and 32 men-at-arms and 76 archers.

He returned to France for a second expedition in 1417, serving under Humphrey, Duke of Gloucester with a company of 86 archers and 29 men-at-arms, but he died on 11 February 1418 of causes unknown during the course of the campaign. Before he left England, he made a will dated 8 June 1417. In it, he directed that two priests be appointed "to celebrate divine service and to pray for the souls of my father and mother and all my ancestors". This led to the foundation of the Harington Chantry, for in that year a royal licence was granted by King Henry V for the foundation of a chantry "at the altar in the Chapel of the Blessed Mary", which was the altar in the south aisle of St. Dubricius Church and which is still called the Lady Chapel. However, no steps appear to have been undertaken to carry out his wishes until July 1474, about three years after the death of his wife Elizabeth.

His effigy lies in the Church of St Dubricius, Porlock in Somerset, alongside that of his wife. Although he died in 1418, his distinctive English-style plate armour can be dated closer to about 1440, and it displays some interesting transitional features.

Peerage of England
Preceded by Robert Harington	Baron Harington; 1406–1418	Succeeded by William Harington
