= Gleaston Castle =

14th-century enclosure castle near Gleaston, England

- Cumbria, England
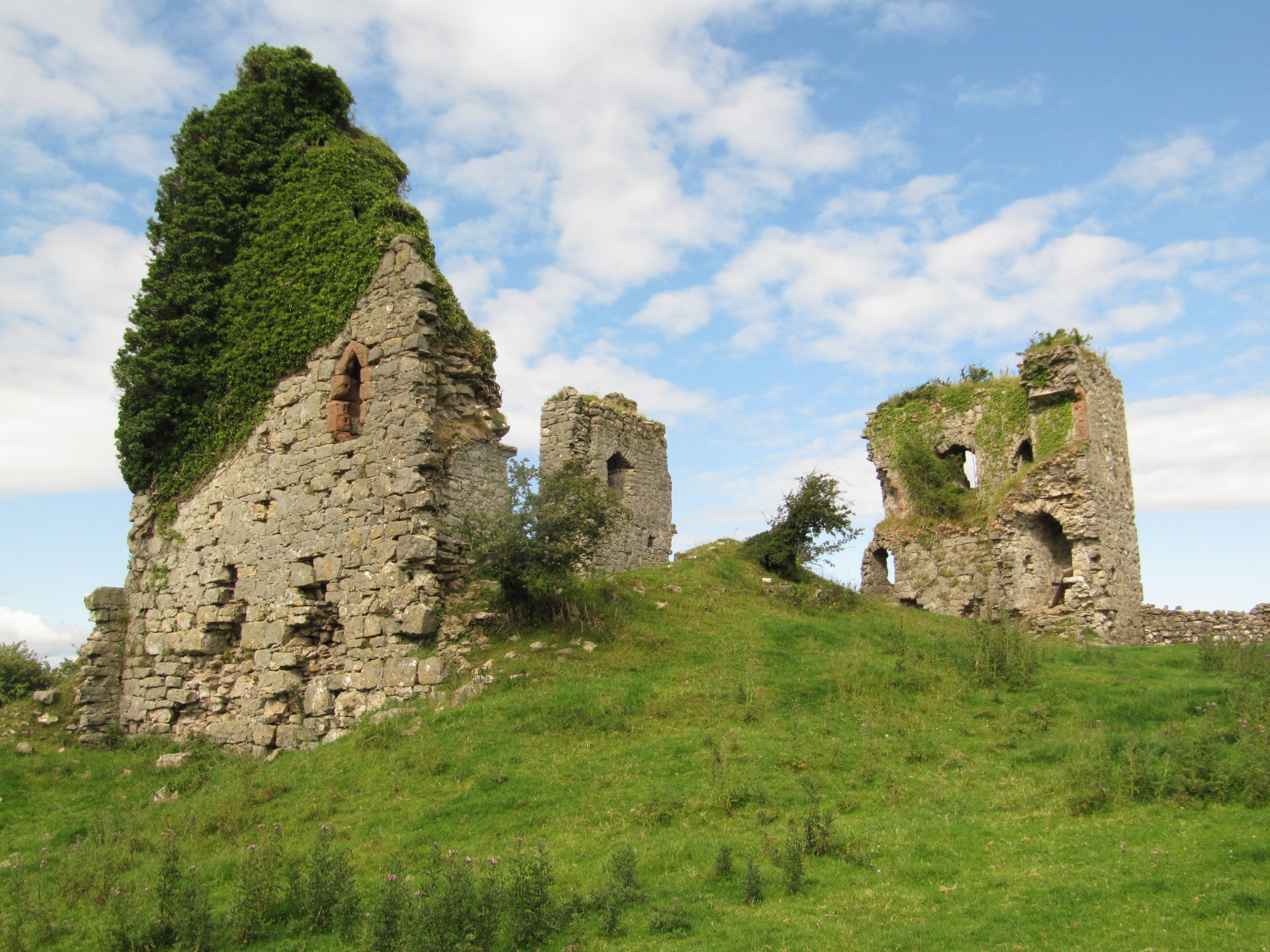
- Gleaston Castle's ruined north-west tower in 2015

Site information
- Type: Enclosure castle
- Owner: Private
- Open to the public: No
- Condition: Ruin – At Risk

Location
- Shown within Cumbria
- Location within Cumbria
- Coordinates: 54.1340°N 3.1317°W grid reference SD261714
- Height: c.19 m (62 ft) (south-west tower)

Site history
- Built: 14th century
- Built by: John Harington, 1st Baron Harington
- Materials: Limestone (main material) and sandstone (details)

Gleaston Castle is a medieval building in a valley about 1 kilometre (0.62 mi) north-east of the village of Gleaston. The village lies between the towns of Ulverston and Barrow-in-Furness in the Furness peninsula, Cumbria, England. Gleaston Castle has a quadrilateral plan, with a tower at each corner. The largest of these, the north-west tower, probably housed a hall.

The castle was most likely built for John Harington, 1st Baron Harington in the 14th century, replacing nearby Aldingham Motte. Gleaston Castle descended through the Harrington family until 1458 when it passed to William Bonville through marriage and was subsequently abandoned. The castle passed to the Grey family until Henry Grey, 1st Duke of Suffolk was executed for treason in 1554. As a result, Gleaston Castle became royal property before it was bought by the Preston family in the 17th century, and then passed to the Cavendish family.

As the castle was disused from the mid-15th century it fell into dilapidation, and antiquarian depictions from the 18th century show Gleaston in a state of ruin. Though it is not open to the public, it has been the subject of historical and archaeological investigation in the 20th and 21st centuries.

== History ==
From the 12th century the manor of Muchland was administered from Aldingham Castle. Muchland became known as Aldingham manor and in 1291 it came into the ownership of the Harrington family. In the 14th century, the Scots attacked the Furness peninsula during the Scottish Wars of Independence; around the same time coastal erosion threatened Aldingham Motte. These factors may have led to the Harrington family abandoning Aldingham and establishing the administrative centre of the manor at the newly built Gleaston Castle, though the construction work could have been the result of their growing social status, and they may have needed more room for a greater number of servants.

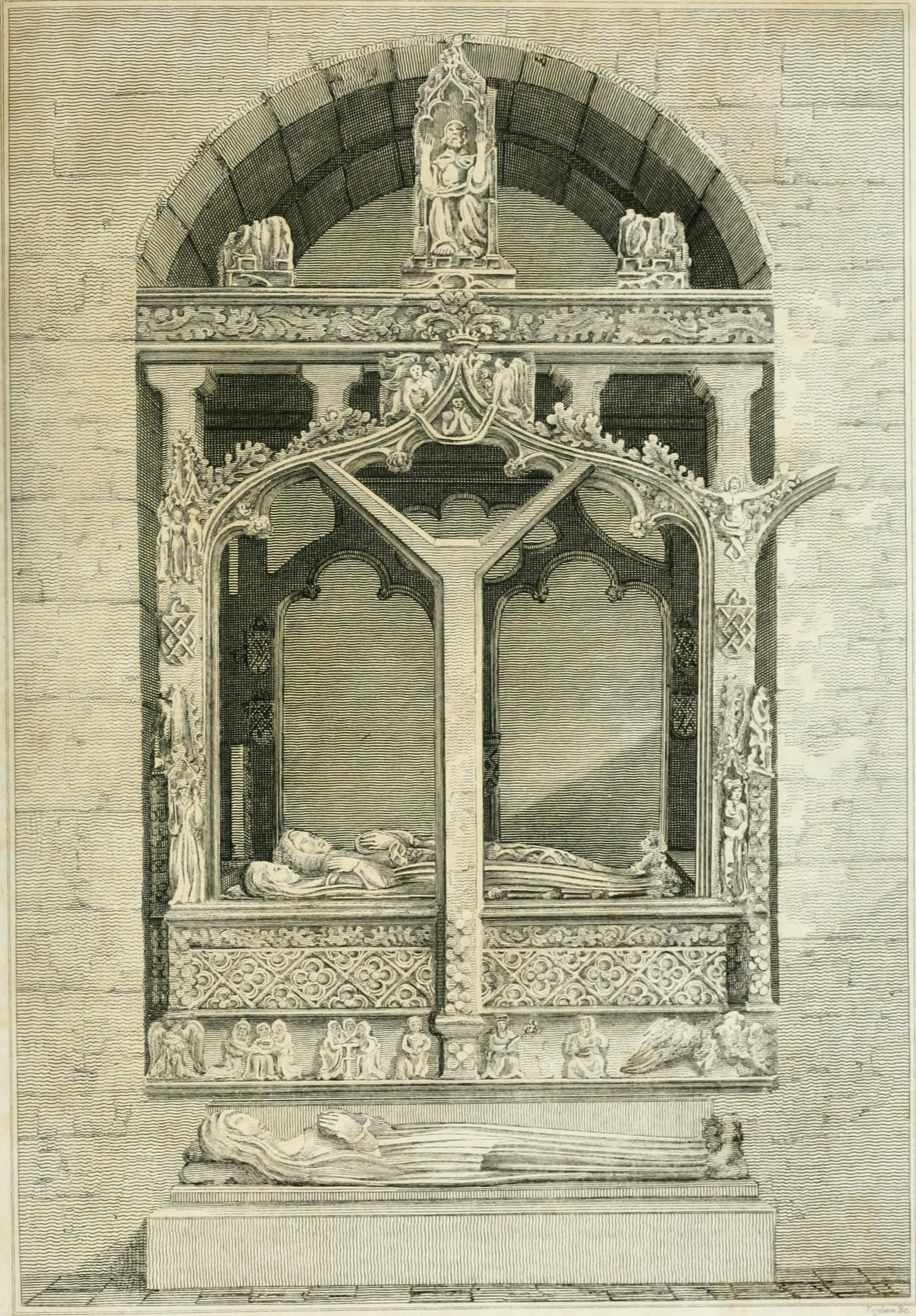
Funerary monument to John Harington, 1st Baron Harington in Cartmel Priory

The castle was probably built for John Harington, 1st Baron Harington (b. 1281–d. 1347). Gleaston Castle is first mentioned in 1389, although John Harington, 2nd Baron Harington is said to have died there in 1363. In 1415 John Harington was granted a papal indult for a private chapel and a portable altar for mass. It is likely, however, that the castle would have had its own chapel before this date.

The Harington family owned Gleaston Castle until William Harington, 5th Baron Harington died in 1458. The castle and barony then passed to William Bonville, 6th Baron Harington through marriage. He died in 1460 and the castle passed to Thomas Grey, 1st Marquess of Dorset, again through marriage. It is likely that around this time Gleaston Castle was abandoned. In 1540, the antiquarian John Leland noted "there is a ruine and waulles of a castell in Lancaster-shire cawlyd Gleston Castell sometyme longinge to Lord Harrington now to the Marquis of Dorset", and other antiquarians provided descriptions of the site.

When Henry Grey, 1st Duke of Suffolk was executed for treason in 1554 his property was taken over by the monarch. In 1671 Thomas Preston, 3rd Baronet Preston bought Aldingham manor which included Gleaston Castle. The property descended through the Prestons to the Cavendish family. The castle is now part of an active farm which dates from the 19th century. The farm buildings incorporate some of the fabric of the castle. The Prestons owned the castle until 1922 when it was sold to the current family of owners. According to a 1905 document from the Cumbria Archive Centre up to four human skeletons were discovered at the castle in the 19th century when the farm buildings were built.

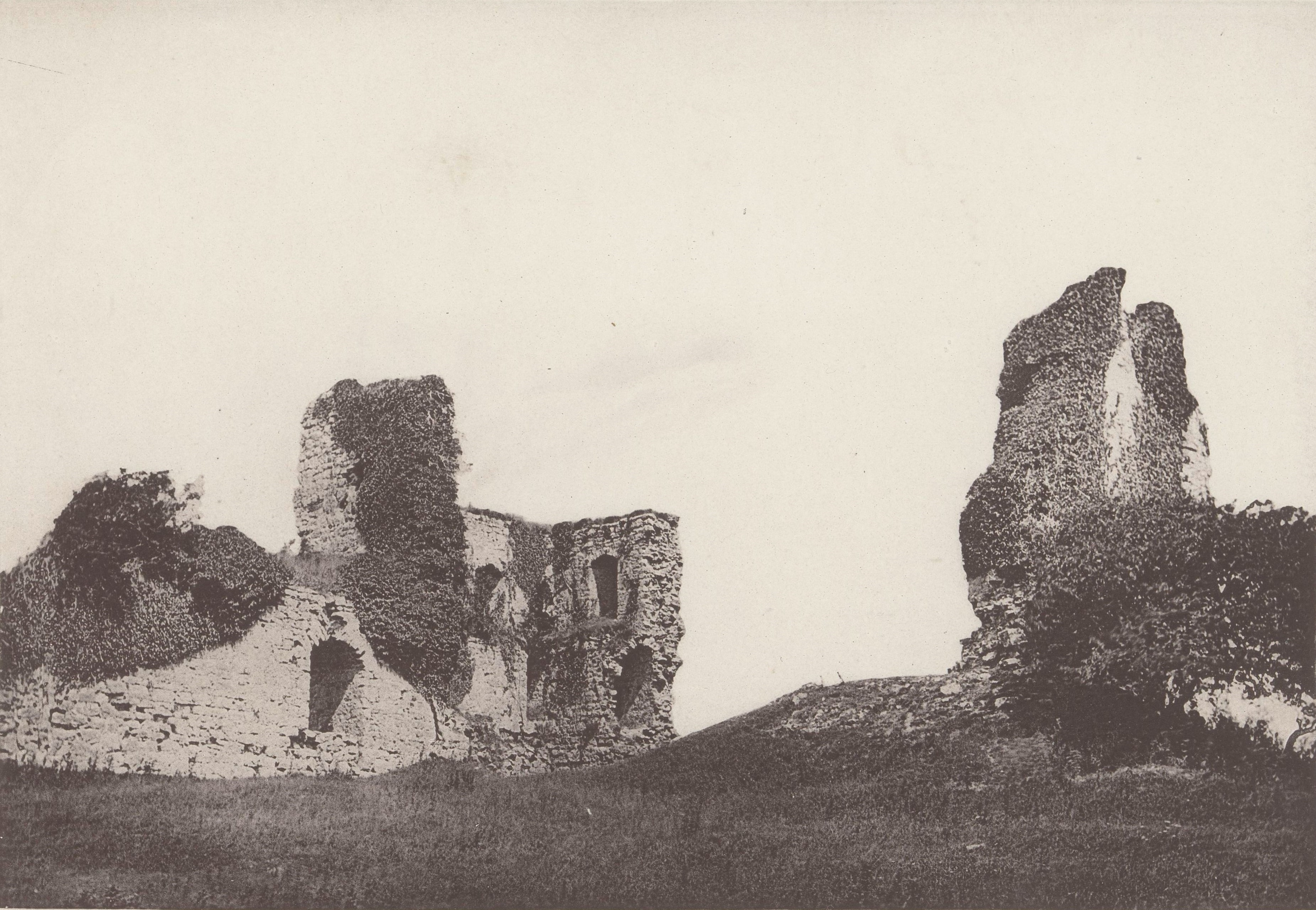
Gleaston Castle in the 1870s

An engraving by Samuel and Nathaniel Buck from 1727 is one of the earliest depictions of the castle, with later depictions from antiquarian William Close (1805), artist William Green (1809), and Edwin Waugh (1860). The Buck brother's engraving showed the castle in a state of ruin, and Waugh's depiction in particular shows that from the mid-19th century the castle has remained in a similar state of ruin until the present.

=== Preservation and investigation ===
Gleaston Castle is now a Grade I listed ruin, and a scheduled monument. The ruins can be viewed from the roadside, but it is unsafe to enter the castle due to its state of repair. As of 2021, the castle is on Historic England's Heritage At Risk register and its condition is described as "very bad" and at "immediate risk of further rapid deterioration or loss of fabric"; it has been on the list since at least 2016. Since the late 20th century there have been efforts to preserve the site: in 1998 the Lancaster University Archaeological Unit conducted an assessment of the standing building for further research and whether it would be possible to open the building to the public, but Historic England notes that "no agreement was reached regarding a scheme of consolidation"

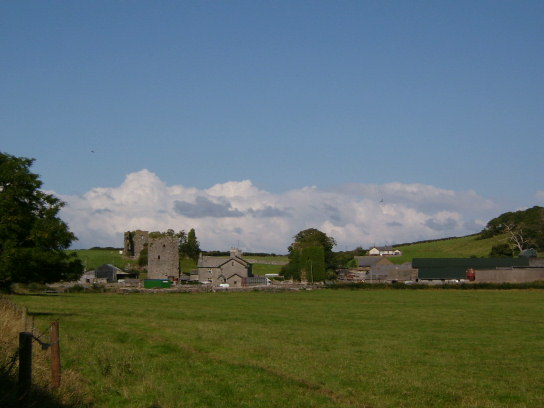
Gleaston Castle Farm (right) was built in the 19th century next to the castle (left).

The castle's precarious condition meant that the structure was not fully recorded until 2015, when the Morecambe Bay Partnership with funding from the Castle Studies Trust commissioned Greenlane Archaeology to carry out an aerial survey of the site. As well as producing a visual record of the castle from which elevations and plans could be derived, it identified features within the castle which could be buildings that no longer survive. In 2016 the University of Central Lancashire undertook a geophysical survey, using it as training for archaeology students and volunteers. The survey indicated there was formerly a garden to the north of the castle, and timber structures within the castle.

== Architecture and layout ==
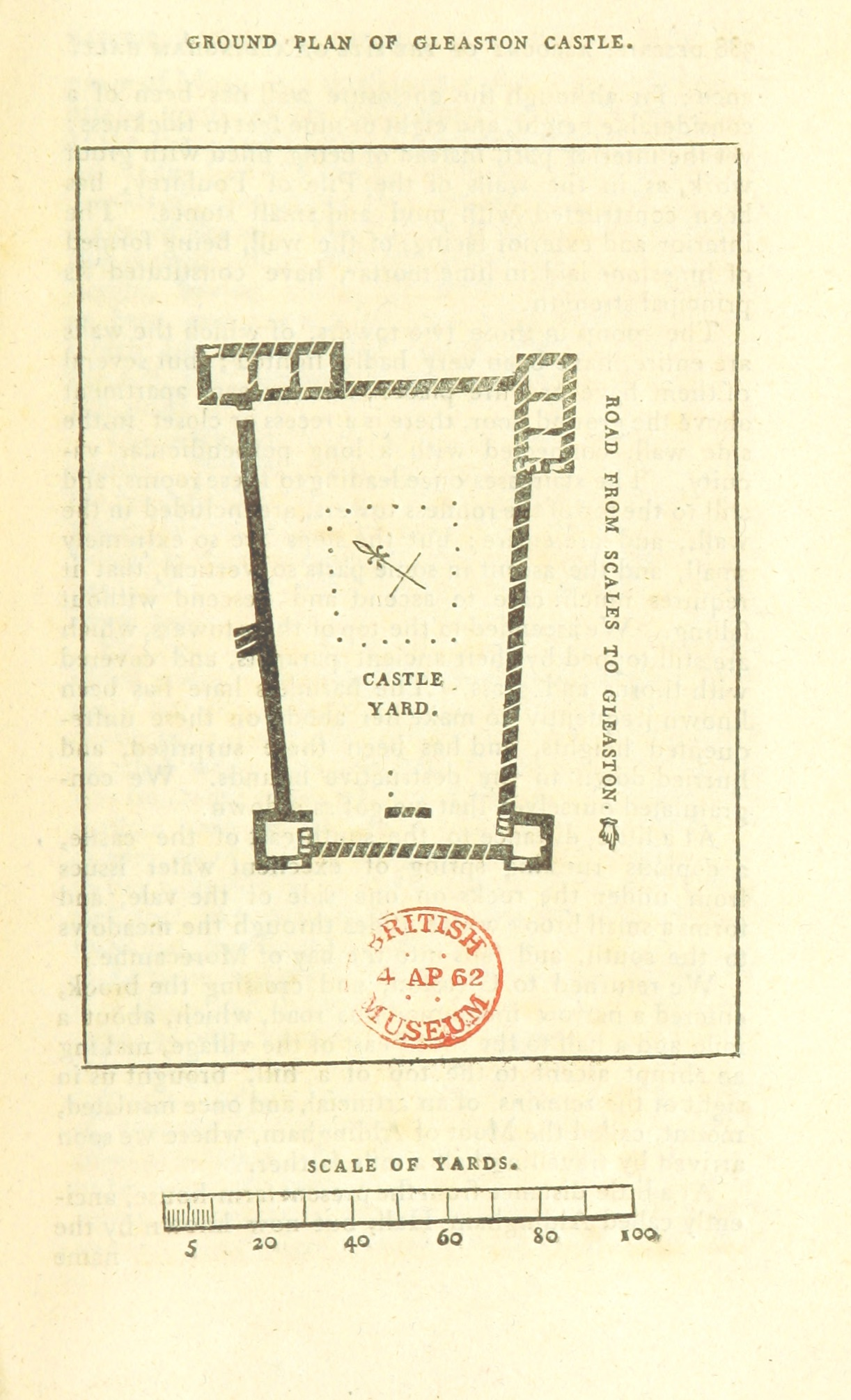
A plan of Gleaston Castle in 1774

Gleaston Castle was abandoned, perhaps around a century after its construction. As a result, the standing remains are an example of 14th-century architecture which has not been adapted by later occupation. The remains consist largely of limestone, which was quarried locally, while sandstone was used for doors and windows. The sandstone may have been recovered from a beach 2 miles (3.2 km) from the castle as there is no local source of sandstone. This method of using red sandstone for architectural details can also be seen at Piel Castle near Barrow-in-Furness.

The castle was a walled enclosure 73 metres (240 ft) long north and south, 37 metres (120 ft) wide at the south end and 46 metres (150 ft) wide at the north end. It had four corner towers, dressed with red sandstone. The north-west tower measures 26 by 16 m (85 by 52 ft) and is 12 metres (39 ft) tall at its highest point. It survives as three portions of standing masonry. The ground slopes, and is higher at the north end than the south. The south-west tower measures 10 by 9.4 m (33 by 31 ft), and the four-storey 19 m (62 ft) tall tower has a large vertical crack in the west wall. The south-east tower measures 9.5 by 13 m (31 by 43 ft) and survives to a height of 12 m (39 ft). The north-east tower is mostly collapsed, with earthworks, though some of it may survive in the modern farm buildings.

The western curtain wall is 3 metres (9.8 ft) thick, and in parts is 9 m (30 ft) tall. It has a ruined bastion midway between the north-west and south-west towers. To the east the wall has been partly incorporated into the modern farm buildings, preserving some of the masonry to a height of 4 m (13 ft) while in the north and south the wall no longer survives above ground.

== Landscape ==
Gleaston Castle is about 1 kilometre (0.62 mi) northwest of Gleaston village in the Furness Peninsula. John Harrington was given a licence to create a 600-acre (240 ha) park in Aldingham manor and, while its location is uncertain, it may have been east of the castle. It is likely that the manor's mill was also close to the castle, allowing the Harrington family to control an important local economic resource. According to Greenlane Archaeology, establishing how the castle related to the wider landscape has been identified as a future research priority.

== See also ==
- Castles in Great Britain and Ireland
- List of castles in England

== Bibliography ==
- Evans, Helen; Elsworth, Daniel (2016), Gleaston Castle, Gleaston, Cumbria: Results of Aerial Survey and Conservation Statement, Castle Studies Trust
- Farrer, William; Brownbill, J (1914), "The parish of Aldingham", A History of the County of Lancaster: Volume 8, Victoria County History, pp. 320–328
- Gibson, Leslie Irving (1977), Lancashire Castles and Towers, Dalesman Books
- Historic England (2016), Heritage at Risk: North West Register 2016 (PDF), Historic English Heritage, archived from the original (PDF) on 3 April 2017
- Historic England (2021), Gleaston Castle, Gleaston, Aldingham - South Lakeland
- Kendall, W. B. (1906), "Gleaston Castle", Transactions of the Cumberland and Westmorland Antiquarian and Archaeological Society, 6: 184–190, doi:10.5284/1064478
- Newman, Rachel (1986), "Piel Castle Survey and Excavations, 1983–1985" (PDF), Contrebis, 12: 64–67
