= John Harington, 1st Baron Harington =

English peer (1281–1347)

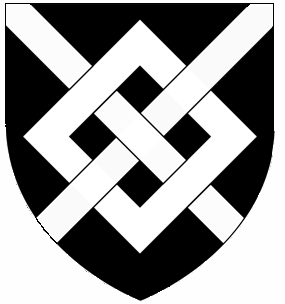
Arms of Harington: Sable, a fret argent; Crest: A lion's head erased or collared gules

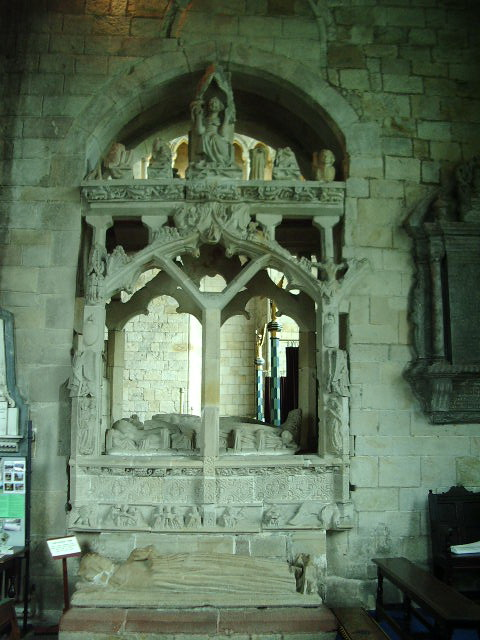
Monument and effigies of John Harington, 1st Baron Harington (died 1347) and his wife, Cartmel Priory. A 1646 drawing of it by Daniel King showed the arms of Dacre on the monument

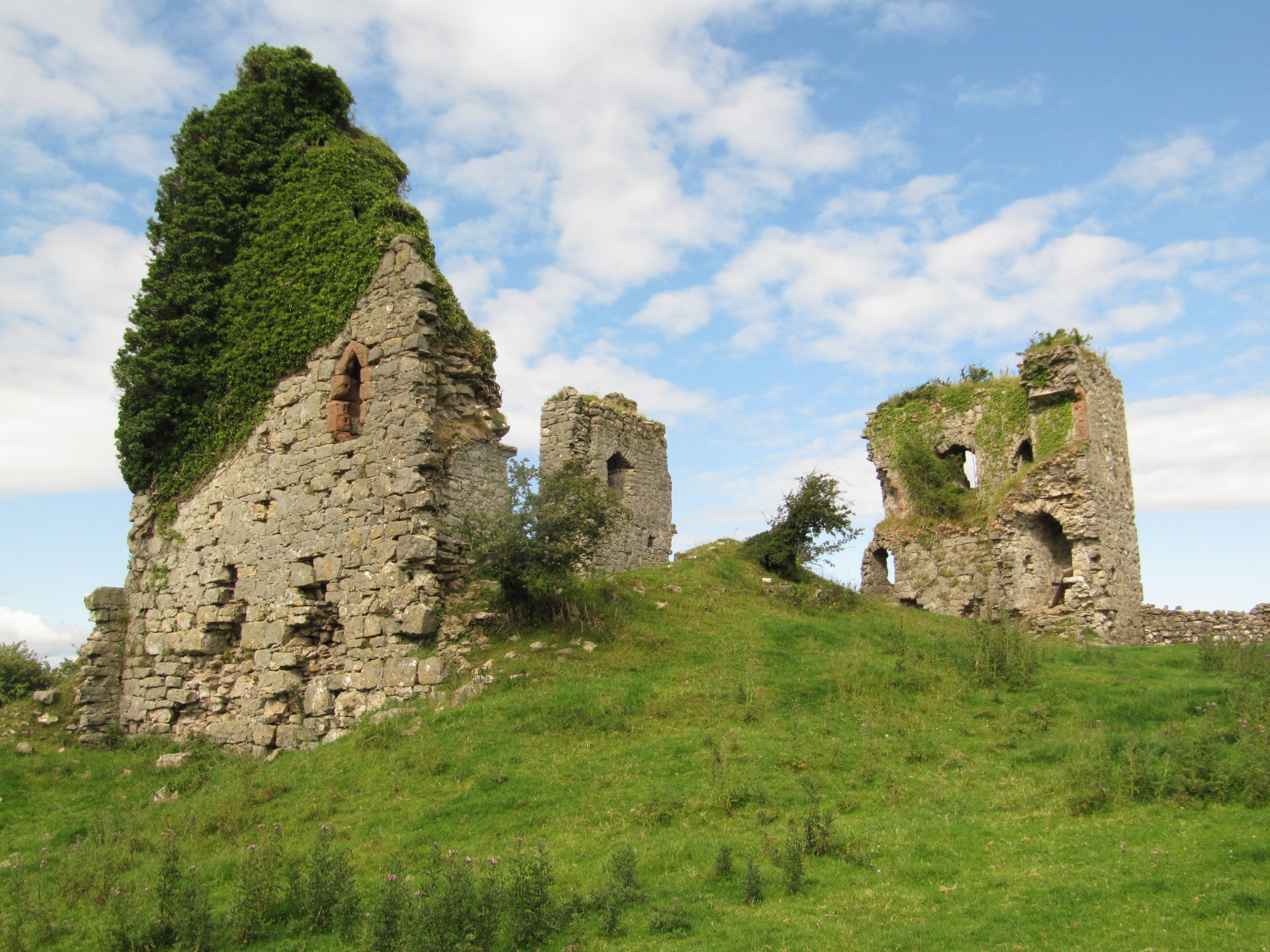
Harington built Gleaston Castle on the Furness Peninsula, replacing the family's castle at Aldingham Motte.

John Harington, 1st Baron Harington (1281–1347) of Aldingham in Furness, Lancashire, was an English peer, created Baron Harington by writ of summons to Parliament dated 1326.

== Origins ==
John Harington (alias de Haverington) and also spelt Harrington or Haryngton, was born in 1281 in Farleton, Melling, the son of Sir Robert de Haverington (died 1297), of Harrington in Cumbria, by his wife Agnes de Cansfield (died 1297), heiress of Aldingham in Furness, Cumbria. Agnes was the daughter and heiress of Richard de Cansfield by his wife Aline de Furness (alias de Fleming), heiress of Muchland (alias Michelland) in Furness, that is to say a moiety of the manor of Furness which had its caput at Aldingham. Muchland was held from the Abbot of Furness Abbey, who held the other moiety of Furness from the Earl of Lancaster. Harington was descended from Æthelred the Unready and his first wife Ælfgifu of York (daughter of Thored, Earl of Northumbria) by way of his mother, Agnes de Cansfield. Agnes was descended from Æthelred and Ælfgifu's daughter, also called Ælfgifu (Elgiva). Ælfgifu (Elgiva) had married Uchtred 'the Bold' Earl of Northumbria (Uhtred of Bamburgh) whose family ruled from Bamburgh castle on the Northumbrian coast.

== Career ==
He was a minor at his father's death in 1297 and between 1297 and 1302 he was in wardship to Sir William de Dacre. He was knighted on 22 May 1306 and was summoned to military service in October 1309 when he accompanied Edward, Prince of Wales on a trip to Scotland. Upon leaving the military in March 1335, he became involved with his local council and later became a member of English Parliament in 1326 until his death in 1347. He held the manors of Aldingham, Thurnham, and Ulverston in Lancashire and Witherslack and Hutton Roof in Westmorland, with further estates in Austwick and Harrington in Cumberland.

== Marriages and children ==
John married twice:

First to Margaret de Barlingham (died 1307) having issue:

- Sir Robert Harington (1305–1334), eldest son and heir apparent, knighted before 1331, who predeceased his father, having in about 1327 married Elizabeth de Multon (born 1306), daughter of Thomas de Multon and one of the three sisters and co-heiresses of John de Multon. She was the heiress of several estates including: Thurston in Suffolk; Moulton, Skirbeck and Fleet in Lincolnshire, of Egremont in Cumbria and of manors in County Limerick, Ireland. He left a son, heir to his grandfather John Harington, 2nd Baron Harington (1328–1363)
- John Harington (b.1307) John Harrington of Hornby. Margaret died during his birth. He formed the cadet branch of the Haringtons of Aldingham.

Secondly to Joan de Dacre (probably a member of the Dacre family of Naworth Castle), by whom he had one child:

- Joan Harington (b. 1330)

== Death and burial ==
He died on 2 June 1347 at Aldingham and was buried in Cartmel Priory, formerly in Lancashire, now in Cumbria, where survives his monument with effigies of himself and his wife.

Several of John Harrington's descendants include:

- Catherine Parr - Sixth and last wife of Henry VIII
- William Harrington (knight) - Official Standard Bearer of England and Henry V of England's standard-bearer at the Battle of Agincourt
- James Harrington (Yorkist knight) - Likely to have been Richard III of England's standard-bearer at the Battle of Bosworth Field
- Thomas Stanley, 1st Earl of Derby - Husband of Lady Margaret Beaufort and step-father of Henry VII of England
- Cuthbert Tunstall - Bishop of Durham
- Lady Jane Grey - Also known as Lady Jane Dudley after her marriage to Lord Guildford Dudley and as the "Nine Days' Queen". She was an English noblewoman who claimed the throne of England from 10 to 19 July 1553.

== Sources ==
- Cokayne, G. E. (1926). The Complete Peerage, or a history of the House of Lords and all its members from the earliest times (Gordon to Hustpierpoint). Vol. 6 (2nd ed.). London: The St Catherine Press. pp. 314–321.

Peerage of England
New title	Baron Harington ????-1347	Succeeded by John Harington, 2nd Baron Harington
