= Robert Harington, 3rd Baron Harington =

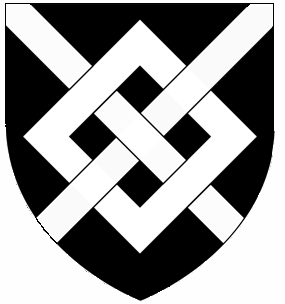
Arms of Harington: Sable, a fret argent; Crest: A lion's head erased or collared gules

Robert Harington, 3rd Baron Harington (1356–1406) of Gleaston Castle in the manor of Aldingham in Furness, Lancashire, was an English peer.

== Origins ==
He was born at Gleaston Hall in the manor of Aldingham, and was baptised at Aldingham. He was the son and heir of John Harington, 2nd Baron Harington (1328-1363) by his wife, whose name is not known, possibly she was Joan de Birmingham, his step-sister.

== Career ==
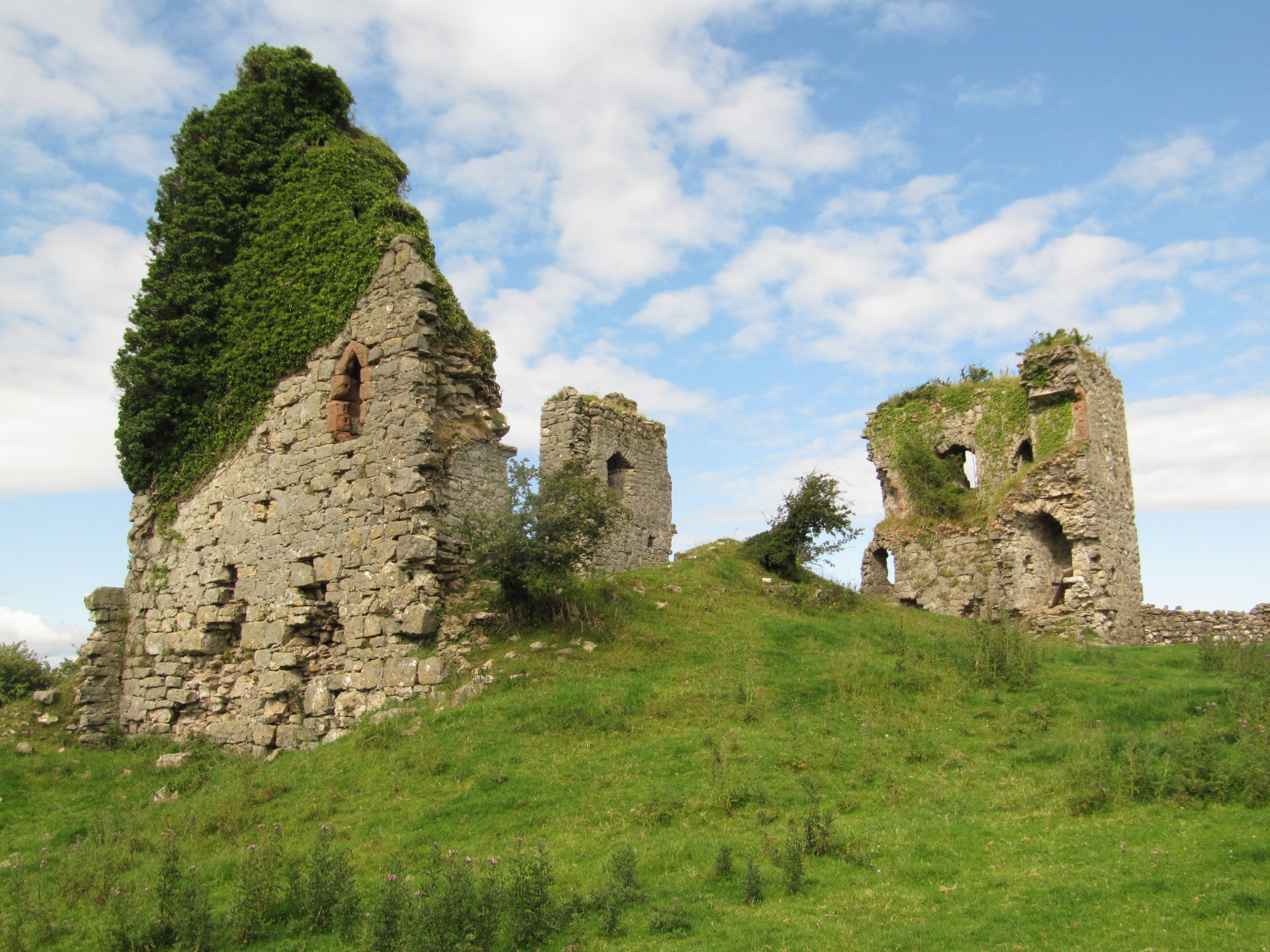
The remains of Gleaston Castle in 2015

His father died in 1363 when Robert was a minor aged 7, and he became a ward of King Edward III, who granted the custody of his paternal lands to his daughter Isabella of England (1332–1382), wife of Enguerrand VII, Lord of Coucy, 1st Earl of Bedford (1340–1397). He exited wardship having attained his majority of 21 and in 1377 was knighted at the coronation of King Richard II (1377-1399). He rebuilt his ancestral seat as a castle, recorded for the first time in 1389 as Gleaston Castle.

== Marriages and children ==
He married twice:

- Firstly in about 1376 to Alice de Greystoke, daughter of William de Greystoke, 2nd Baron Greystoke (1321-1359), of Greystoke, Cumbria, without children.
- Secondly in about 1383 he married Isabel Loring (d.1400) a daughter and co-heiress of Sir Nele Loring (d.1386), KG one of the founding Knights of the Garter, and widow of Sir William Cogan (d.1382), of Huntspill, Somerset, feudal baron of Bampton in Devon. Isabel was a great heiress of lands in Somerset, Devon and Cornwall, including the manor of Porlock in Somerset, which became a seat of her son and heir:
  - John Harington, 4th Baron Harington (1384–1418)

== Death ==
He died on 21 May 1406 at Aldingham.

== Sources ==
- Cokayne, G. E. (1926). The Complete Peerage, or a history of the House of Lords and all its members from the earliest times (Gordon to Hustpierpoint). Vol. 6 (2nd ed.). London: The St Catherine Press. pp. 314–16.

Peerage of England
Preceded by John Harington, 2nd Baron Harington	Baron Harington; 1363–1406	Succeeded by John Harington, 4th Baron Harington
