= Baron Harington =

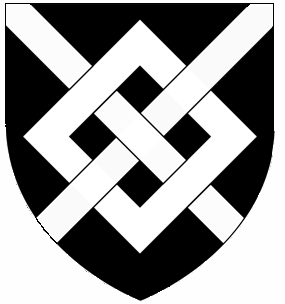
Arms of Harington: Sable, a fret argent; Crest: A lion's head erased or collared gules

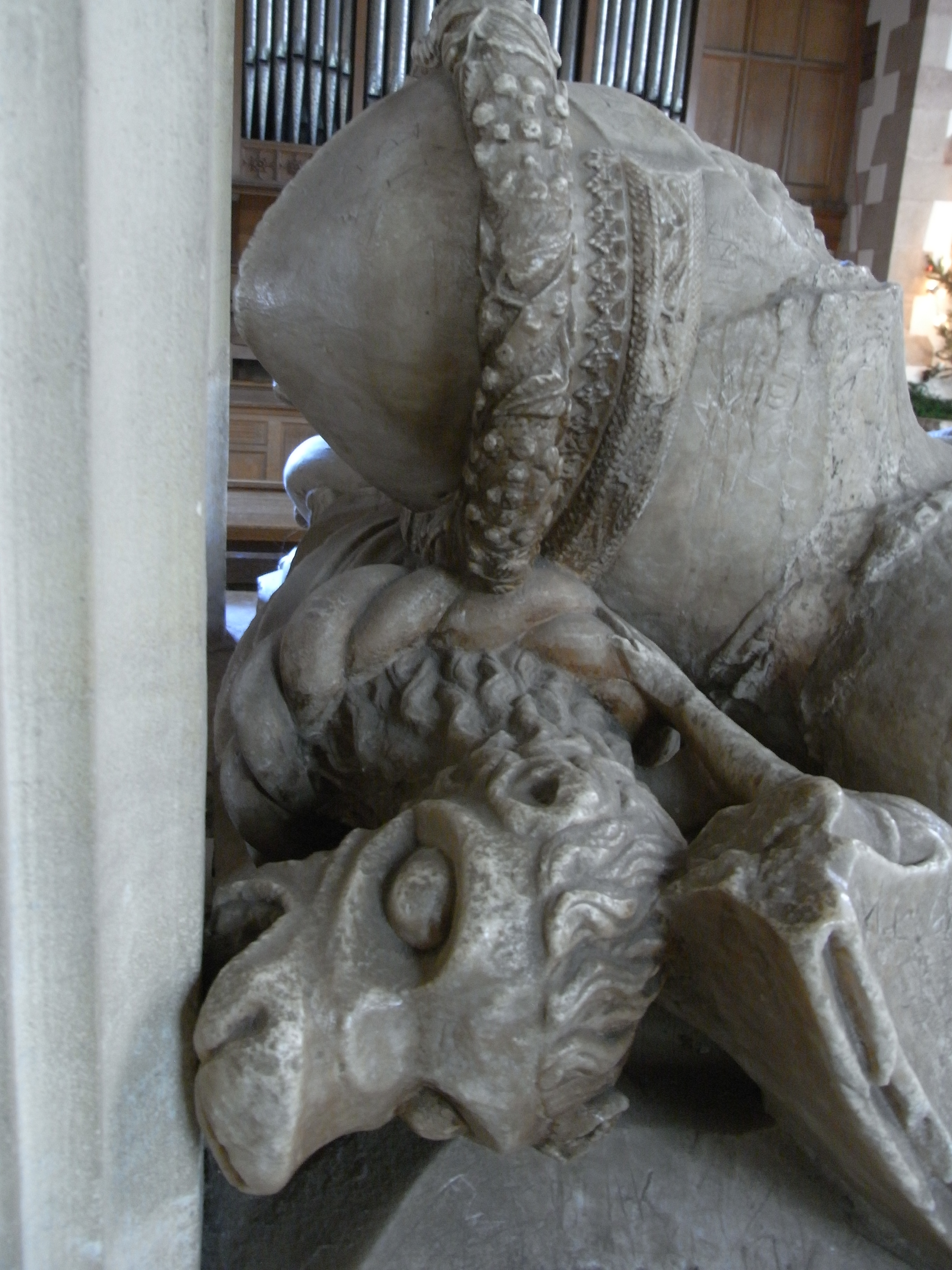
Crest of Harington, as sculpted on helmet of effigy of John Harington, 4th Baron Harington(d.1418), Porlock Church, Somerset: A lion's head erased or collared gules

Baron Harington, of Aldingham, was a title in the Peerage of England. On 30 December 1324 John Harington was summoned to parliament. On the death of the 5th baron in 1458, the barony was inherited by the heir to the barony of Bonville, with which title it merged in 1461, until both baronies were forfeited in 1554.

== Barons Harington (1324) ==
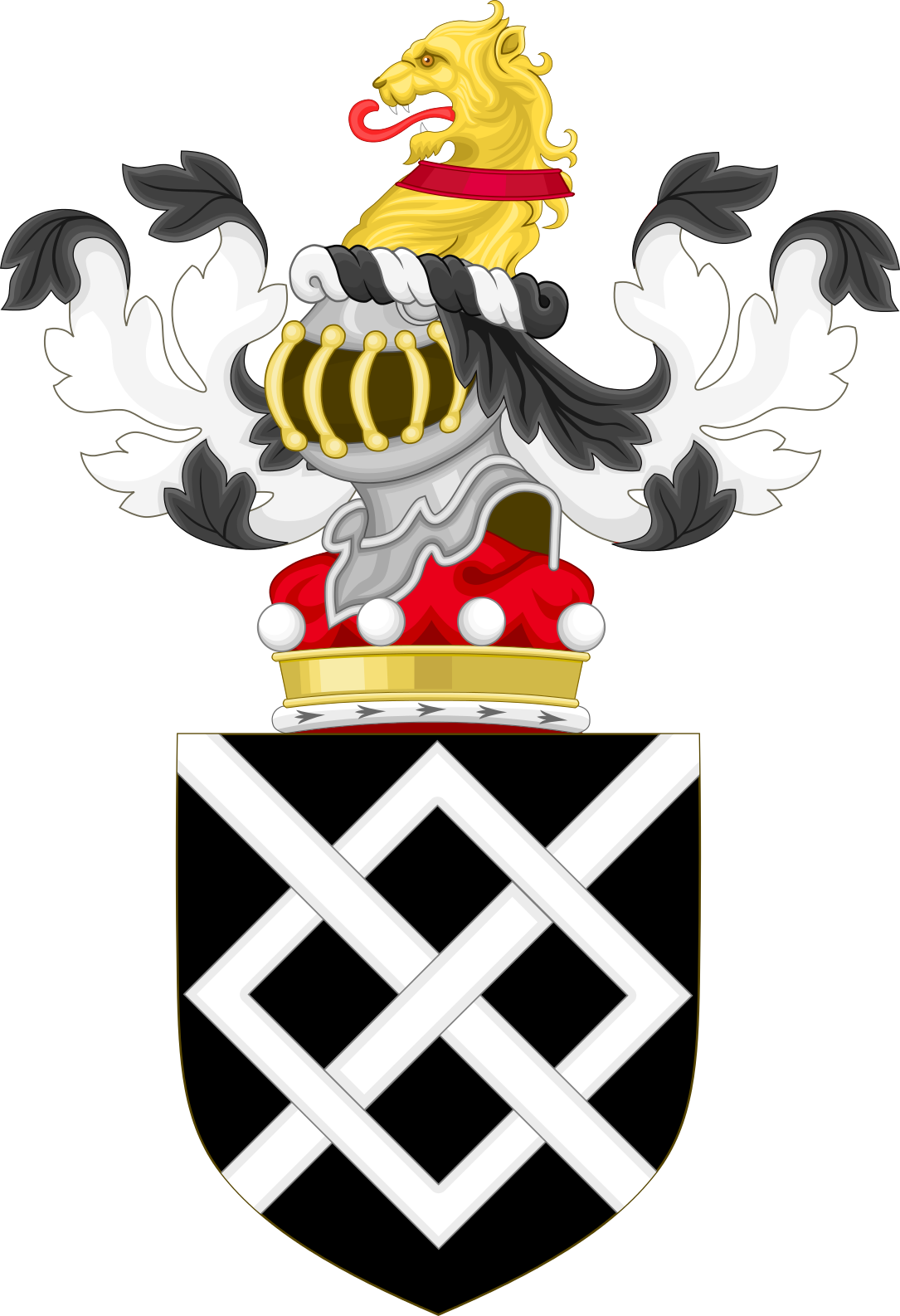
Coat of Arms of Barons Harington.

- John Harington, 1st Baron Harington (d. 1347)
- John Harington, 2nd Baron Harington (1328–1363)
- Robert Harington, 3rd Baron Harington (1356–1406)
- John Harington, 4th Baron Harington (1384–1418)
- William Harington, 5th Baron Harington (c.1394–1458)
- William Bonville, 6th Baron Harington (1442–1460)
- Cecily Grey, 2nd Baroness Bonville, 7th Baroness Harington (c.30 June 1460– 12 May 1529)
- For Further Barons see Baron Bonville and Marquess of Dorset.
