= William Harington, 5th Baron Harington =

English nobleman (c.1394–1458)

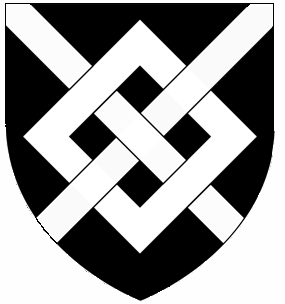
Arms of Harington: Sable, a fret argent; Crest: A lion's head erased or collared gules

William Harington (c.1394–1458) was an English nobleman who inherited the title of 5th Baron Harington of Aldingham, Lancashire. He was son of Robert Harington, 3rd Baron Harington, whose title he inherited in 1418 after the death of his older brother, John Harington, 4th Baron Harington. Lord Harington served in the 1452-53 Gascony campaign of the Hundred Years War under the leadership of "Old Talbot". He died without surviving sons, and so his title passed to the son of his daughter, William Bonville, 6th Baron Harington.
