= Preston baronets of Furness (1644) =

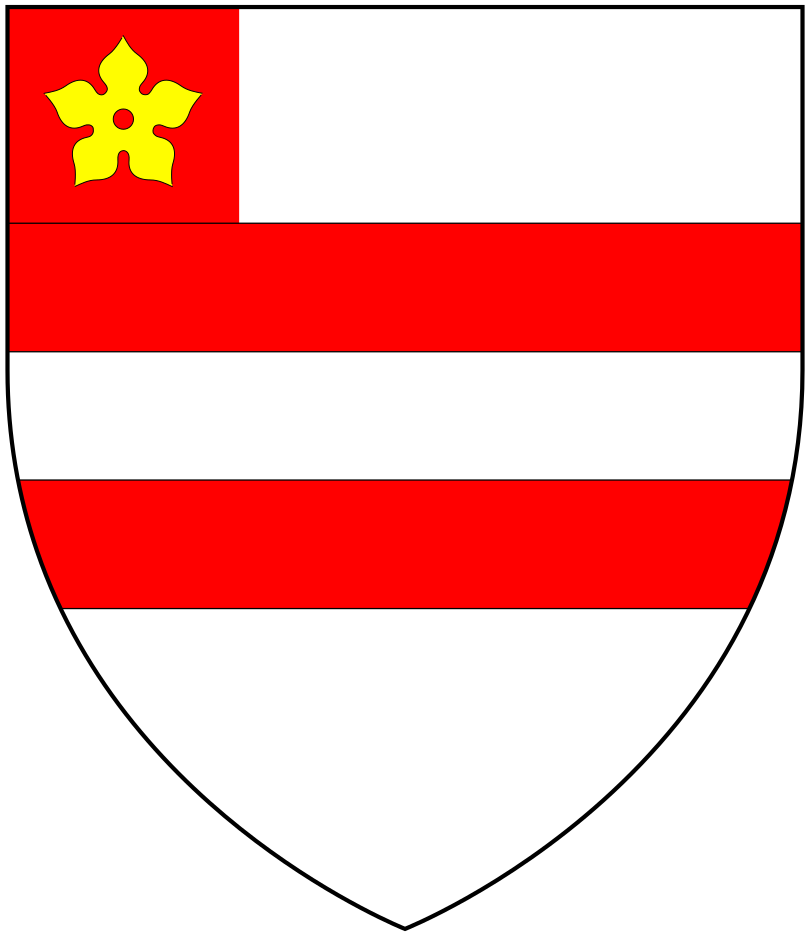
Escutcheon of the Preston baronets of Furness

The Preston baronetcy, of Furness in the County of Lancaster, was created in the Baronetage of England on 1 April 1644 for George Preston, son of John Preston (died c.1642) of Gray's Inn, and a Royalist of the English Civil War. He was descended from the de Preston family which during the reign of King Henry II (1154–1189) was seated at Preston Richard and Preston Patrick in Westmorland.

== Preston baronets, of Furness (1644) ==
- Sir John Preston, 1st Baronet (1617–1645)
- Sir John Preston, 2nd Baronet (died 1663)
- Sir Thomas Preston, 3rd Baronet (c. 1641–1709), a former Catholic priest who was survived by two daughters from his second marriage, to Mary, daughter of Caryll Molyneux, 3rd Viscount Molyneux. The baronetcy became extinct on his death.
