= John Harington, 2nd Baron Harington =

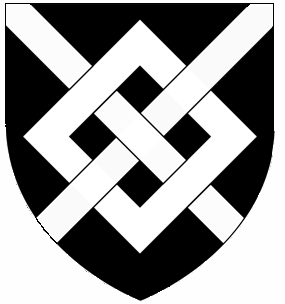
Arms of Harington: Sable, a fret argent; Crest: A lion's head erased or collared gules

John Harington, 2nd Baron Harington (1328–1363) of Aldingham in Furness, Cumbria, was an English peer, who inherited the title Baron Harington in 1347 on the death of his grandfather John Harington, 1st Baron Harington (1281–1347).

== Origins ==
He was the son of Sir Robert Harington (died 1334), who predeceased his own father the 1st Baron. His mother was Elizabeth de Multon (born 1306), daughter of Thomas de Multon and one of the three sisters and co-heiresses of John de Multon. She was the heiress of several estates including: Thurston in Suffolk; Moulton, Skirbeck and Fleet in Lincolnshire, of Egremont in Cumbria and of manors in County Limerick, Ireland. Elizabeth outlived her husband and in about 1334 remarried to Walter de Bermingham.

== Career ==
In 1353 he confirmed the agreement made by his grandfather with the Abbot of Furness Abbey, his feudal overlord at Aldingham. In 1355 he nominated an attorney to act for him in Ireland, where he had inherited lands in County Limerick from his mother. John Harington was granted a lease of the manor of Hornby by Henry of Grosmont, 1st Duke of Lancaster and also held the manors of Bolton-le-Moors, Chorley and Aighton. In 1358 he moved to London to take part in services for king Edward III.

== Marriage and children ==
The name of his wife is not known, possibly she was Joan de Birmingham, daughter of his step-father Walter de Birmingham. By his wife he had children including Robert Harington, 3rd Baron Harington (1356–1406).

== Death and burial ==
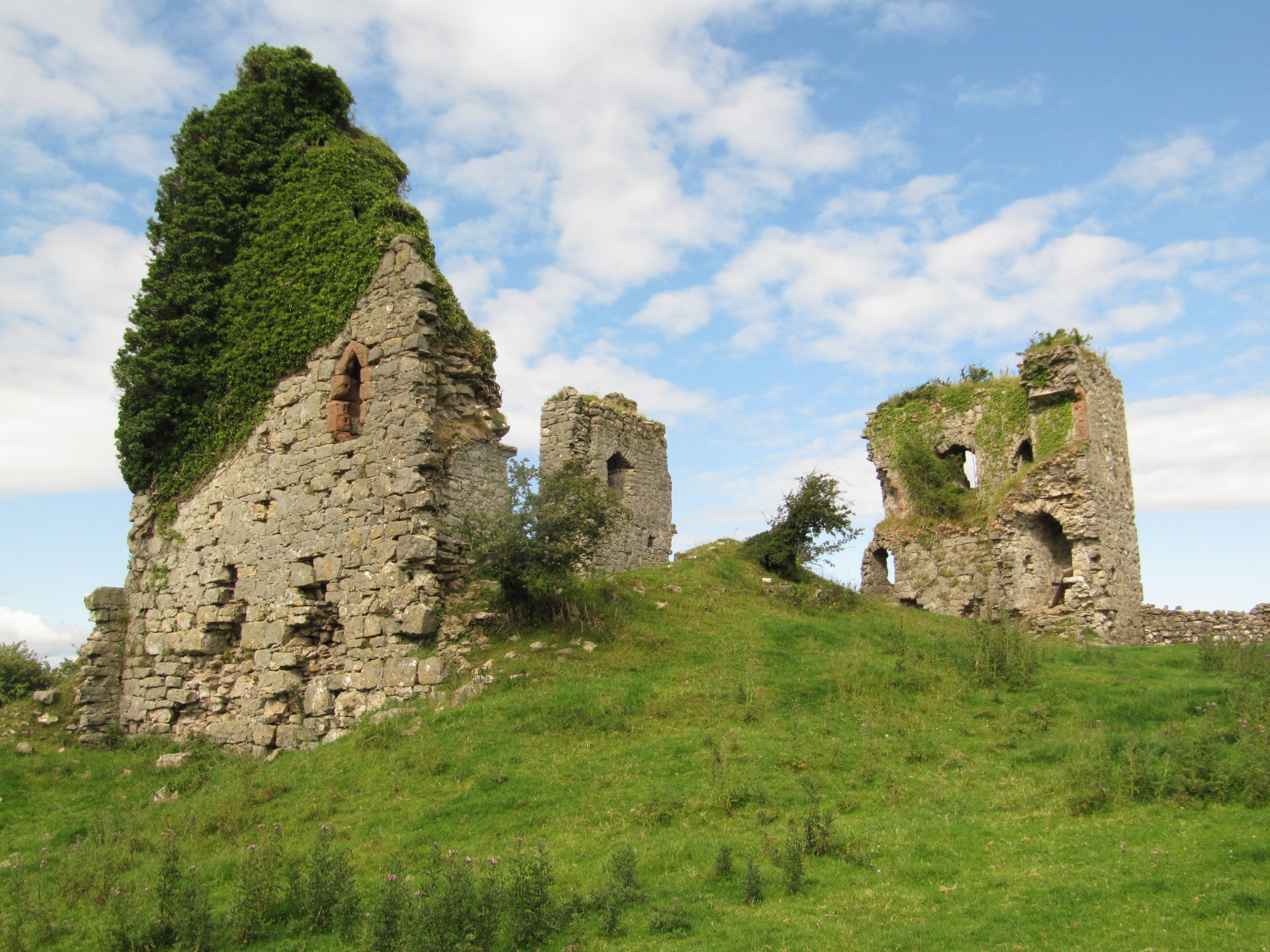
Gleaston Castle where Harrington died in 1363

He died on 28 May 1363 at his seat Gleaston Hall in the manor of Aldingham.

== Sources ==
- Cokayne, The Complete Peerage, new edition, Vol.6, pp. 314–321, Baron Harington, pp. 314–16, biography of John Harington, 1st Baron Harington

Peerage of England
Preceded by John Harington, 1st Baron Harington	Baron Harington; 1347–1363	Succeeded by Robert Harington, 3rd Baron Harington
