= Church of St Dubricius, Porlock =

Church in West Somerset, UK

Church of St Dubricius
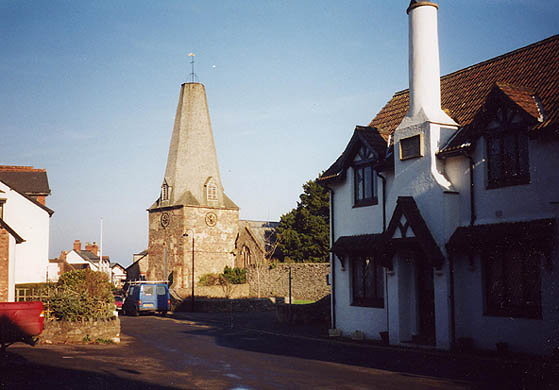

- Location within Somerset

General information
- Location: Porlock, England
- Coordinates: 51.2087°N 3.5955°W
- Completed: 13th century

Listed Building – Grade I
- Official name: Church of St Dubricius
- Designated: 22 May 1969
- Reference no.: 1173524

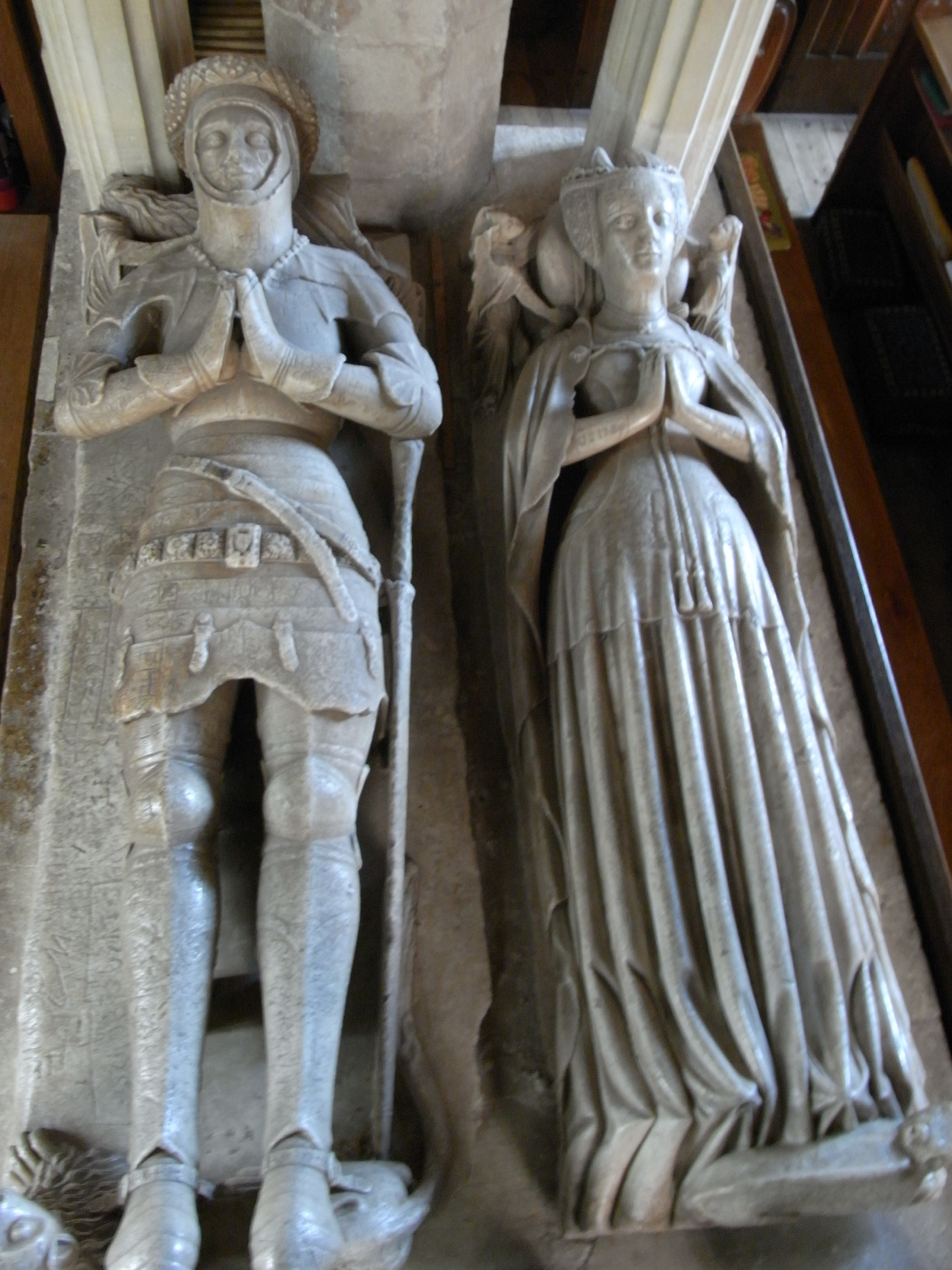
Alabaster effigies (c.1471) in Church of St Dubricius, Porlock, of John Harington, 4th Baron Harington (died 1418) and his wife Elizabeth Courtenay (died 1471), daughter of Edward de Courtenay, 3rd Earl of Devon (died 1419)

Drawing from 1890 of effigies in Church of St Dubricius, Porlock, of John Harington, 4th Baron Harington (died 1418) and his wife Elizabeth Courtenay (died 1471), daughter of Edward de Courtenay, 3rd Earl of Devon (died 1419)

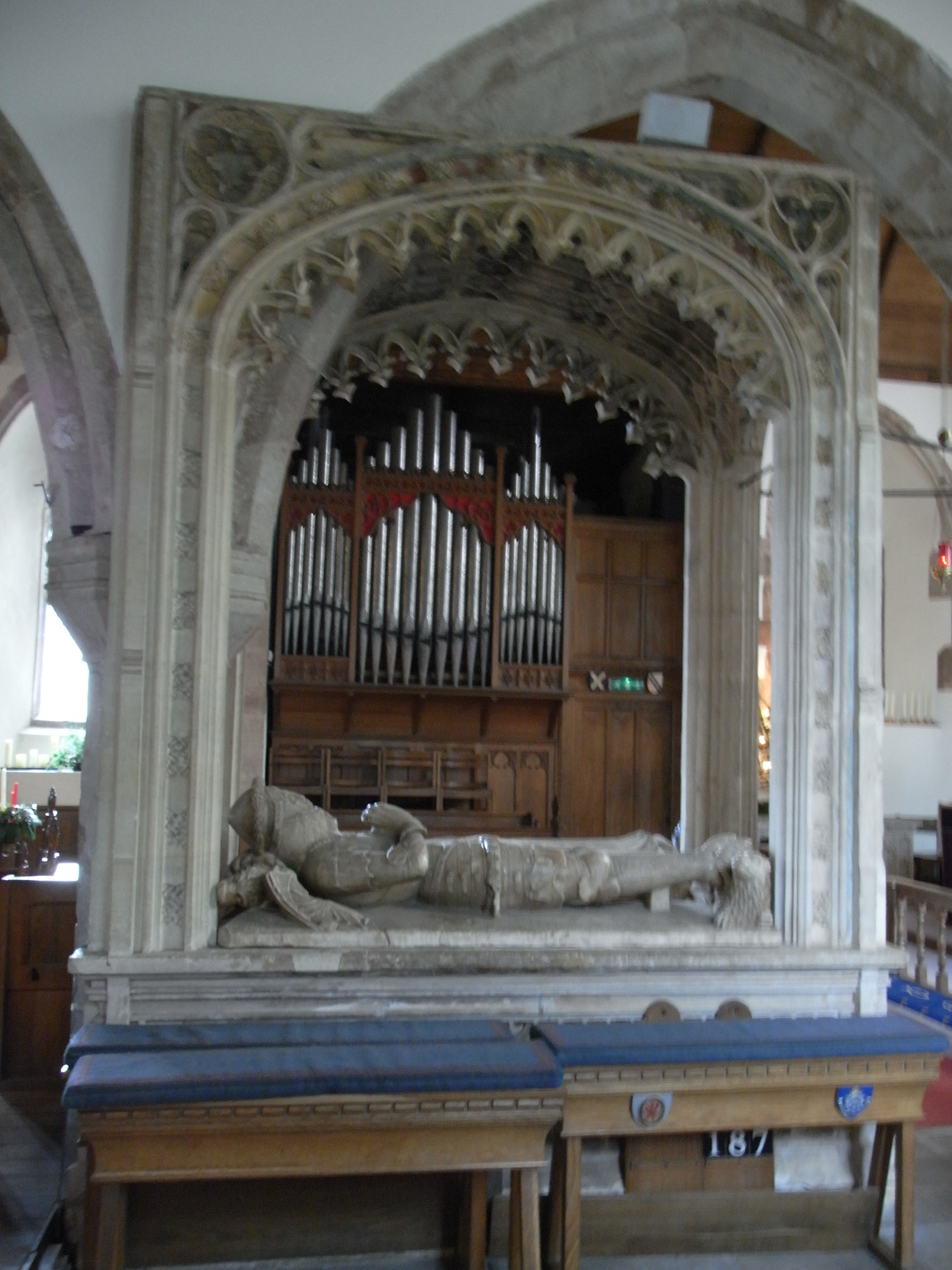
General view of Harington monument, viewed from south

The Church of St Dubricius in Porlock, Somerset, England dates from the 13th century. The church has been designated by English Heritage as a Grade I listed building.

The dedication is to Dubricius (also known in Welsh as Dyfrig and in corrupt Norman-French as Devereux) (c. 465 – 550 or 612), a 6th-century Briton ecclesiastic venerated as a saint, and may indicate he travelled to the area.

The church stands on the site of an earlier church that may have dated from around 1120. Restoration work was undertaken in the 15th century. The oak-framed spire - one of only a small number surviving in England - was damaged in a storm of 1703. Further restoration was undertaken between 1888 and 1891, with subsequent necessary repairs being fundraised for as of 2026.

Within the church is the very fine late 15th century alabaster tomb of John Harington, 4th Baron Harington (1384–1418) who fought alongside King Henry V in France in 1417, and his wife Elizabeth Courtenay (died 1471), daughter of Edward de Courtenay, 3rd Earl of Devon (died 1419). Elizabeth survived her first husband and married secondly William Bonville, 1st Baron Bonville (died 1461). The style of armour worn by Baron Harington is of the period c.1470, as was worn in the time of his widow's death, and is not therefore an accurate representation of the armour worn at the time of his death in 1418. The monument and effigies are believed to have been erected at the expense of Elizabeth's step-daughter the great heiress Cicely Bonville, Baroness Harington and Marchioness of Dorset (1460–1529), and are considered from their very high quality "more befitting a cathedral than a retired country church". At the back of the nave is a clock dating from the early 15th century which struck the tenor bell hourly. It has no hands or clock face. The clock was used until 1897 when a new clock was installed to celebrate Queen Victoria's jubilee.

The parish is part of the benefice of Porlock and Porlock Weir with Stoke Pero, Selworthy and Luccombe within the Exmoor deanery.

== See also ==
- Grade I listed buildings in West Somerset
- List of ecclesiastical parishes in the Diocese of Bath and Wells
