= Fivehead River =

River in south Somerset, England

Fivehead River River Earn, Rag River
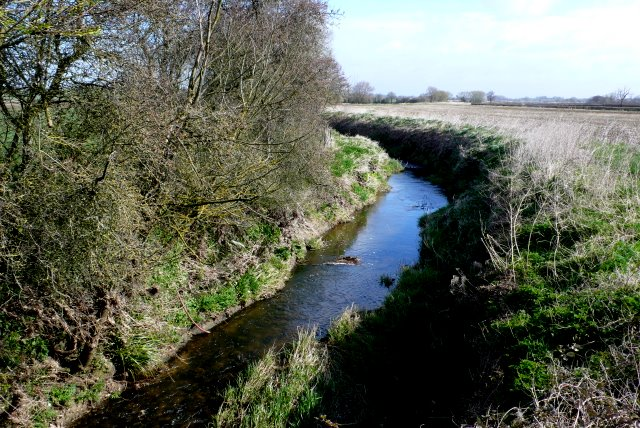

Location
- Country: England
- County: Somerset

Physical characteristics
- Source
  - location: Somerset, England
  - coordinates: 50°58′02″N 2°57′39″W
- Mouth: River Isle
  - location: Somerset, England
  - coordinates: 50°59′52″N 2°53′42″W

Fivehead River (also known as the River Earn or Rag or Ragg River) flows through south Somerset, England.

It is named after the village of Fivehead, near to two Sites of Special Scientific Interest at Fivehead Arable Fields and Fivehead Woods and Meadow.

The source of the river is from various streams around Batten's Green and Ashill south west of Staple Fitzpaine, and flows east past Hatch Beauchamp and Beercrocombe where it is joined by several small tributaries. It then flows north east, past Isle Abbots, joining the River Isle north of Isle Brewers.

The 18th century road bridge over the river is a Grade II listed building.
