= St Martin's Church, Fivehead =

Church in Somerset, England

Church of St Martin
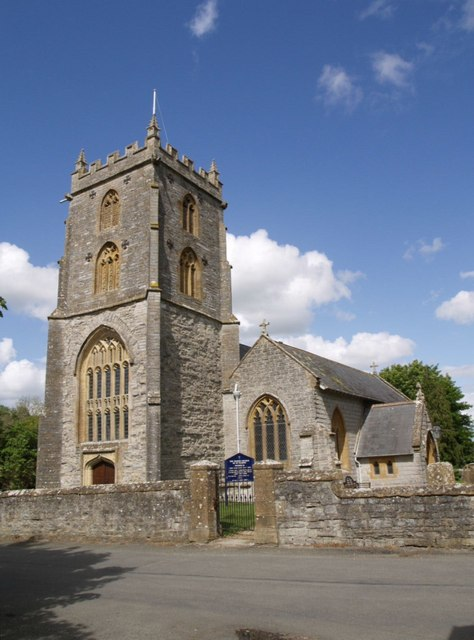

- Location within Somerset
- 51°00′06″N 2°55′22″W
- Location: Fivehead, Somerset, England

History
- Built: 13th century (700+ years ago)

Listed Building – Grade I
- Official name: Church of St Martin
- Designated: 17 April 1959
- Reference no.: 1249564

The Anglican Church of St Martin in Fivehead, Somerset, England dates from the 13th century and has been designated as a Grade I listed building.

The church built of Hamstone includes a three-bay nave, chancel, south aisle and porch, and a west tower.

The three-stage tower dates from around 1505. It is supported by diagonal buttresses and embellished with corner pinnacles and gargoyles. There are six bells the oldest of which was cast around 1500.

Within the church is a palimpsest depicting Jane Seymour. There was a gallery at the back of the nave, however this was removed along with the box pews during Victorian restoration. The Norman font has a cylindrical stem and bowl, which has an intricately decorated rim.

Outside the church next to the village green is the War Memorial

The parish is within the benefice of Curry Rivel with Fivehead and Swell which is part of the Diocese of Bath and Wells.

== See also ==
- List of Grade I listed buildings in South Somerset
- List of towers in Somerset
- List of ecclesiastical parishes in the Diocese of Bath and Wells
