= Isle Abbots =

Village and civil parish in Somerset, England

Coordinates: 50.984°N 2.925°W

Isle Abbotts
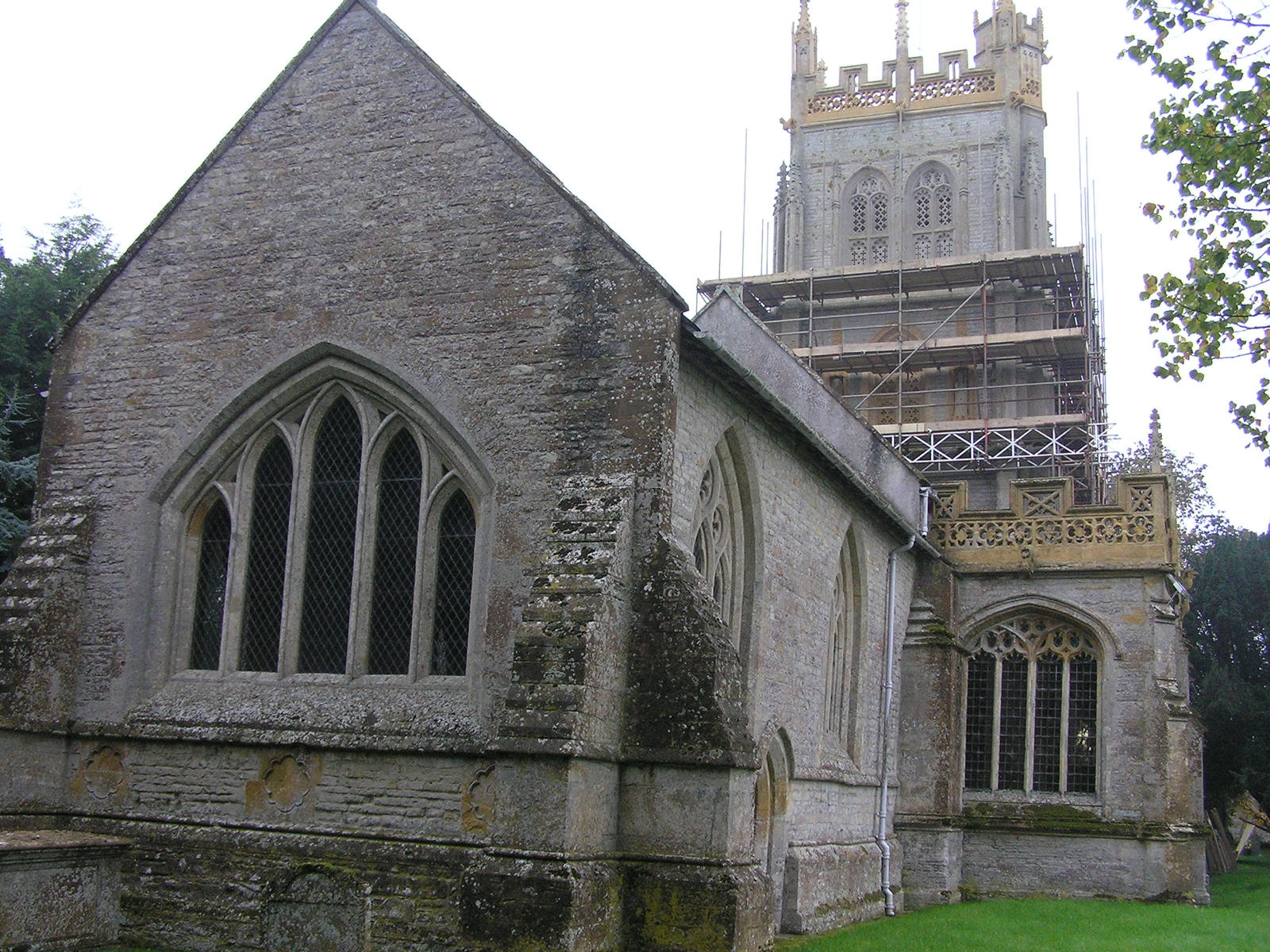
- Church of St Mary the Virgin, Isle Abbotts

- Location within Somerset
- Population: 205 (2011)
- OS grid reference: ST351208
- Unitary authority: Somerset Council
- Ceremonial county: Somerset
- Region: South West
- Country: England
- Sovereign state: United Kingdom
- Post town: Taunton
- Postcode district: TA3
- Dialling code: 01460
- Police: Avon and Somerset
- Fire: Devon and Somerset
- Ambulance: South Western
- UK Parliament: Glastonbury and Somerton

Isle Abbots (also spelled Isle Abbotts) is a village and civil parish in Somerset, England, around 7 miles (11.3 km) south-east of Taunton. The village had a population of 205 at the 2011 census.

== History ==
The name of the village comes from the River Isle, with the second part coming from its ownership by Muchelney Abbey from Saxon times until the Dissolution of the monasteries in 1538. The manor then passed to the Earl of Hertford.

Bromes House has medieval origins and was restored in 1627. It has been designated as a Grade II* listed building.

In 1645, during the Civil War, Isle Abbots was the scene of a skirmish between parliamentary troops under Edward Massie and Royalist forces under Lord Goring who fought for control of the bridges prior to the Battle of Langport.

== Governance ==
The parish council has responsibility for local issues, including setting an annual precept (local rate) to cover the council's operating costs and producing annual accounts for public scrutiny. The parish council evaluates local planning applications and works with the local police, district council officers, and neighbourhood watch groups on matters of crime, security, and traffic. The parish council's role also includes initiating projects for the maintenance and repair of parish facilities, as well as consulting with the district council on the maintenance, repair, and improvement of highways, drainage, footpaths, public transport, and street cleaning. Conservation matters (including trees and listed buildings) and environmental issues are also the responsibility of the council.

For local government purposes, since 1 April 2023, the parish comes under the unitary authority of Somerset Council. Prior to this, it was part of the non-metropolitan district of South Somerset (established under the Local Government Act 1972). It was part of Langport Rural District before 1974.

It is also part of the Glastonbury and Somerton county constituency, represented in the House of Commons of the Parliament of the United Kingdom. It elects one Member of Parliament (MP) by the first past the post system of election.

== Geography ==
Isle Abbotts lies between the River Isle and the Fivehead River.

=== Climate ===
Along with the rest of South West England, Isle Abbots has a temperate climate which is generally wetter and milder than the rest of the country. The annual mean temperature is approximately 10 °C (50.0 °F). Seasonal temperature variation is less extreme than most of the United Kingdom because of the adjacent sea temperatures. The summer months of July and August are the warmest with mean daily maxima of approximately 21 °C (69.8 °F). In winter mean minimum temperatures of 1 °C (33.8 °F) or 2 °C (35.6 °F) are common. In the summer the Azores high pressure affects the south-west of England, however convective cloud sometimes forms inland, reducing the number of hours of sunshine. Annual sunshine rates are slightly less than the regional average of 1,600 hours. In December 1998 there were 20 days without sun recorded at Yeovilton. Most of the rainfall in the south-west is caused by Atlantic depressions or by convection. Most of the rainfall in autumn and winter is caused by the Atlantic depressions, which is when they are most active. In summer, a large proportion of the rainfall is caused by sun heating the ground leading to convection and to showers and thunderstorms. Average rainfall is around 700 mm (28 in). About 8–15 days of snowfall is typical. November to March have the highest mean wind speeds, and June to August have the lightest winds. The predominant wind direction is from the south-west.

== Religious sites ==
The Church of St. Mary the Virgin dates from the 13th century with several restorations since. It has a tower of four stages. The embattled parapet is pierced by quatrefoils, the merlons pierced with lancet openings. The very large corner pinnacles have attached secondary pinnacles, and intermediate pinnacles to each side. The crocketted niches to each face of tower have surviving medieval figures, to west the risen Christ stepping from His sarcophagus, the Blessed Virgin with Bambino, St Peter and St Paul; to south St George, St Catherine, St Margaret; to east St John Baptist, St Clement; to north St Michael. The wealth of architectural detail and sculpture has required specific approaches to the methodology of repair and protection using lime-based materials. The church tower has eight hunky punks depicting a person playing the bagpipes, an oriental lion dog, a goat, a dragon, a Chinese dragon, a primitive dragon, a winged lion and a lion. The church also houses a barrel organ made by Henry Bryceson in about 1835.

There was also a Baptist chapel in the village, which was built in 1815 and restored in 1874. The building is no longer in use and has been sold.
