= Church of St Mary, Yarlington =

Church in Somerset, England

Church of St Mary
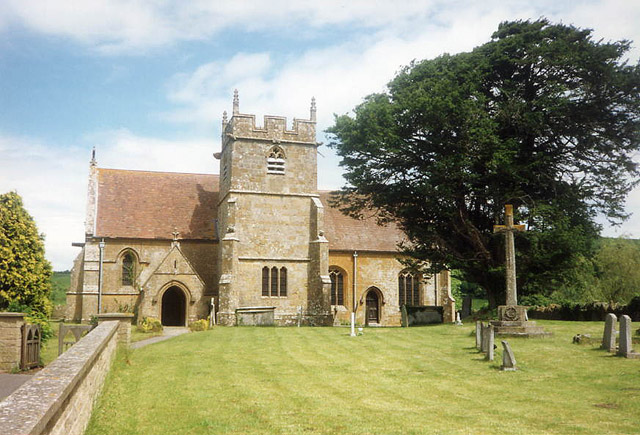

- Location within Somerset
- 51.0621°N 2.4941°W
- Location: Yarlington, Somerset, England

History
- Built: 11th century

Listed Building – Grade II*
- Official name: Church of St Mary
- Designated: 24 March 1961
- Reference no.: 1056212

The Anglican Church of St Mary in Yarlington, Somerset, England was built in the 11th century. It is a Grade II* listed building.

== History ==
The church was built in the 11th century, on the site of a previous church which had been under the control of Montacute Priory. Most of the building, with the exception of the tower, was rebuilt in 1878. The design of the rebuilt church was influenced by the Cambridge Camden Society. The tower was repointed and pinnacles and merlons replaced by Minerva Conservation.

The parish is part of the Camelot Parishes benefice within the Diocese of Bath and Wells.

== Architecture ==
The stone building has Doulting or hamstone dressings and clay tiled roofs. It consists of a three-bay nave and two-bay chancel with an aisle on the north and porch on the south side. The two-stage square tower remains from the original building.

Inside the church the fittings are from the 19th century with the exception of the octagonal font which dates from the 15th.

== See also ==
- List of ecclesiastical parishes in the Diocese of Bath and Wells
- Hunky punks
