= Swell Court Farmhouse, Fivehead =

Swell Court Farmhouse
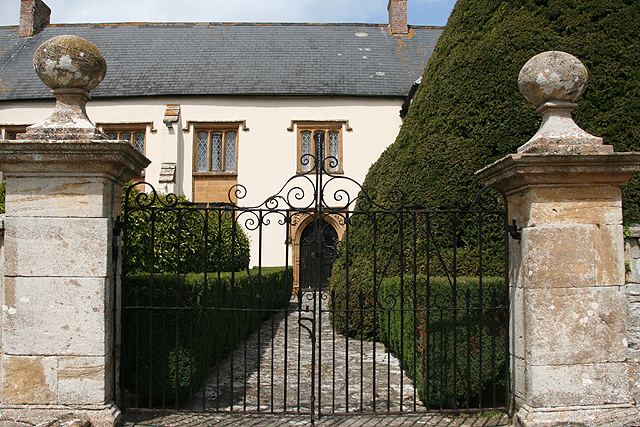

- Location within Somerset
- 51°00′30″N 2°54′01″W
- Location: Fivehead, Somerset, England

History
- Built: 15th century

Listed Building – Grade I
- Official name: Swell Court Farmhouse
- Designated: 17 April 1959
- Reference no.: 1249582

Swell Court Farmhouse in Swell Lane, Fivehead, Somerset, England dates from the 15th century and has been designated as a Grade I listed building.

It is adjacent to Church of St Catherine, Fivehead which is also Grade I listed.

== See also ==
- List of Grade I listed buildings in South Somerset
- List of towers in Somerset
