= Yarlington Wassail =

Festive event

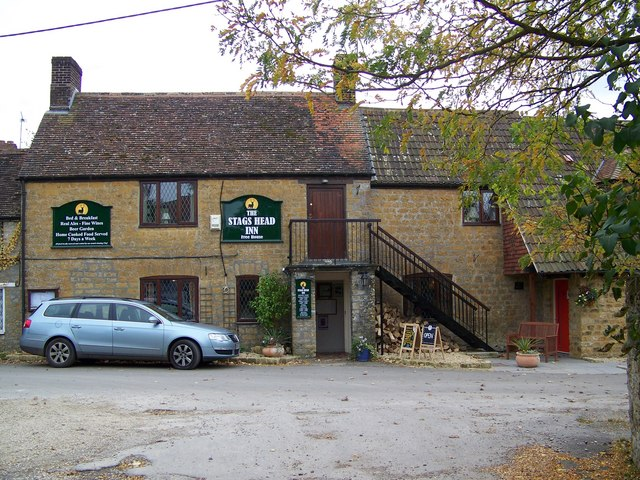
The Stag's Head Inn

The Yarlington Wassail is a Wassail held in the village of Yarlington, Somerset, England, and dating from the 17th century.

The Wassail, which has not been held for many years, was revived in January 2012 by the Brue Valley Rotary Club. The Wassail began outside the local Pub, the Stag's Head Inn, with music and dance performed by the Wyvern Jubilee Morris Men. There was then a noisy procession to a local orchard where the Wassailing Carol (see below) was sung, the Wassail Queen placed slices of bread soaked in cider in the oldest tree in the orchard. Cider was then poured around the base of the tree and a shotgun was fired into the night sky. After drinking mulled cider and apple juice the procession returns to the local pub. The Wyvern Jubilee Morris Men then performed a Mummers Play. A traditional meal of pork with apple sauce was followed by apple crumble with custard.

The Wassailing Carol that was sung was:

Old apple tree we wassail thee
And hoping thou will bear
For the Lord doth know where we shall be
'Till apples come another year.

For to bear well and to bloom well
So merry let us be
Let every man take off his hat
And shout to the old apple tree

Old Apple tree we wassail thee
And hoping thou will bear
Hat fulls, Cap fulls
Three bushel bag fulls
And a little heap under the stair

There is also a song called the Yarlington Wassail.
