= Yarlington =

Village and civil parish in Somerset, England

Coordinates: 51.0637°N 2.4937°W

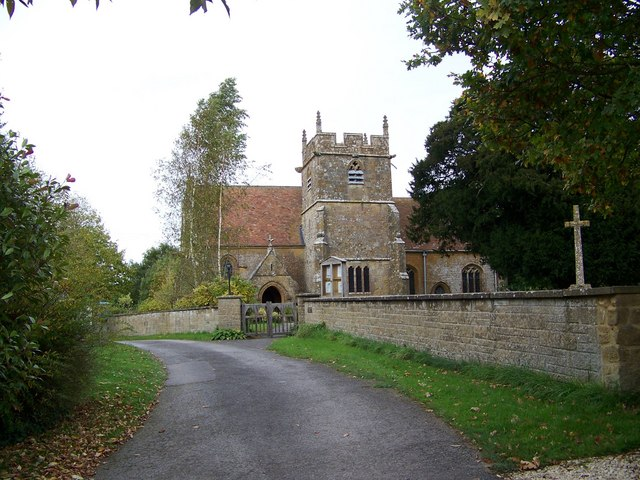
- Church of St Mary, Yarlington

- Location within Somerset
- Population: 123 (2011)
- OS grid reference: ST655295
- Unitary authority: Somerset Council
- Ceremonial county: Somerset
- Region: South West
- Country: England
- Sovereign state: United Kingdom
- Post town: Wincanton
- Postcode district: BA9
- Police: Avon and Somerset
- Fire: Devon and Somerset
- Ambulance: South Western
- UK Parliament: Glastonbury and Somerton

Yarlington is a village and civil parish, near the source of the River Cam, in the English county of Somerset. Administratively, Yarlington shares a parish council with nearby North Cadbury.

The village gives its name to the Yarlington Mill cider apple.

The village hosts the Yarlington Wassail which has been recently revived.

== History ==
It was known as Gerlincgetuna, meaning the settlement of Gerla's people, in the Domesday Book of 1086. The manor passed in the 12th century to the Montagues, who later became the earls of Salisbury.

Henry VIII gave the manor to his last wife Katherine Parr in 1544 and, in 1547, her brother William Parr, Marquis of Northampton, sold the reversion by licence to Thomas Smyth (Smythe/Smith). Thomas Smith was knighted in 1548. Sir Thomas Smith was described as 'of Ankerwicke, in the county of Berks, Knight' when by deed of 6 July 1556, he sold the manor and advowson to William Rosewell, of Loxton, in the county of Somerset, gentleman, and William Rosewell, his son and heir apparent. This William Rosewell became the Solicitor-General to Queen Elizabeth and lived at the manor until about 1562.

In 1573, a William Rosewell is presented to the Rectory of Yarlington by William Rosewell, of Loxton. As William Rosewell of Loxton died in 1570 the presentation must have been made by the executors of his estate. The presentee was probably the youngest son of William Rosewell (1499-1568), of Dunkerton, and brother of Thomas Rosewell (1533-c.1602) of Dunkerton who is listed as patron in the presentation. The living was held by William Rosewell until his death in 1627.

The Rosewells held the manor for thirty-six years, and William Rosewell, the son of the Solicitor-General, and who is described in the deed of conveyance as 'William Rosewell, of Forde, in the county of Devon, esquire,’ sold the Manor and advowson of Yarlington to Sir Henry Berkeley, of Bruton. The conveyance was dated 8 February 1592.

The manor and advowson was held by a branch of the Berkeleys of Bruton from 1592 until their descendant, Lord Carmarthen, sold it to John Rogers in 1782. Rogers built Yarlington House as his manor house. Woolston Manor lay in the south of the parish. It was sold in 1835 to Joseph Goodenough, who rebuilt the manor house further back from the road between 1835 and 1838. The manor house has been a Grade II listed building since 18 March 1986.

Yarlington was part of the hundred of Bruton.

== Governance ==
The parish council has responsibility for local issues, including setting an annual precept (local rate) to cover the council's operating costs and producing annual accounts for public scrutiny. The parish council evaluates local planning applications and works with the local police, district council officers, and neighbourhood watch groups on matters of crime, security, and traffic. The parish council's role also includes initiating projects for the maintenance and repair of parish facilities, as well as consulting with the district council on the maintenance, repair, and improvement of highways, drainage, footpaths, public transport, and street cleaning. Conservation matters (including trees and listed buildings) and environmental issues are also the responsibility of the council.

For local government purposes, since 1 April 2023, the parish comes under the unitary authority of Somerset Council. Prior to this, it was part of the non-metropolitan district of South Somerset (established under the Local Government Act 1972). It was part of Wincanton Rural District before 1974.

It is also part of a county constituency represented in the House of Commons of the Parliament of the United Kingdom. It elects one Member of Parliament (MP) by the first past the post system of election.

== Religious sites ==
The Anglican parish Church of St Mary has an 11th-century tower, however the rest of the building was rebuilt by J.A. Reeve in 1878. It has been designated as a Grade II* listed building.
