= Gargoyle =

Exterior building sculpture

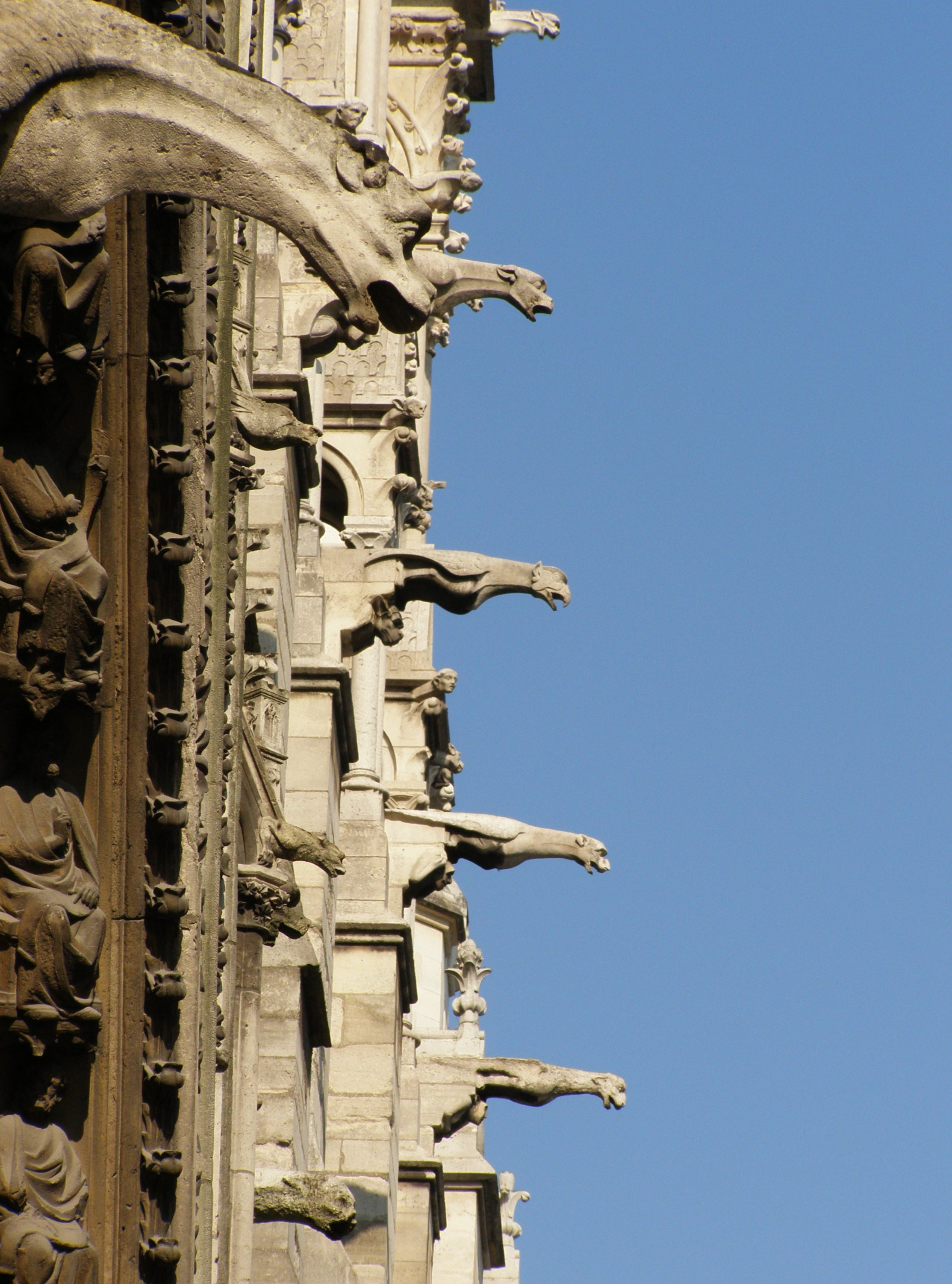
Gargoyles of Notre-Dame de Paris

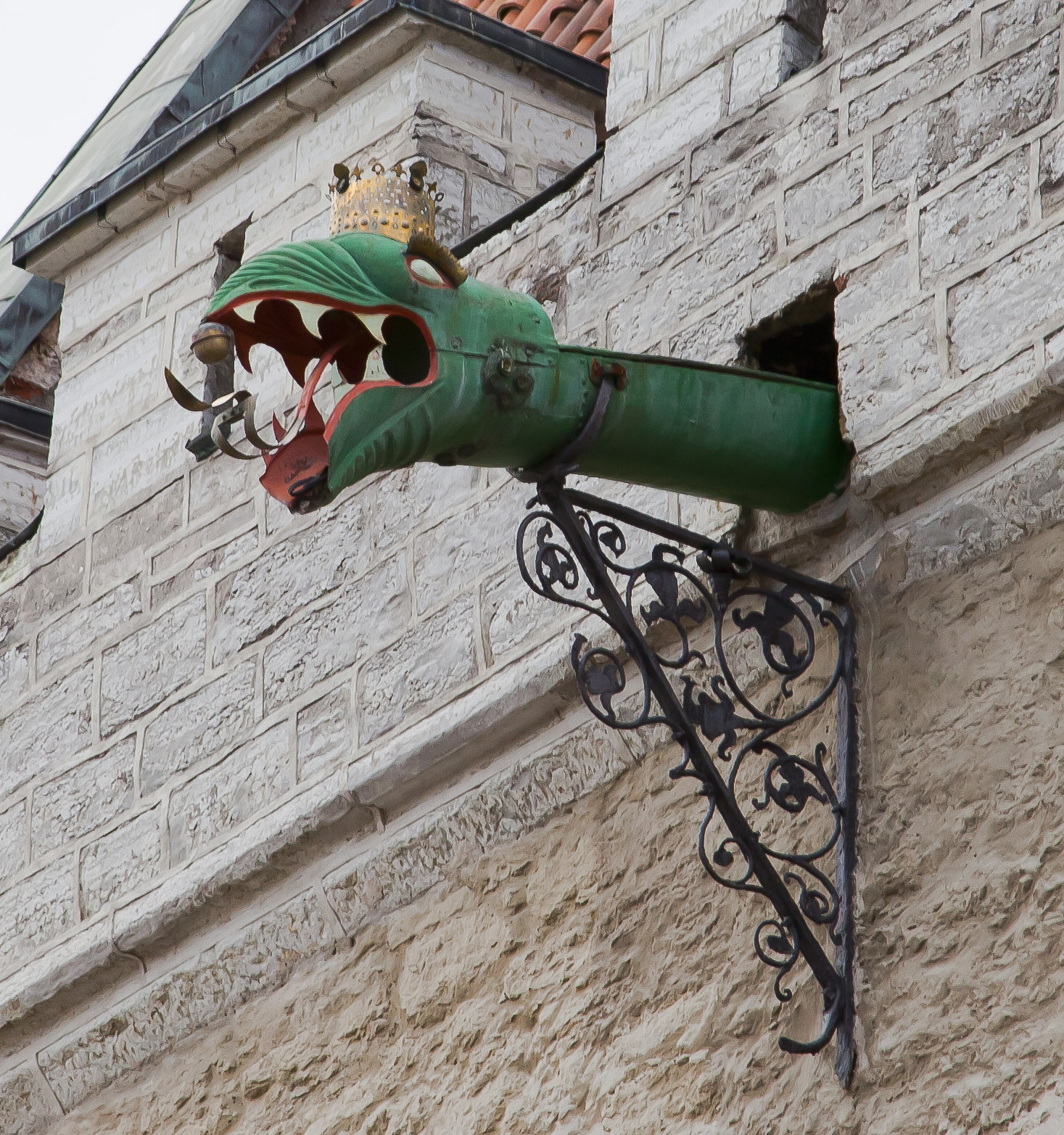
Dragon-headed gargoyle of the Tallinn Town Hall, Estonia

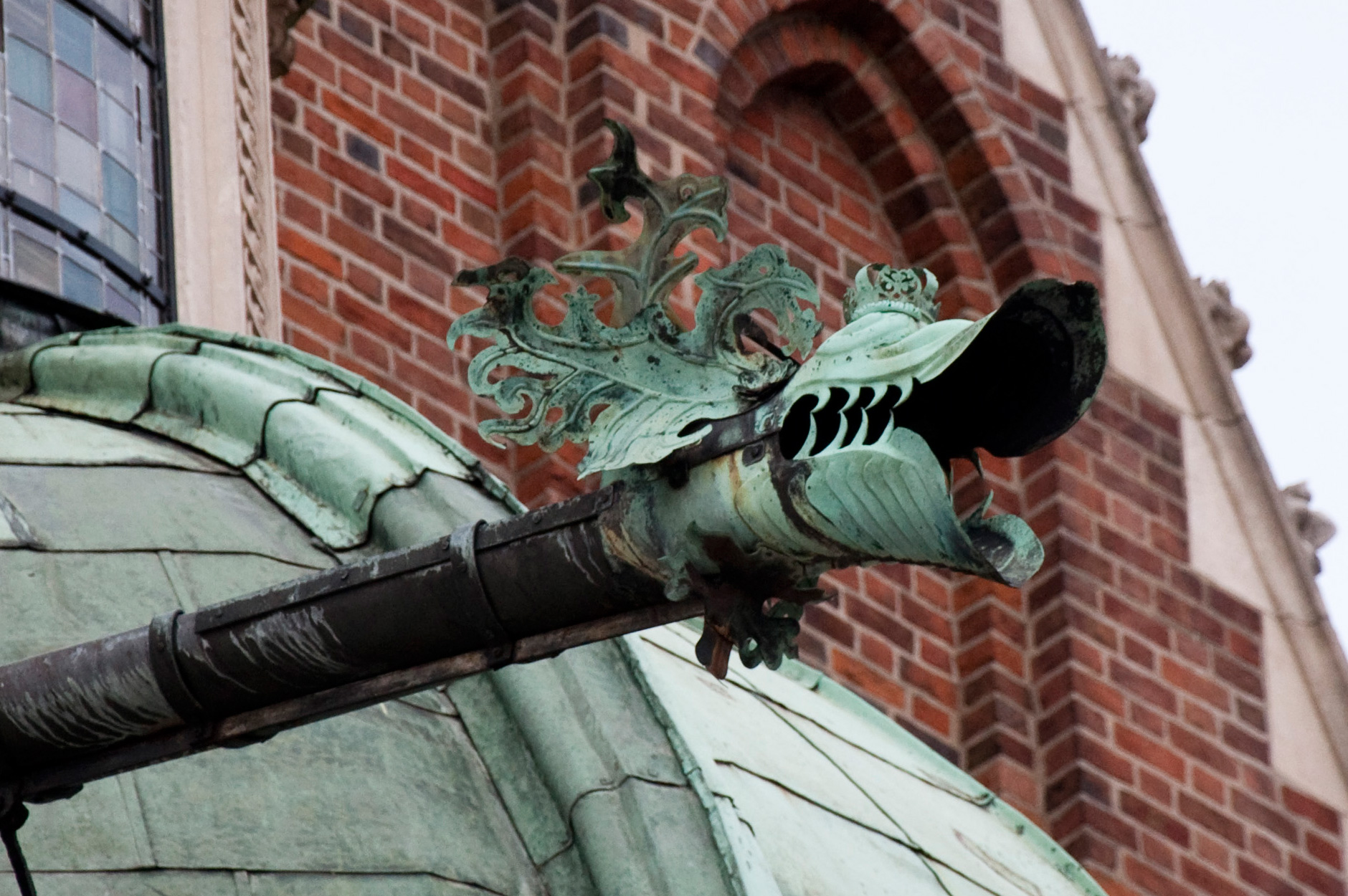
Gargoyle of the Vasa Chapel at Wawel in Kraków, Poland

In architecture, and specifically Gothic architecture, a gargoyle (/ˈɡɑːrɡɔɪl/) is a carved or formed grotesque with a spout designed to convey water from a roof and away from the side of a building, thereby preventing it from running down masonry walls and eroding the mortar between. Architects often used multiple gargoyles on a building to divide the flow of rainwater off the roof to minimize potential damage from rainstorms. A trough is cut in the back of the gargoyle and rainwater typically exits through the open mouth. Gargoyles are usually elongated fantastical animals because their length determines how far water is directed from the wall. When Gothic flying buttresses were used, aqueducts were sometimes cut into the buttress to divert water over the aisle walls.

== Etymology ==
The term originates from the French gargouille (Old French gargoule (1294) "conduit for waterflow"), composed of the onomatopoeic root garg- and the Old French goule "animal mouth, throat", which remained dialectal or is otherwise known as the "gullet"; gullet is itself from Old French golet, diminutive form of gole (older spelling of goule) cf. Latin gula "gullet, throat, palate, mouth", gurgulio and similar words derived from the root gurg- / garg- "to swallow", which represented the gurgling sound of water (e.g., Portuguese and Spanish garganta, "throat"; but gárgola "gargoyle" is from Old French). It is also connected to the French verb gargariser, which shares the garg- root with the verb gargle, from Old French too and is likely imitative in origin. The Italian word for gargoyle is doccione or gronda sporgente, an architecturally precise phrase which means "protruding gutter". Italian also uses gargolla or garguglia, borrowed from Old French and French, when it has a grotesque shape.

When not constructed as a waterspout and only serving an ornamental or artistic function, the technical term for such a sculpture is a grotesque, chimera, or boss. There are also regional variations, such as the hunky punk. Just as with bosses and chimeras, gargoyles are said to protect what they guard, such as a church, from any evil or harmful spirits.

== Legend of the Gargouille ==
A French legend that sprang up around the name of St. Romanus (French: Romain; fl. c. 631–641 AD), the former chancellor of the Merovingian king Chlothar II who was made bishop of Rouen, relates how he delivered the country around Rouen from a monster called Gargouille or Goji. La Gargouille is said to have been a standard dragon of Western-European origin, with bat-like wings, a long neck, and the ability to breathe fire. Multiple versions of the story are given, either that St. Romanus subdued the creature with a crucifix, or he captured the creature with the help of the only volunteer, a condemned man. In each, the monster is led back to Rouen and burned, but its head and neck would not burn due to being tempered by its own fire breath, so the head was mounted upon the cathedral walls to serve as a prophylactic against evil spirits. In commemoration of St. Romain, the Archbishops of Rouen were granted the right to set a prisoner free on the day that the reliquary of the saint was carried in procession (see details at Rouen).

== History ==
The term gargoyle is most often applied to medieval work, but throughout all ages, some means of water diversion, when not conveyed in gutters, was adopted. In ancient Egyptian architecture, gargoyles showed little variation, typically in the form of a lion's head. Similar lion-mouthed water spouts were also seen on Greek temples, carved or modelled in the marble or terracotta cymatium of the cornice. An excellent example of this are the 39 remaining lion-headed water spouts on the Temple of Zeus. Originally, it had 102 gargoyles or spouts, but due to the heavy weight (they were crafted from marble), many snapped off and had to be replaced.

Many medieval cathedrals included gargoyles and chimeras. According to French architect and author Eugène Viollet-le-Duc, himself one of the great producers of gargoyles in the 19th century, the earliest known medieval gargoyles appear on Laon Cathedral (c. 1200–1220). One of the more famous examples is the gargoyles of Notre-Dame de Paris, which dons 54 chimeras crowded around the railings of the cathedral that came to be in the 1843 restoration project. Although most have grotesque features, the term gargoyle has come to include all types of images. Some gargoyles were depicted as monks, or combinations of real animals and people, many of which were humorous. Unusual animal mixtures, or chimeras, did not act as rainspouts and are more properly called grotesques. They serve as ornamentation but are now popularly called gargoyles. Both ornamented and unornamented waterspouts projecting from roofs at parapet level were a common device used to shed rainwater from buildings until the early 18th century. From that time, more and more buildings used drainpipes to carry the water from the guttering roof to the ground and only very few buildings using gargoyles were constructed. This was because some people found them frightening, and sometimes heavy ones fell off, causing damage. The London Building Act 1724 (11 Geo. 1. c. 28), passed by the Parliament of Great Britain made the use of downpipes compulsory in all new construction.

== Purpose ==
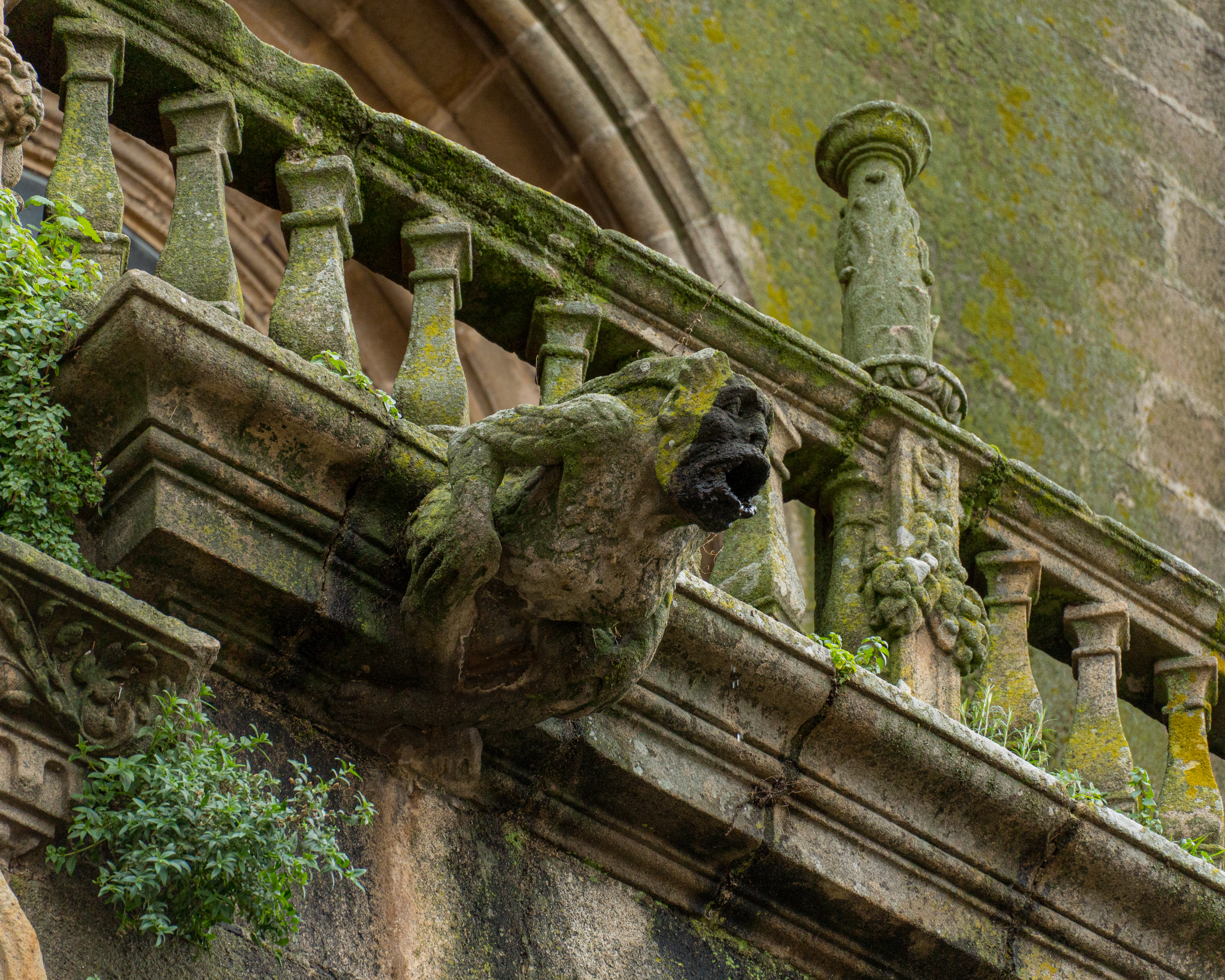
Gargoyle at the Plasencia Cathedral, Spain

There are divided ideas as to the purpose of adding gargoyles to religious structures. Some state that gargoyles were meant to illustrate evil and sin, while others have posited that grotesques in architecture were apotropaic devices. In the 12th century, before the use of gargoyles as rain spouts, St. Bernard of Clairvaux was famous for speaking out against gargoyles carved on the walls of his monastery's cloister: St. Bernard emphasizes the absurdity of the gargoyles' strange combinations of bodily parts. St. Bernard was a Cistercian, meaning he was unimpressed by the more ornate and expressive decoration used in any given cathedral or church. Because of this, he was repulsed by gargoyles and found them insulting to the church.

What are these fantastic monsters doing in the cloisters before the eyes of the brothers as they read?

While the theory that gargoyles were spiritual devices made to ward off devilish evil was very widely known and accepted, other schools of thoughts have developed over time. For example, in the case of gargoyles unattributable to any one or two animals, some say that they were simply the product of pagan mythology passed down through generations in the medium of fireside tales. Akin to the leading theory but slightly different, some suggest that gargoyles were meant not to intimidate evil spirits or demons, but humans. It is said that at the gateway of the city of Amiens, France, two gargoyles stood guard, and anyone with bad intentions toward the city and its people would be spewed with acid before being able to enter. On the contrary, the king of Amiens would be showered with coins with every return.

Other gargoyles were meant to strike fear into the heart of the pious, specifically those that were anthropomorphized. Gargoyles that were mostly human but had animalistic attributes, like the harpy or cynocephaly were meant to represent the torturous fate of sinners. Some gargoyles were purely decoration, like the monkey in the courtyard of the palace of Jacques Cœur in Bourges, France. This stylistic choice was supposedly a nod to Cœr's exotic and adventurous lifestyle, as monkeys are a species not native to France.

It is most likely that gargoyles meant one or more of these things depending on where and when they were made, and pinning one purpose to the entirety of gargoyles is impossible. According to Lester Burbank Bridaham, writing in Gargoyles, Chimeres and the Grotesque in French Gothic Sculpture, "There is much symbolism in the sculpture of the Gothic period; but we must be wary of reading in too much meaning."

== Animals ==
The ancient Egyptians, Greeks, Etruscans, and Romans all used animal-shaped waterspouts. During the 12th Century, when gargoyles appeared in Europe, the Roman Catholic Church was growing stronger and converting many new people. Most of the population at this time was illiterate, so images were very important to convey ideas. Many early gargoyles depicted some version of a dragon, especially in France. In addition to serving as spouts for water, the gaping mouths of these gargoyles evoked the fearsome destructiveness of these legendary beasts, reminding the laity of the need for the church's protection.

The reason why many gargoyles are depicted as these dragon-looking, unidentifiable monsters is because it is said the founding bishops of churches would rid their respective towns of these kinds of beasts.

Human qualities were sometimes ascribed to specific animals—that is, the animals were anthropomorphized. This was especially common for pagans, and using these ideas helped conversion to Christianity. Some animals (such as the rhinoceros and the hippopotamus) were unknown in western Europe during the Middle Ages, so gargoyles of these species (such as the ones at Laon Cathedral) are modern gargoyles and therefore did not have symbolic meaning in medieval times.

The Lion was the most prominent figure for animal gargoyles, likely due to their frequent appearances in other medieval art and even art in antiquity. Lions became a symbol of Christ and, therefore, were said to have the same characteristics as Christ. Supposedly, the lion's tail had the power to erase its tracks, and because of this could elude the devil. The lioness was said to give birth to dead cubs, which would resurrect 3 days later, like Jesus Christ. Among these divine attributes, lions were generally believed to be virtuous in a multitude of ways, such as being extremely loyal and in control of their emotions.

== Humanization ==
Depictions of humans in gargoyle and grotesque figures were later developments from the animalistic or beastly examples one is likely more familiar with, and were almost a natural progression in subject matter for the statues. Humans gargoyles were often comedic and depicted in bawdy positions, some leaning over the ledge they are perched on to vomit or defecate off of. The orifice that rainwater would come out of would imply that it was vomit or fecal matter. Alike the aforementioned gargoyles akin to the monstrous races, many human gargoyles would represent the common acts of certain sinners, such as a prostitute or moneylender. Some gargoyles depict those who are guilty of what one would call a social sin: a woman who is reading for example, as women were not expected and often shunned for attempting to engage in literature.

Since the initial idea behind the brutish and frightening gargoyle in the 12th century was to ward off evil, it's hard to believe that these later humorous and sarcastic figures served the same purpose. Instead it's often hypothesized that many human gargoyles were meant to be criticisms of the common church attendee, a mirror into one's own sin or wrongdoings used for introspection. Others believe, however, that the change to human characteristics in gargoyles created a sense of familiarity and relatability in the eyes of the everyday Church-goer.

The furthest evolution of human gargoyles and grotesques would be the corbel head. Realistic, corbel heads were works by stone carvers as they depicted realistic human facial structure and emotion. Corbel heads were not exclusive to any particular kind of person, and represented a fair array of social classes, however, it was very common for them to be mocking the clergy. Corbel heads were often in places that couldn't be seen by anyone on the ground looking up at the corresponding cathedral, in fact, the corbel heads of Reims Cathedral were only recently discovered in the early 20th century when photographers were permitted to scale the buildings. Because of their frequently obscured locations, corbel heads were likely sites of practice for stone carvers. This along with the suspected frustration of stone artisans due to disproportionate compensation from the clergy, lead some to think that stone cutters created the obnoxious, tongue-out, mouth-pulling faces as a way to mock the clergy.

== Influence on the Western World ==
Although gargoyles were exclusive to Europe for the longest time, their intrigue still attracted those a continent away. Gargoyles can be found in the columns of the Harvard Law School building, fitting for its Gothic architecture. These along with grotesques built at Princeton College were sculpted by Gutzon Borglum. George B. Post was responsible for the frequent use of grotesques on multiple New York City buildings. His architectural works consisted of the multiple grotesques scattered across the multiple buildings of the College of the City of New York and four corbel heads that can be found under a balcony at the National Arts Club Building, Gramercy Park South in New York City. Other important figures in the American implementation of gargoyles and grotesques consist of E.F Guilbert, who had the construction of various gargoyles on the Newark Manuel Training School represents the several aspects of the curriculum, as well as John Russell Pope, who carved several grotesques of varying distinct human expressions from wood at Deepdale, Long Island, a personal estate of the Vanderbilt family. John Taylor Arms educated the American public of gargoyles through his own etchings of various gargoyles found across Europe. Some instances include etchings of the gargoyles at Notre Dame Cathedral and Amiens Cathedral. His works were regarded as incredibly accurate in portraying the emotion in the expression of the original gargoyles.

== Gallery ==
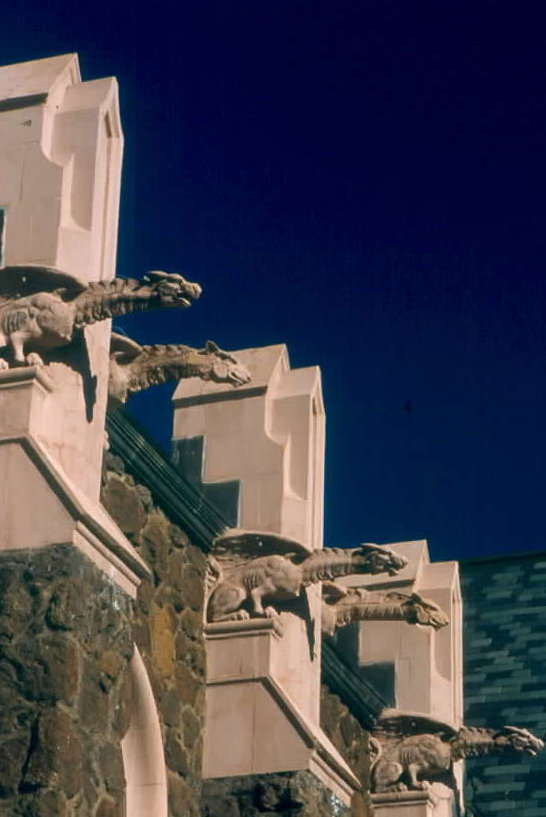
Chimera of Nativity of the Blessed Virgin Mary Chapel in Flagstaff, Arizona

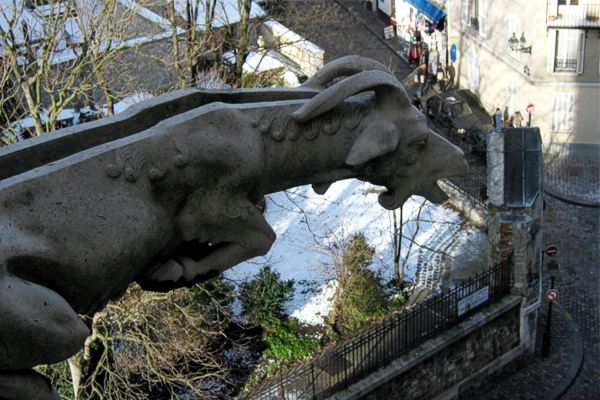
A gargoyle on the Basilique du Sacré-Cœur, Paris, France, showing the water channel

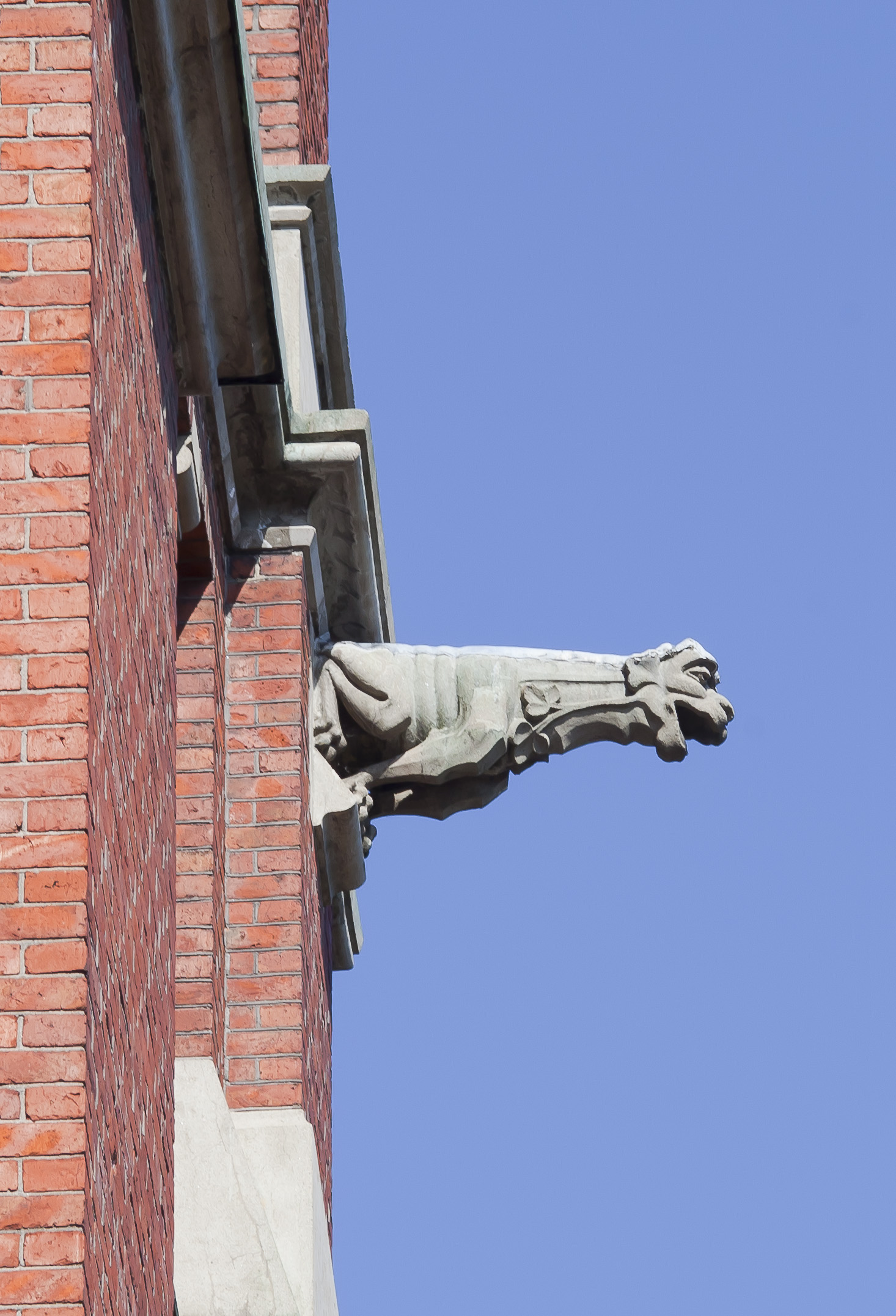
Gargoyle at the St. John's Church, Helsinki, Finland

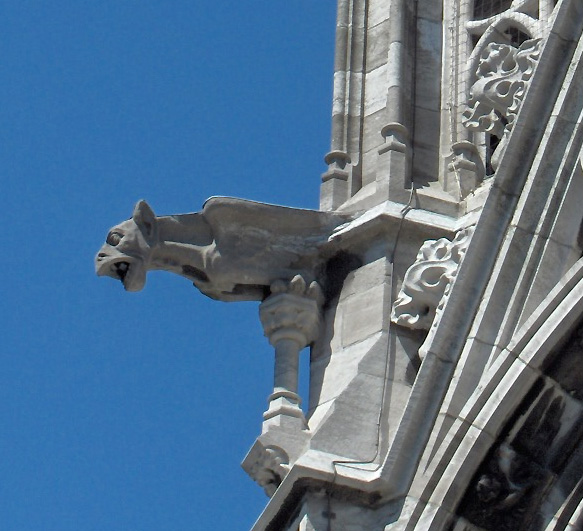
Gargoyle at the St.-Petrus-en-Pauluskerk, Ostend, Belgium

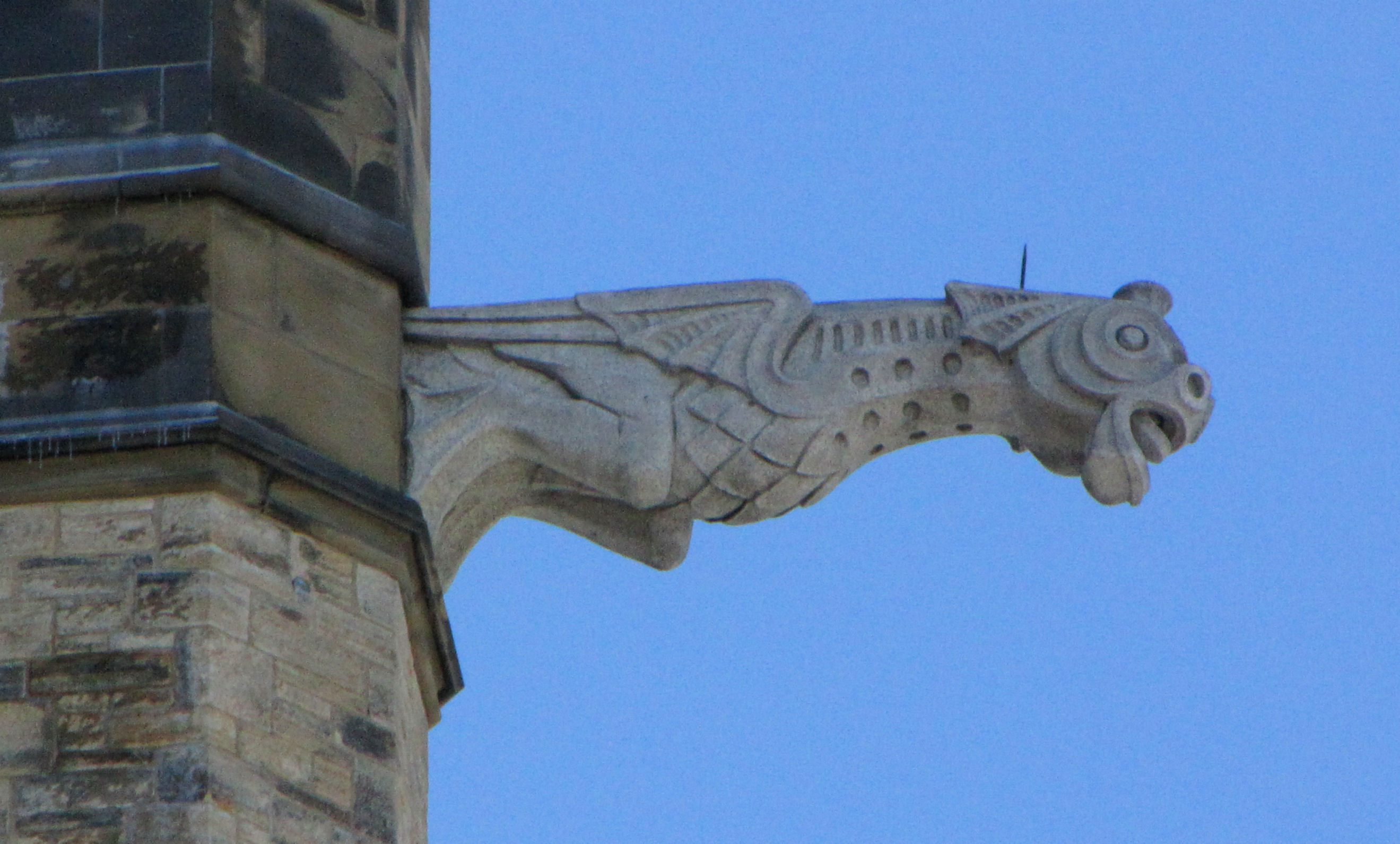
One of four gargoyles atop the Peace Tower, Ottawa, Ontario, Canada

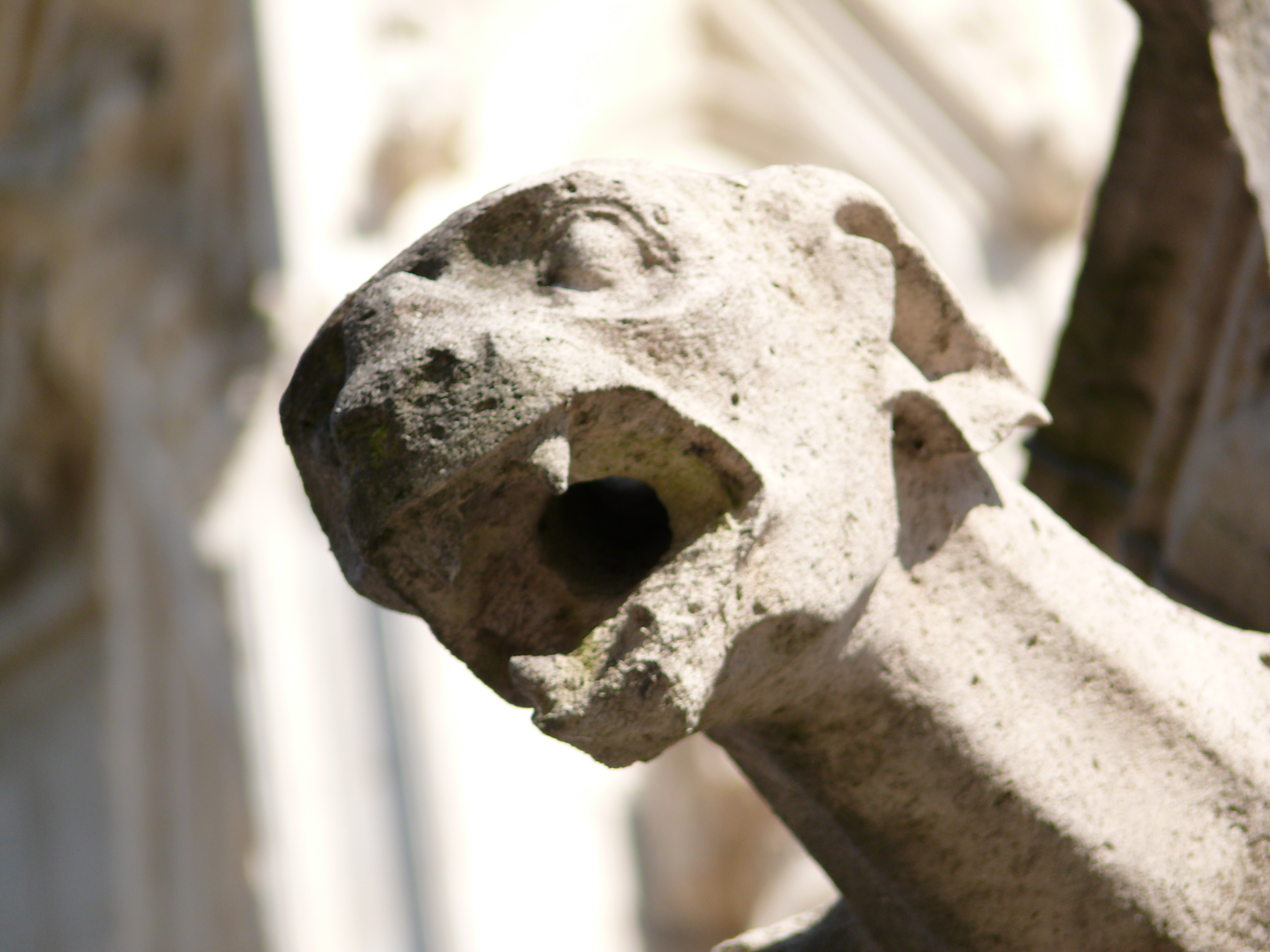
Gargoyle of Notre-Dame d'Amiens, France

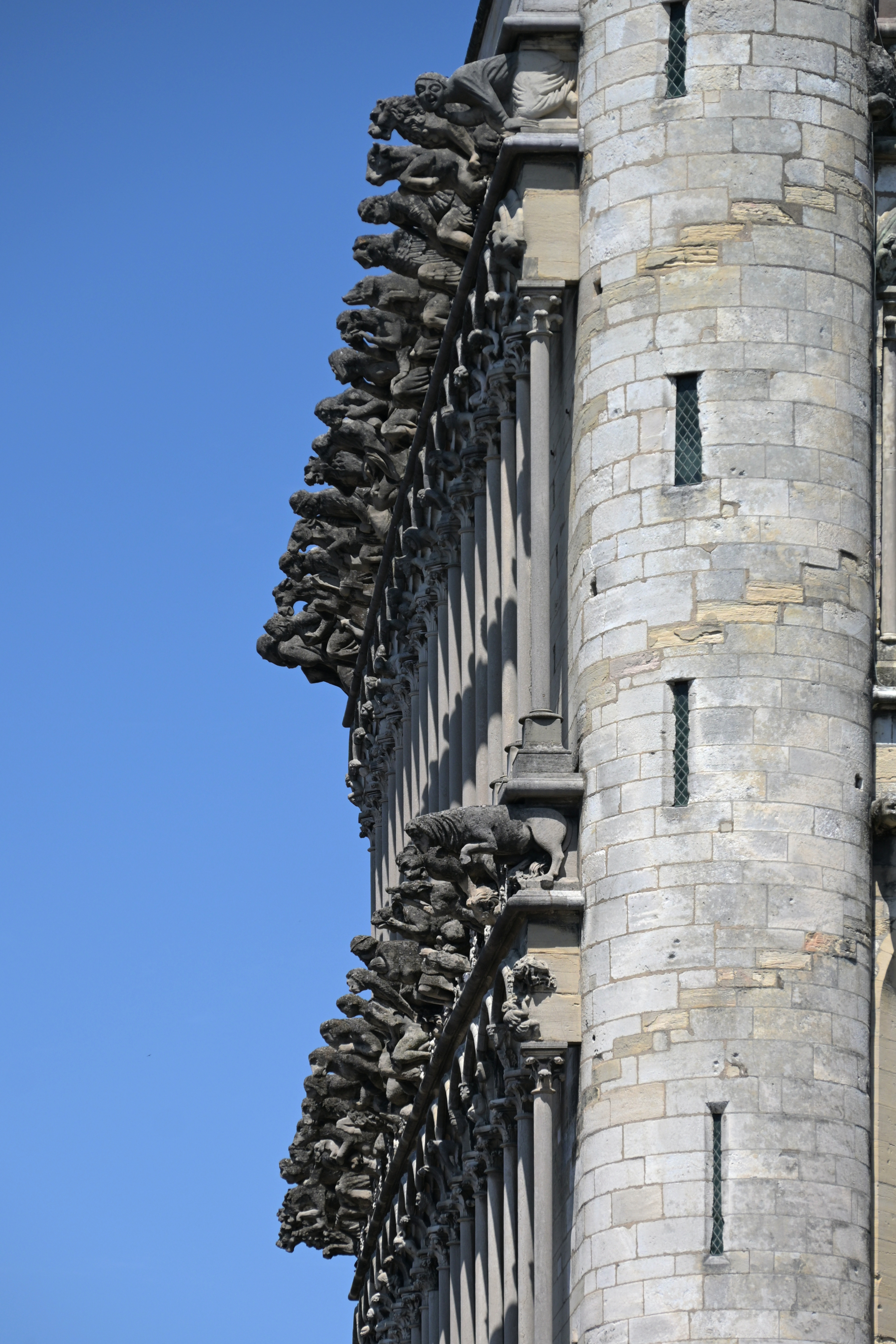
Notre Dame Church in Dijon, France

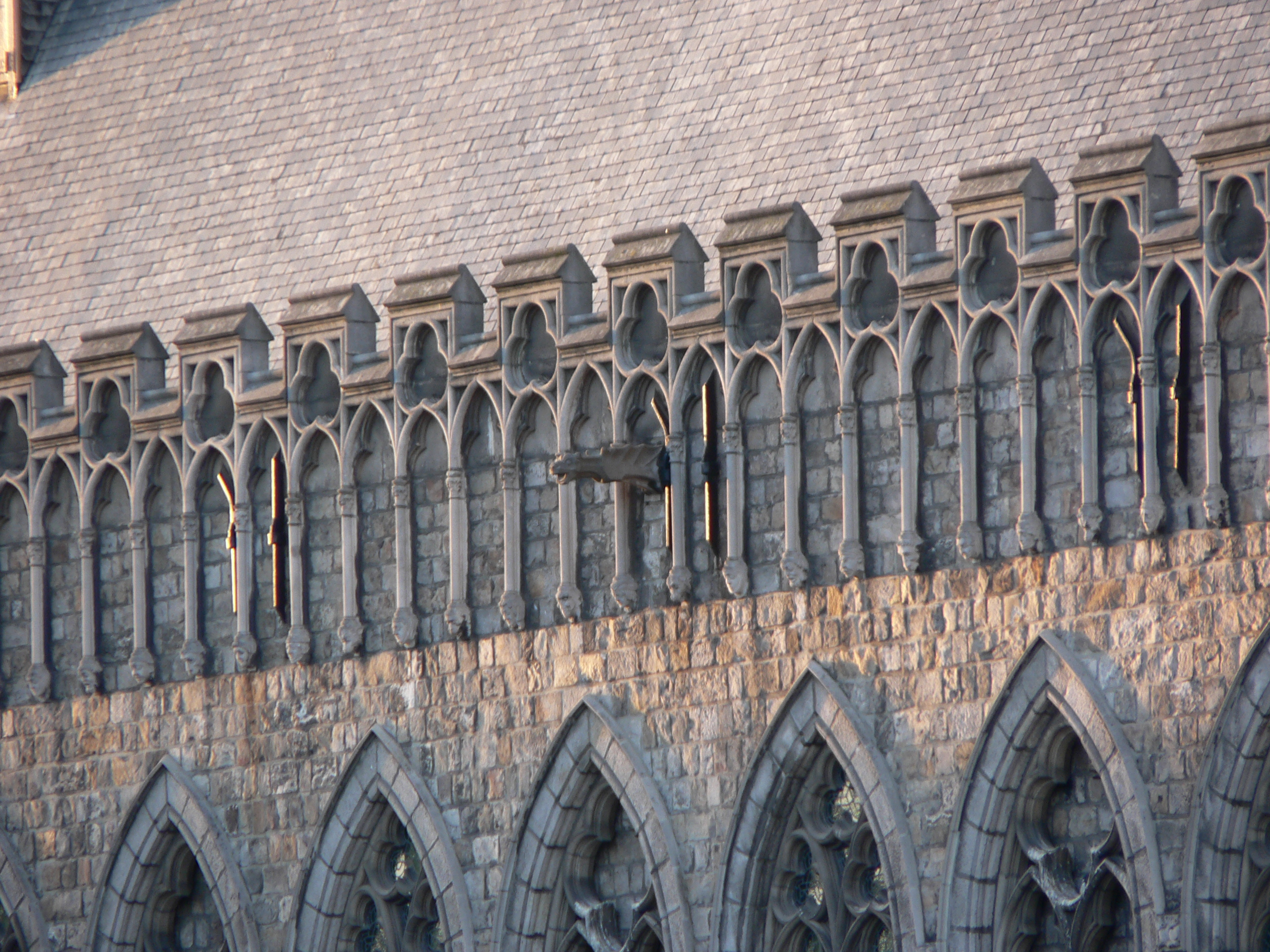
Gargoyle at the Cloth Hall, Ypres, Belgium

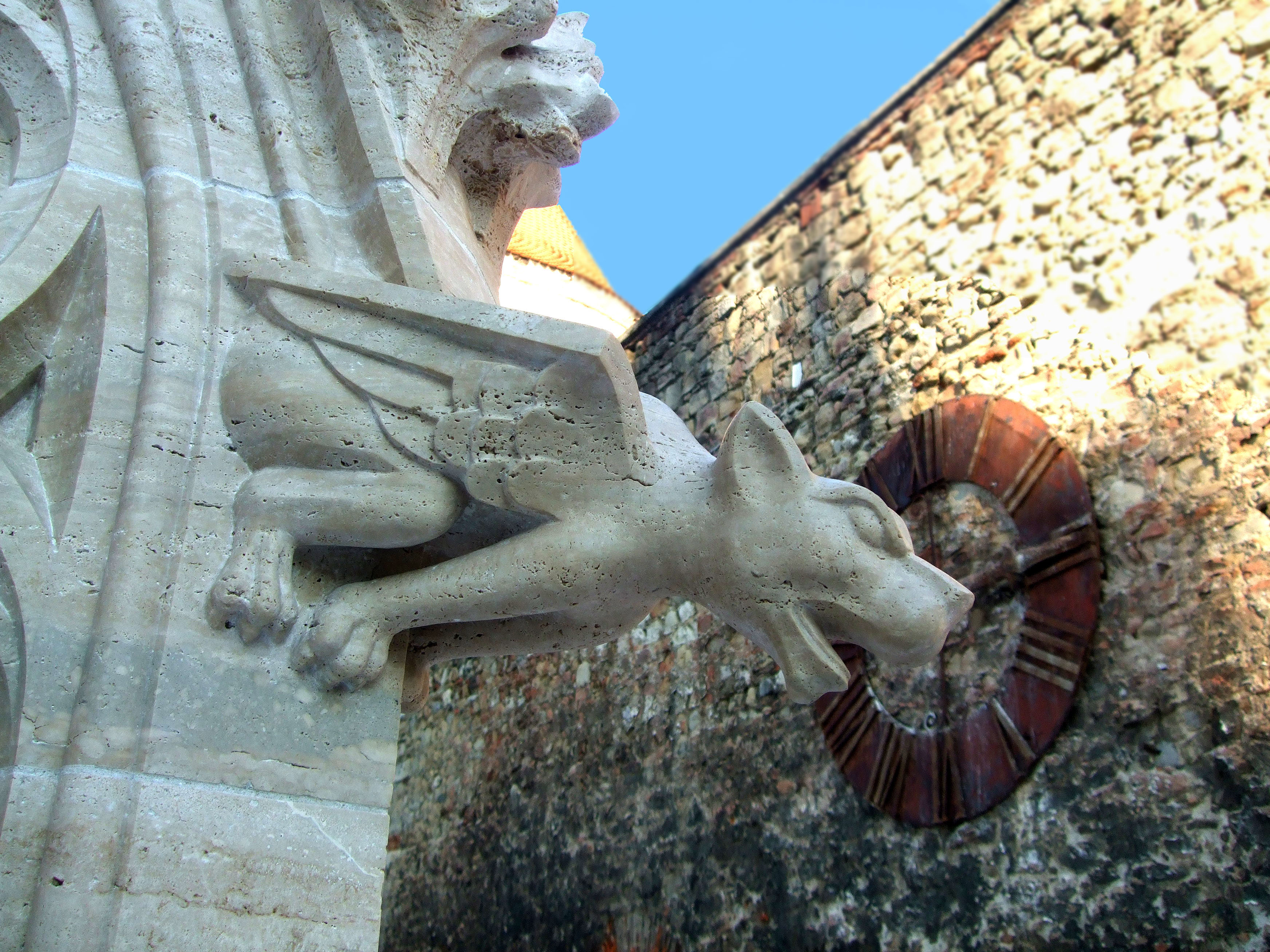
Gargoyle on Zagreb Cathedral, Croatia

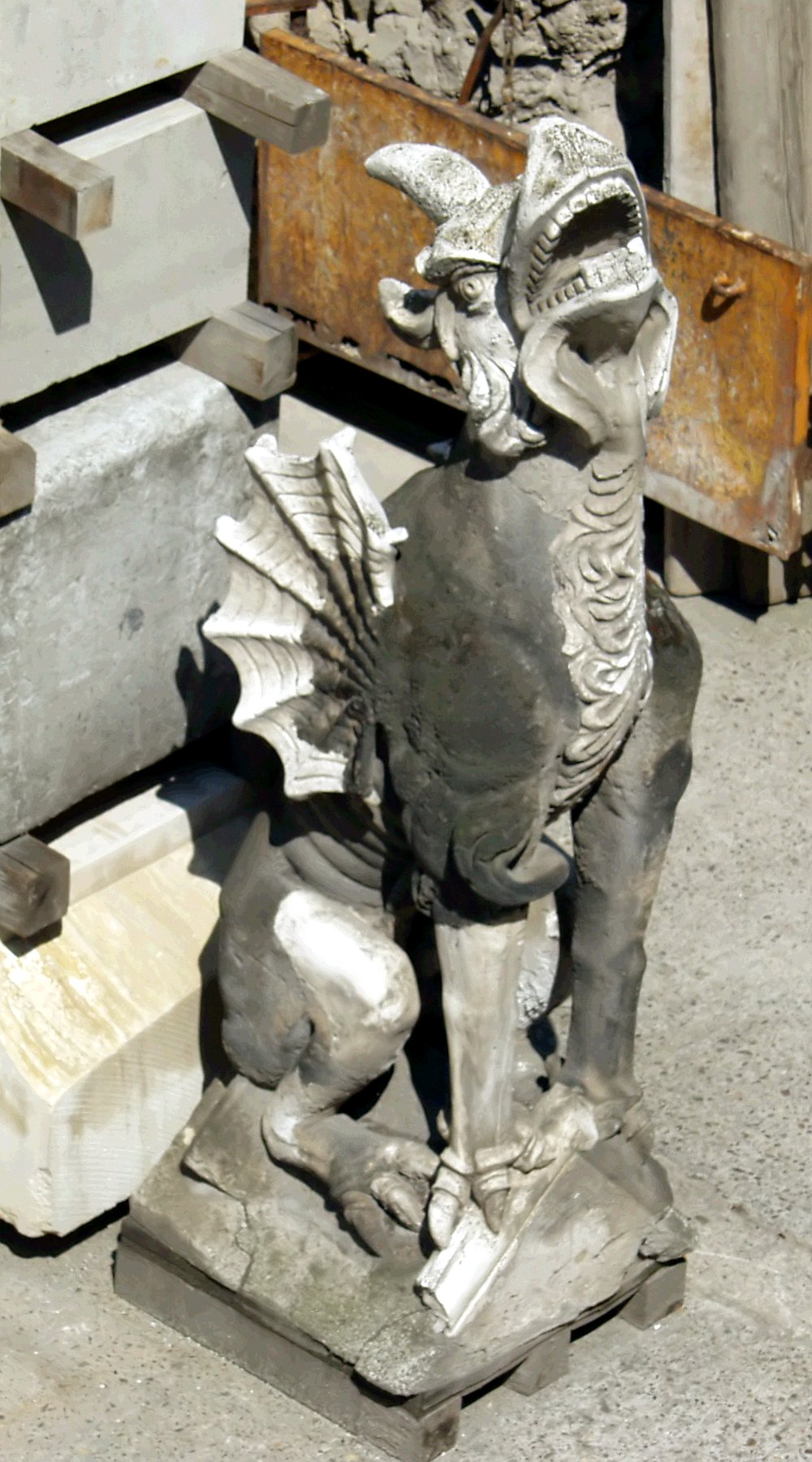
Gargoyle from Cologne Cathedral under reconstruction

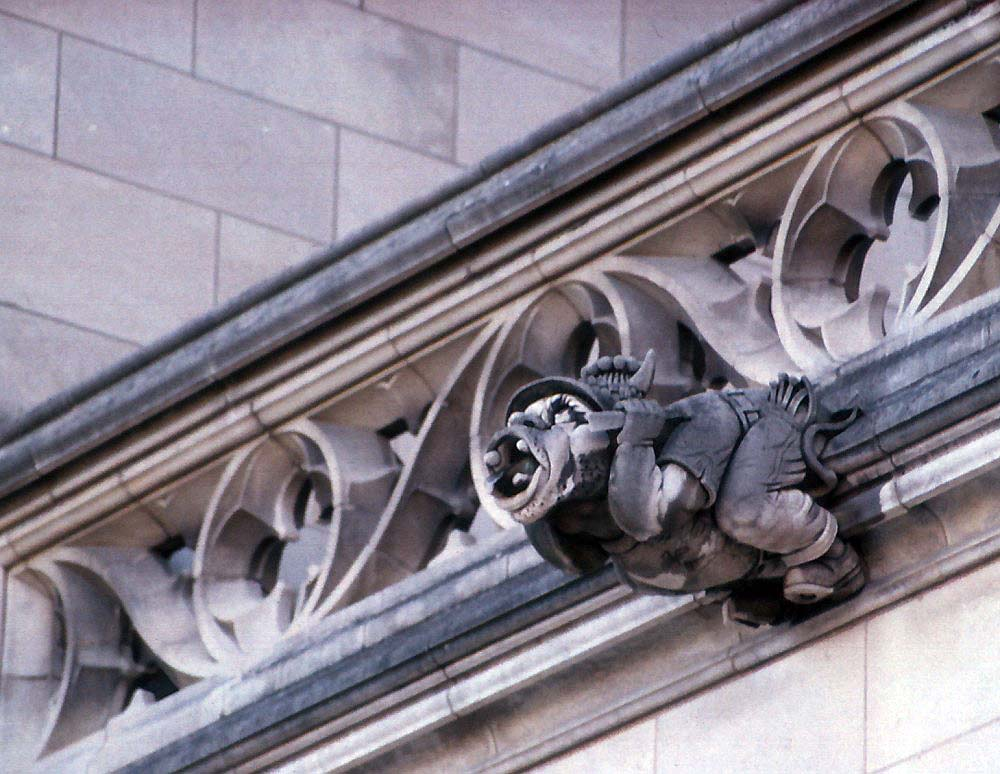
Gargoyle showing carver Roger Morigi with carver's tools, Washington National Cathedral, Washington D.C., USA

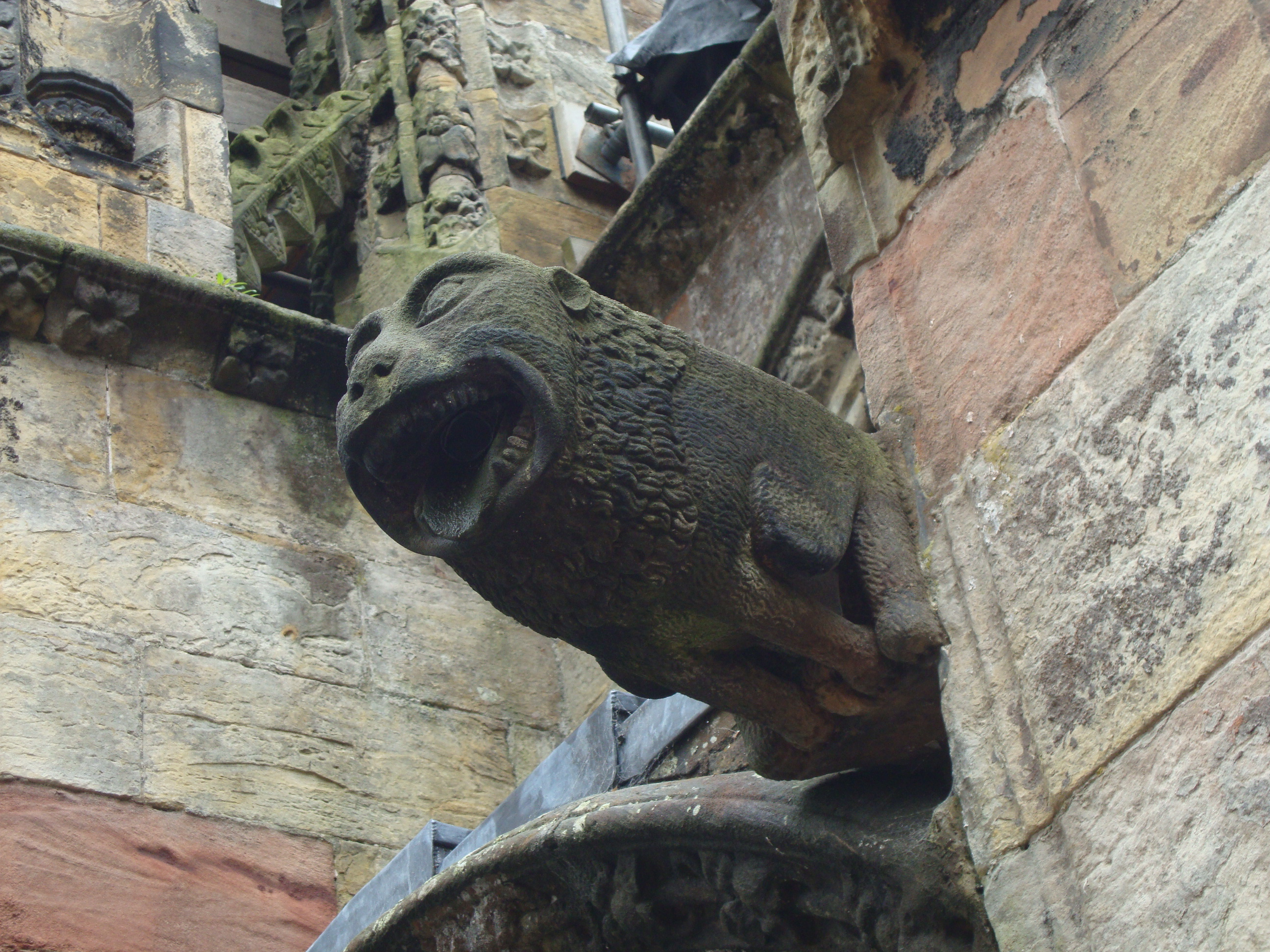
Gargoyle from Rosslyn Chapel, Roslin, Scotland.

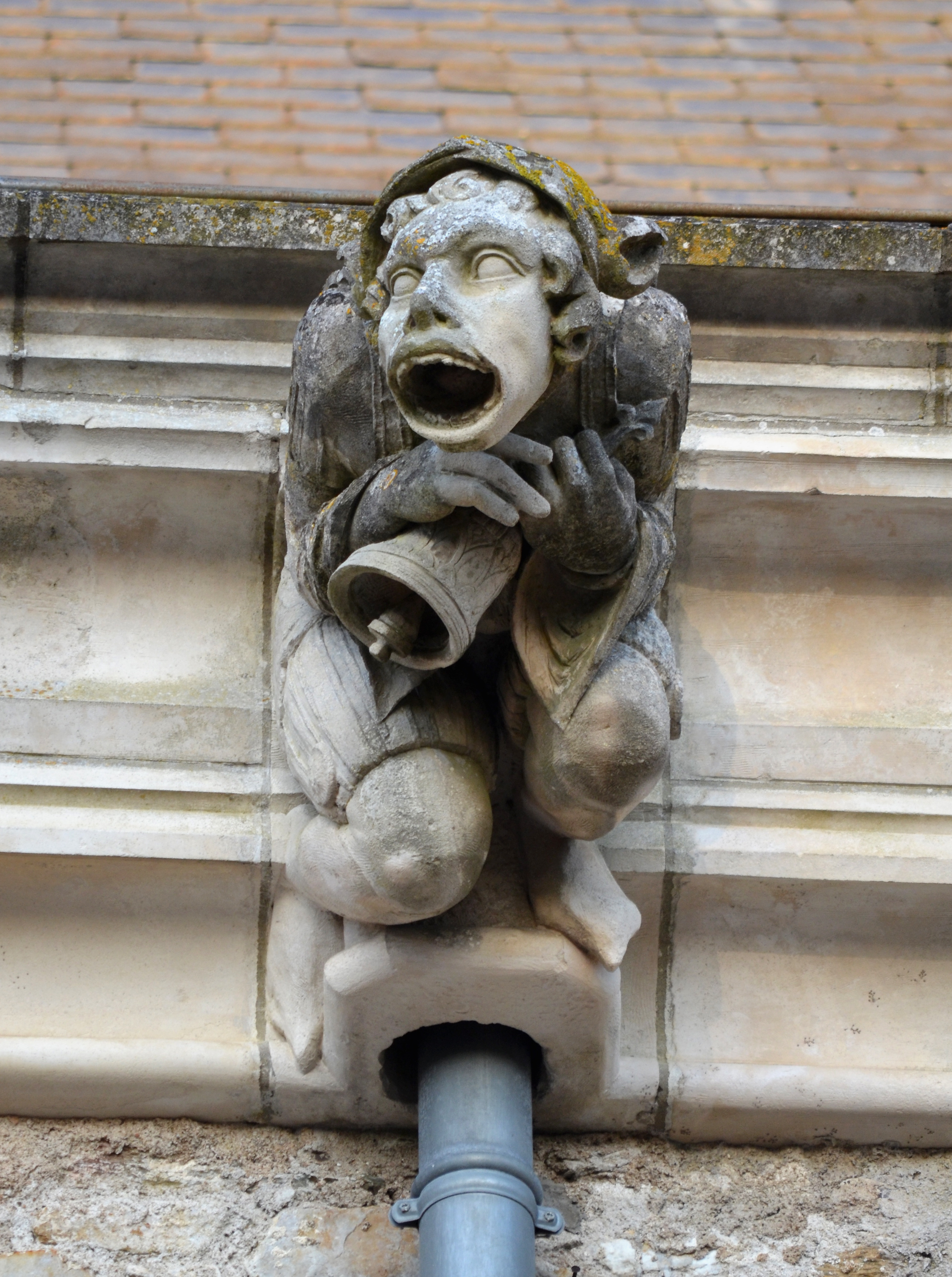
Gargoyle from the Château de Blain, France

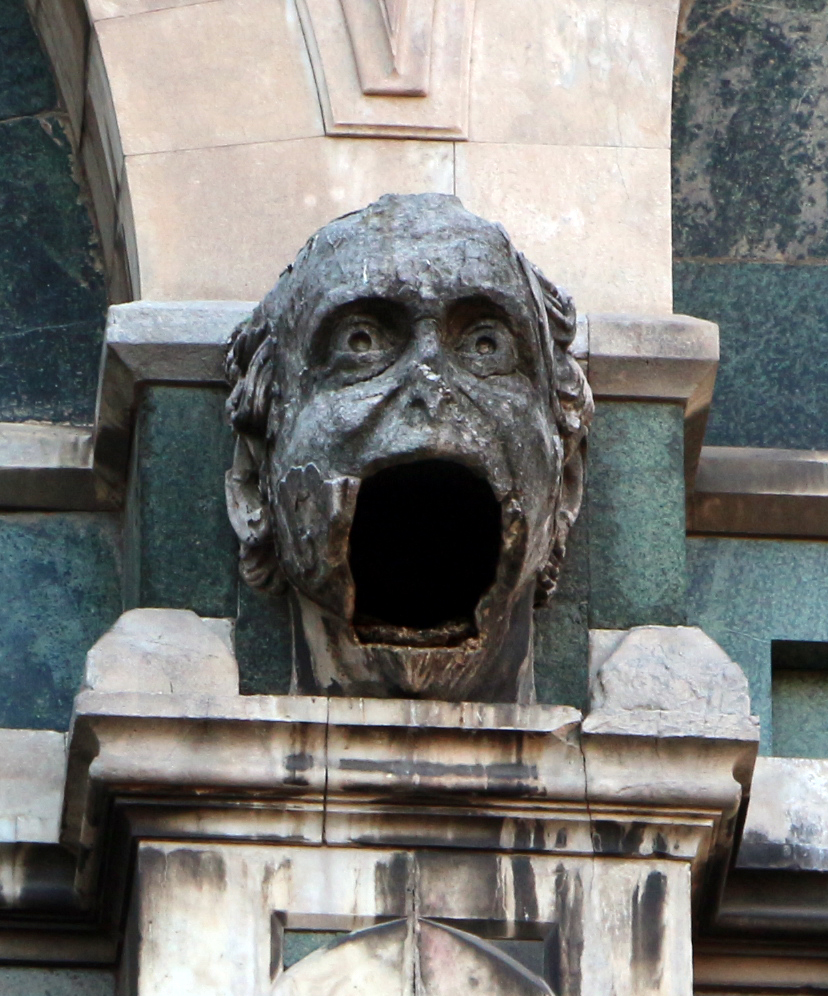
Gargoyle from Santa Maria del Fiore, Florence, Italy (sometimes called "il Boccalone")

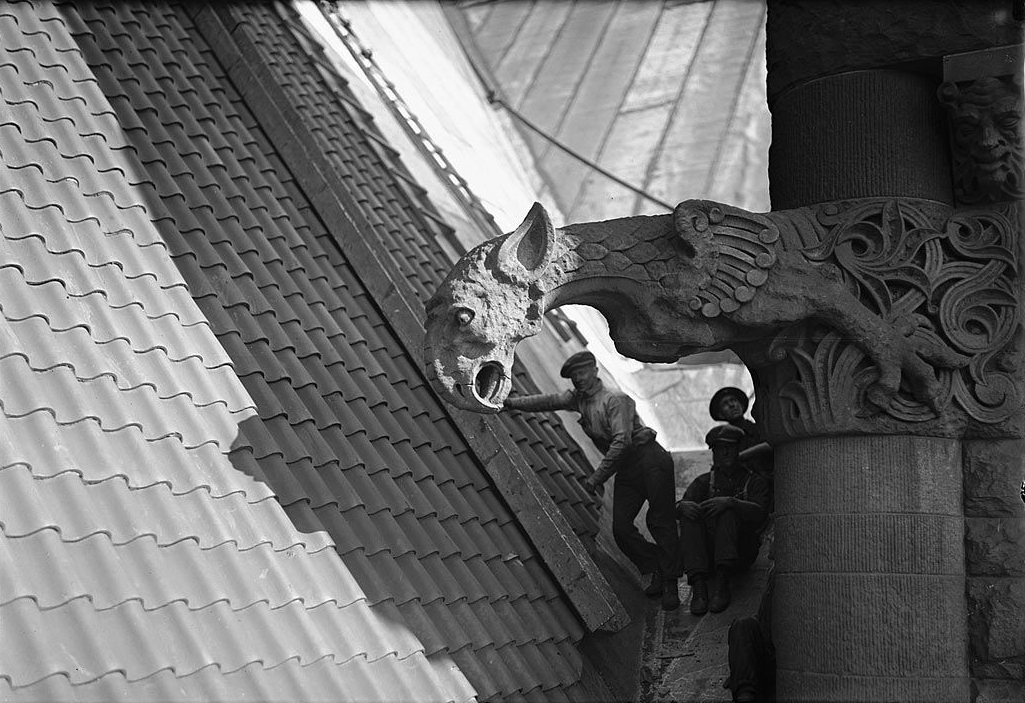
Original Old City Hall, Toronto gargoyle

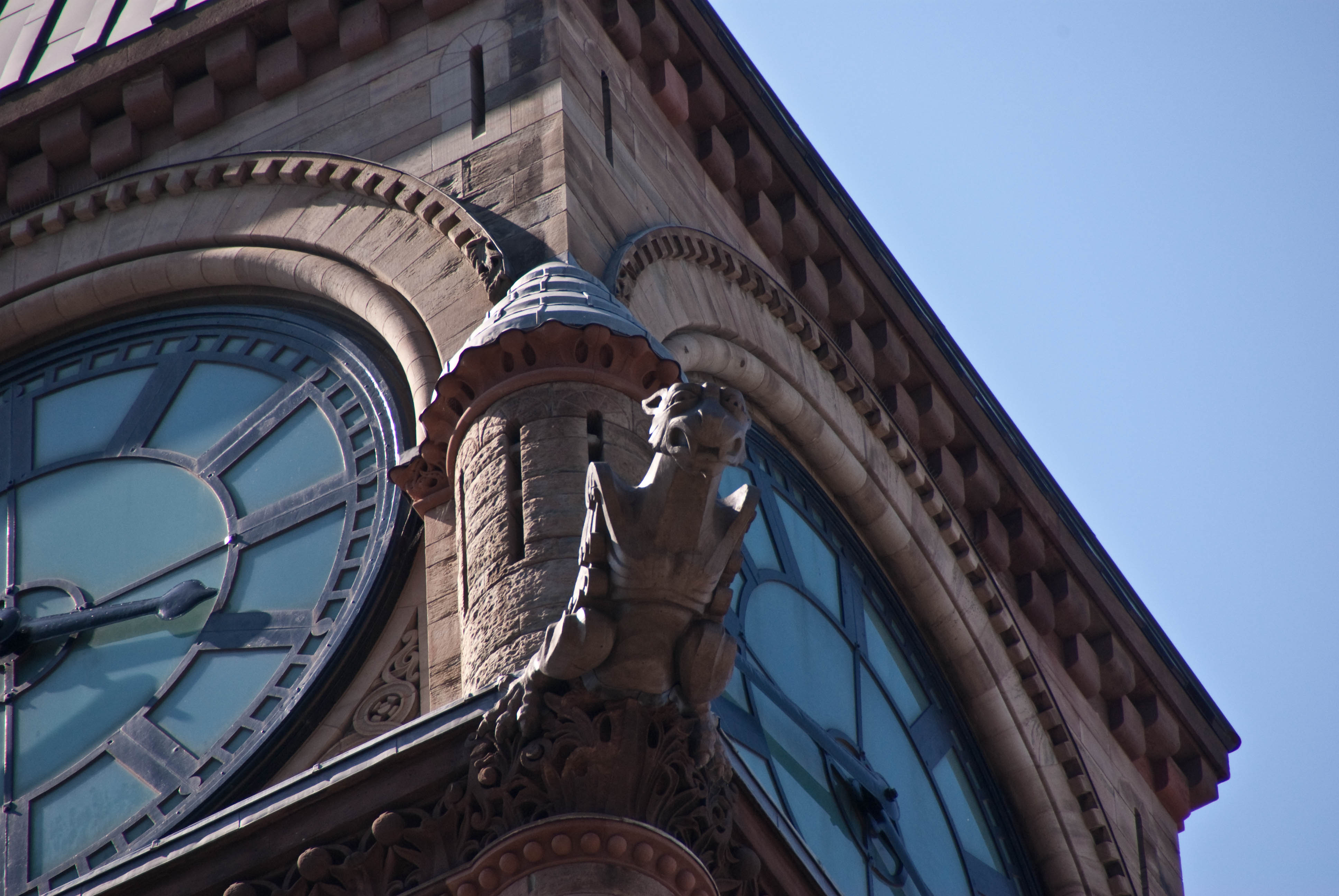
Replica gargoyles at Old City Hall, Toronto

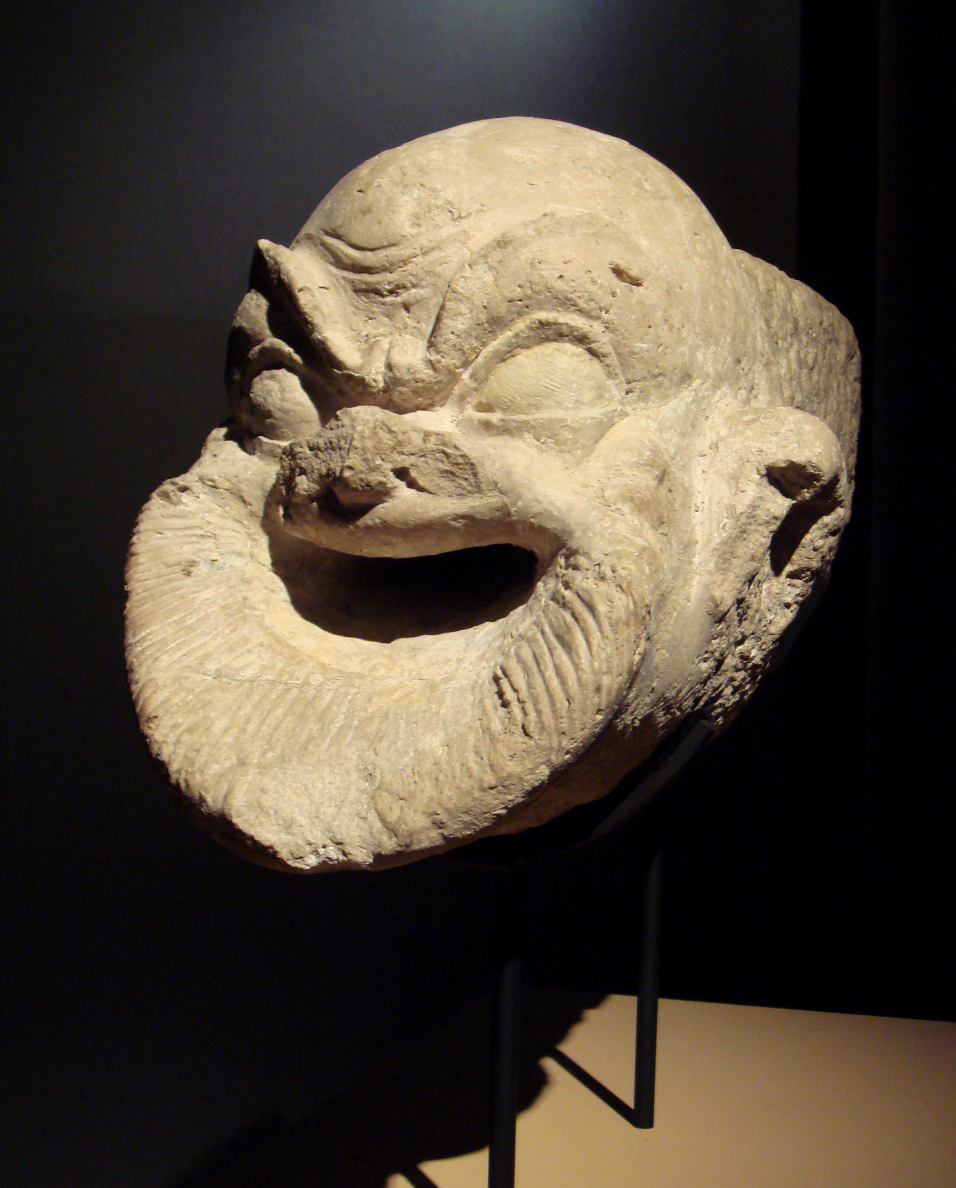
A 1st century BC Hellenistic gargoyle representing a comical cook-slave from Ai Khanoum, Afghanistan

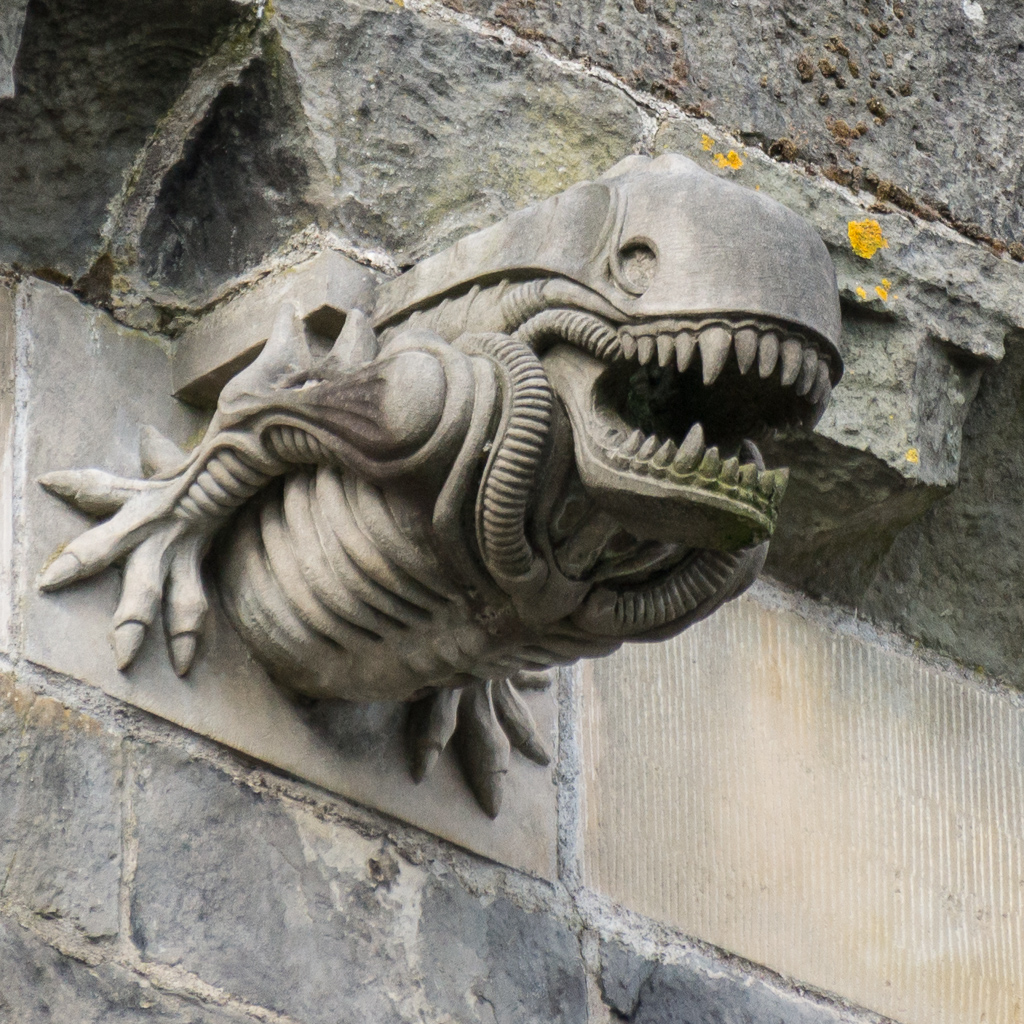
During a refurbishment of Paisley Abbey in the early 1990s, twelve gargoyles were replaced. One of them is modeled on the titular creature from the 1979 film Alien.

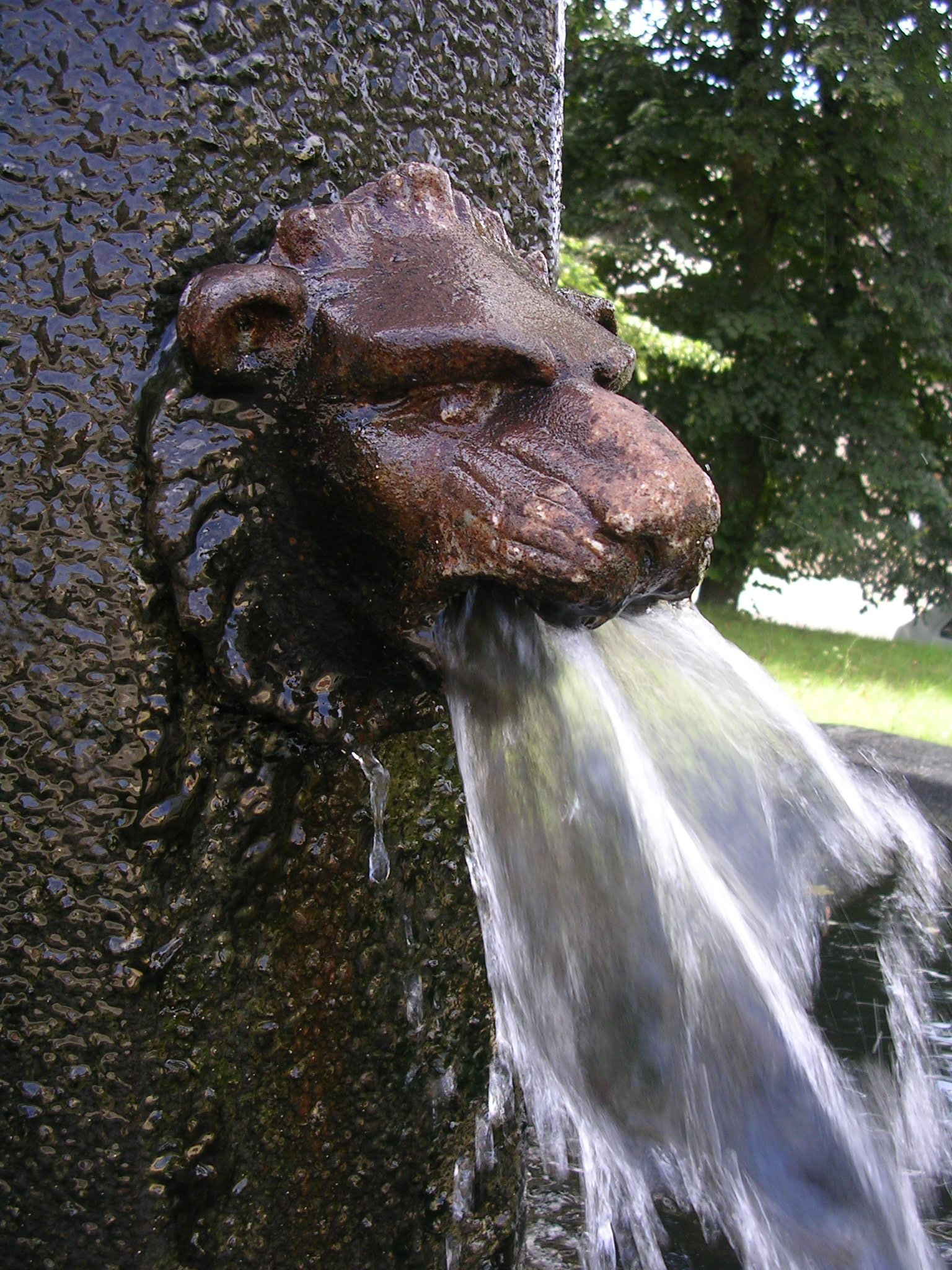
Gargoyle spewing water as part of a fountain Prčice, Sedlec-Prčice, Příbram District, Central Bohemian Region, the Czech Republic. Vítek's Square

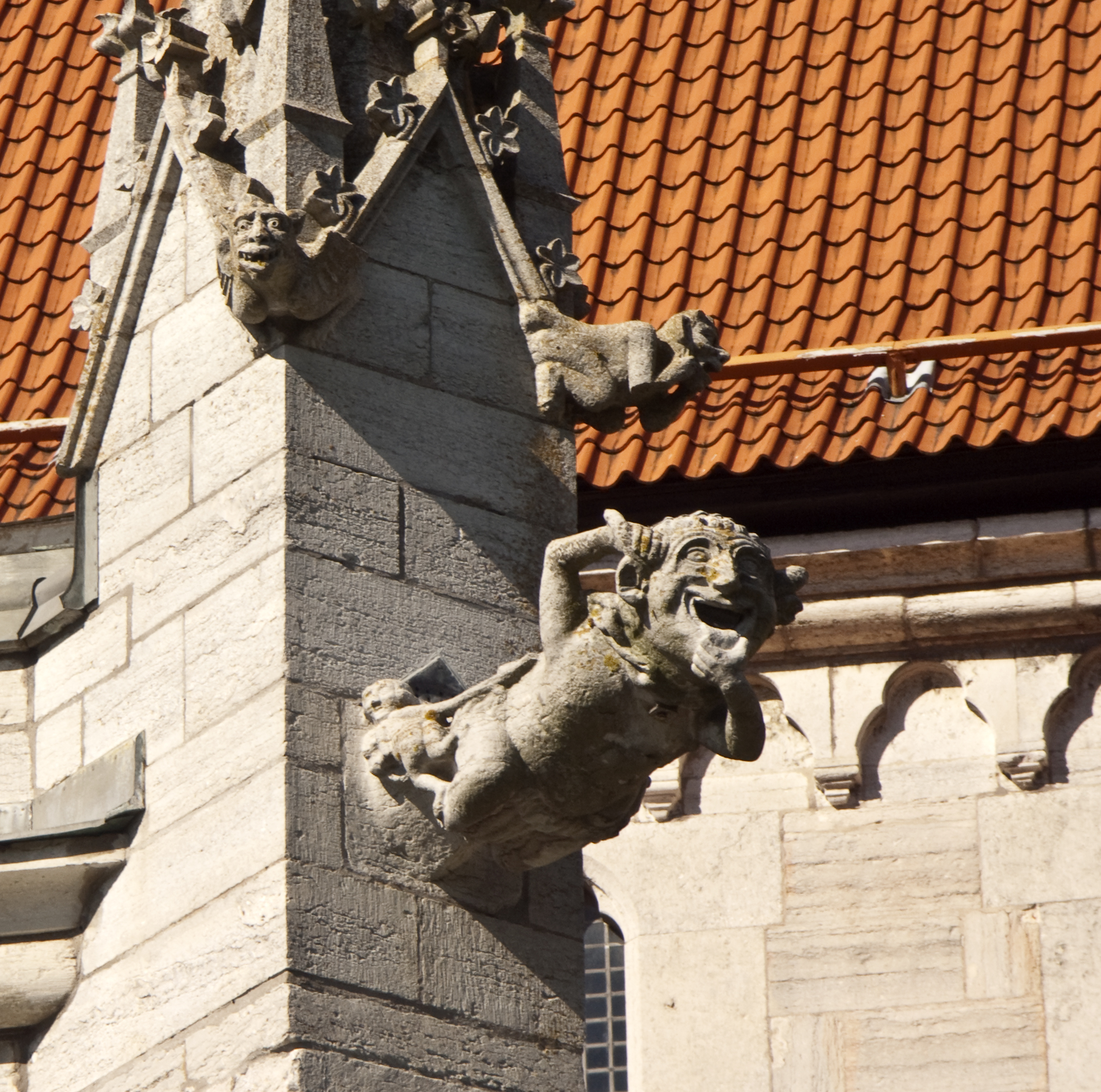
Gargoyle representing a comical demon at the base of a pinnacle with two smaller gargoyles, Visby, Sweden

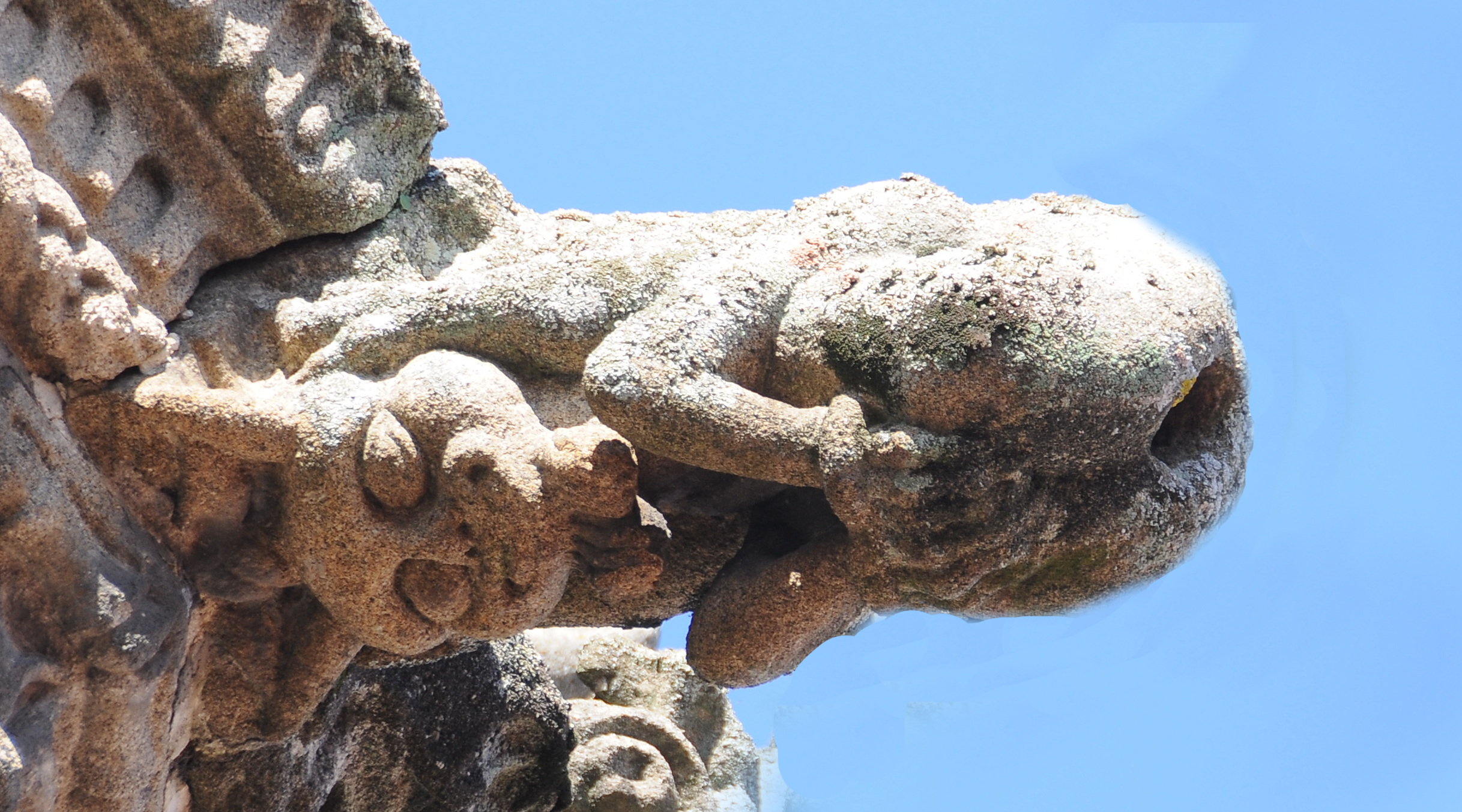
Gargoyle appearing to defecate

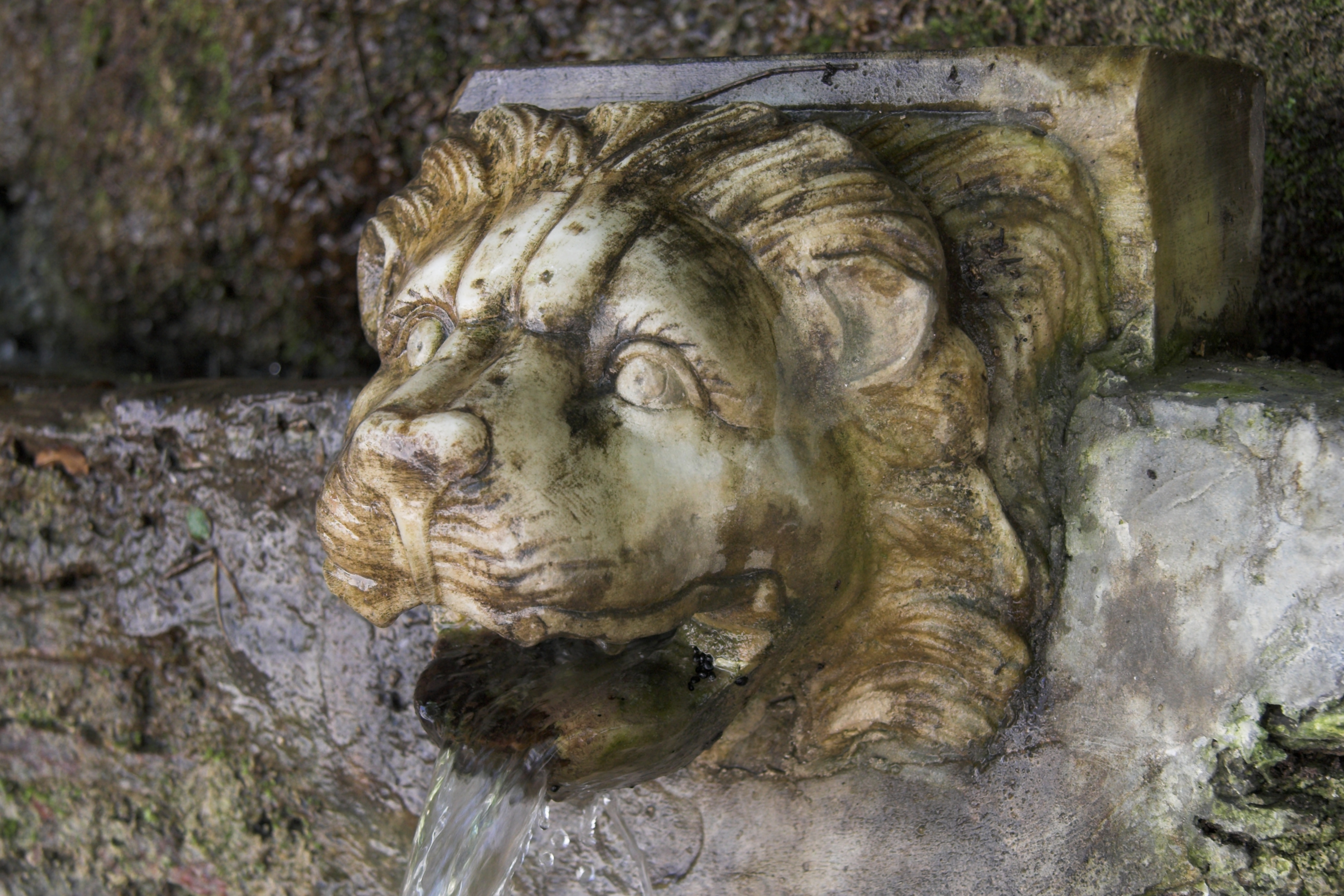
Lion Grotesque

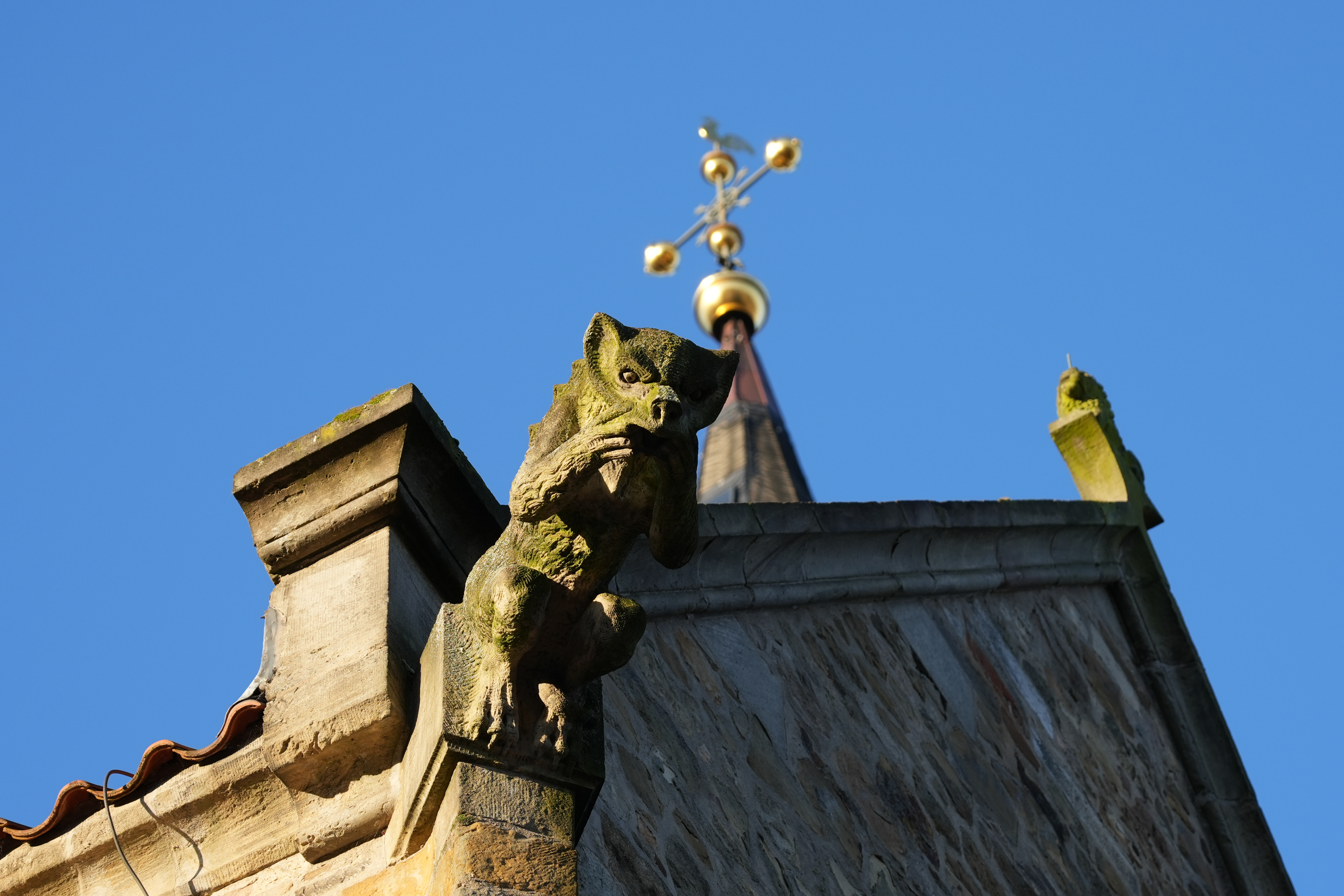
Gargoyle from Saint John's Church, Herford with the steeple ball in the background

== See also ==
- Architectural sculpture
- Chiwen
- Nightmares in the Sky – Coffee table book by Stephen King and f-stop Fitzgerald
- Rainhead
- Sheela na gig
- Animal representation in Western medieval art
