= Woolston Manor =

Estate in Somerset, England

Woolston Manor Farmhouse
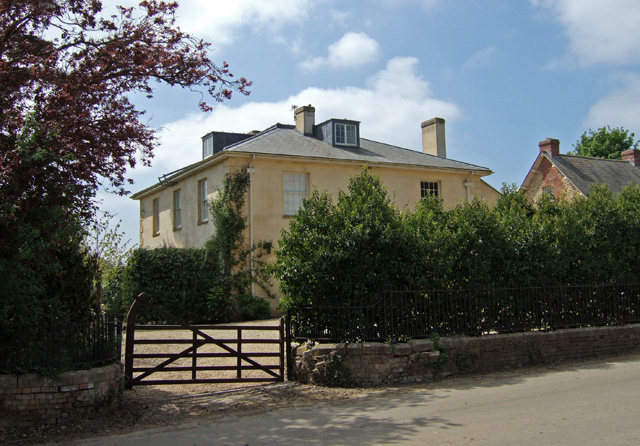
- Woolston Manor Farmhouse in May 2007

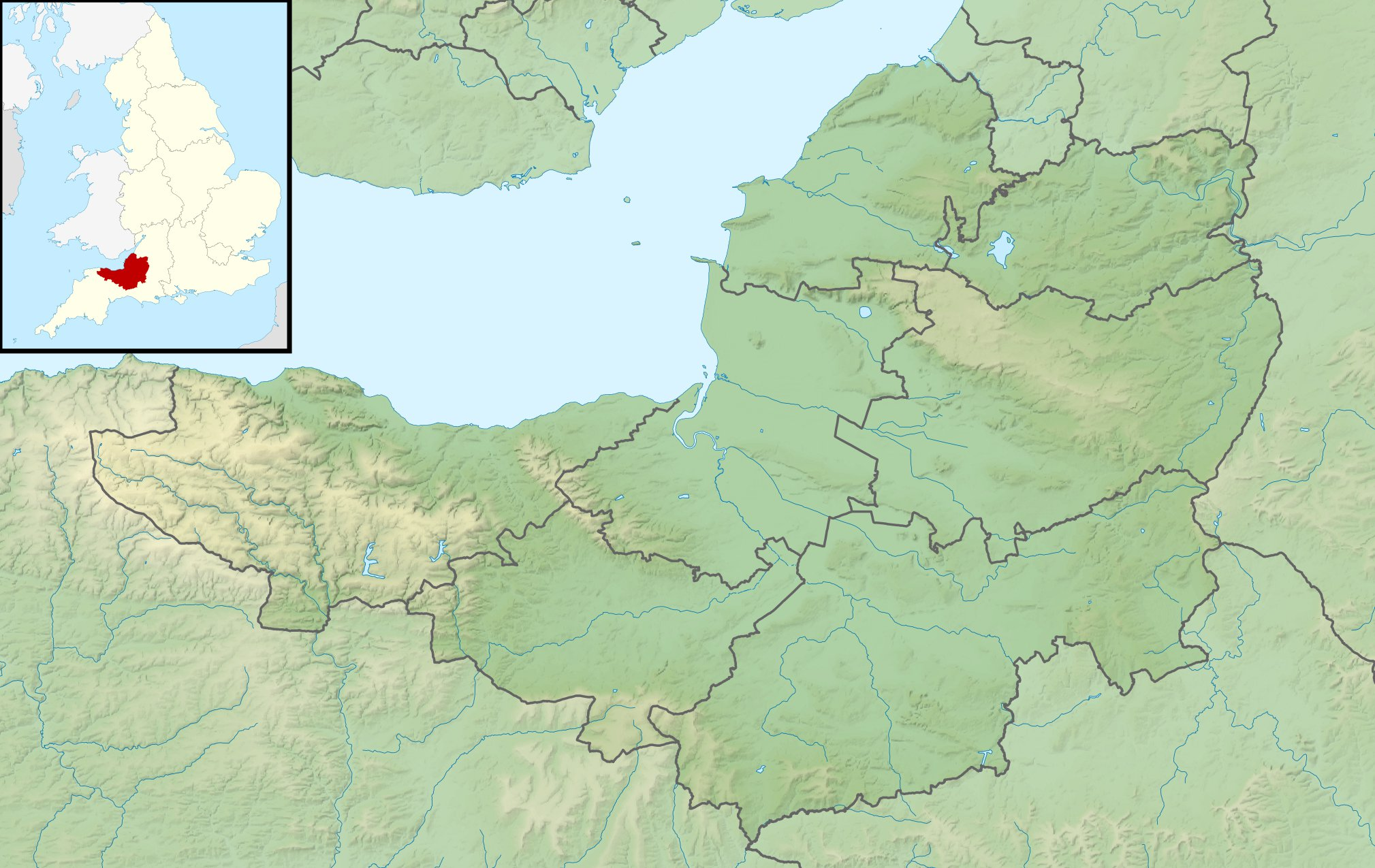
- Location within Somerset

General information
- Classification: Grade II listed
- Location: England
- Coordinates: 51.0473°N 2.4912°W
- Opened: 1838

Technical details
- Material: Stone
- Floor count: 2

Woolston Manor was an estate that covered about 230 acres (93 ha) in Somerset, England. It included arable land and pasturage, worked by a tenant farmer. The lands were later sold as a farm. The Woolston Manor Farmhouse is a large stone house completed in 1838 that replaced the earlier manor house. It is now a Grade II listed building.

== Location ==
Woolston Manor is in the Yarlington parish of South Somerset. The farm is in the valley on the southern boundary of the parish. The farm used to be on the outskirts of the village of Lower Woolston. The village has since been reduced to a few houses in the neighbouring parish of North Cadbury.

== History ==
The manor of Woolston may have originally been the estate of Ufetone that Drew de Montagu held from Robert, Count of Mortain, in 1086. The estate was assessed at more than 3 hides, including 2 1/2 ploughlands and a demesne with 10 acres (4.0 ha) of meadow and a flock of 66 sheep. A mill was recorded in 1086, but was not mentioned in later records. There are no records of any manor court for Woolston.

In 1166 the estate was held by Jordan Gwihaine from Drew de Montagu the Younger. It was passed down through the Gwihaine, Gwyene or Gyan family to Ellen Gyan, who married John Cammell in 1397. In 1565 Sir Henry Cammell sold it to Sir James FitzJames, and in 1568 he sold it to Thomas Chafyn. The Chafyns were a family with large estates in Dorset, Somerset and Wiltshire. The estate was called "Great Woolston, otherwise Woolston Gyon" in an early 17th century document, presumably after the Gyon family. The Chafyns sold the estate to James Harding of Mere, merchant, in 1746. Some of the Harding family were living on the estate as yeomen in the first quarter of the 19th century.

By 1725 the manor was in closes. In 1765 the farm consisted of all of the former manor, including land outside the parish, covering more than 250 acres (100 ha). The tenant had to keep sufficient sheep and had to maintain the old barn used for storing barley. In 1794 some of the land was to be improved by converting ploughed fields to pasture. In 1830 Stephen Harding offered the land for sale as a single farm. Joseph Goodenough bought the farm in 1835.

The former manor house seems to have been an asymmetrical two-storey building with four bays. Joseph Goodenough rebuilt the house further back from the road between 1835 and 1838. In 1838 the farm covered 231 acres (93 ha). A dairyman was employed by the farm in 1851, and a double cottage was used as a dairy in 1858. Goodenough sold it to Thomas Rogers in 1858, who united the lordship to his Yarlington Manor. William Osborne, farmer, was listed as the tenant in 1883. The tenant in 1905 had to provide straw to the landlord, had to maintain the orchard and could not use barbed wire. The farm, but not the lordship, was sold by Virginia Rogers in 1962.

== Building ==
The house is built of rendered and ashlar-lined local stone. The roof is hipped and covered in Welsh slate. The style is that of a two-storey villa, with each wall divided into three bays. The sash windows have 16 panes, with plain frames. The central doorway has a reeded architrave and a six-panel door with a rectangular fanlight above. There is a low brick wall with Flemish bond 6 metres (20 ft) north of the house with ashlar copings. The wall is capped with ornamental wrought-iron railings. The house has been divided into two dwellings. It has been a Grade II listed building since 18 March 1986.

== Sources ==
- Baggs, A. P.; Sirau, M. C. (1999), "Yarlington", in C R J Currie and R W Dunning (ed.), A History of the County of Somerset, vol. 7, Bruton, Horethorne and Norton Ferris Hundreds, London – via British History Online
- Kelly, E.R. (1883), Kelly's Directory of Somersetshire: With the City of Bristol, Kelly & Company
- Rogers, Thomas Englesby (1890), Records of Yarlington; being the history of a country village, London: Elliot Stock
- Woolston Manor farmhouse, and front boundary wall with railings, Historic England
