= St Catherine's Church, Fivehead =

Church in Somerset, England

Church of St Catherine
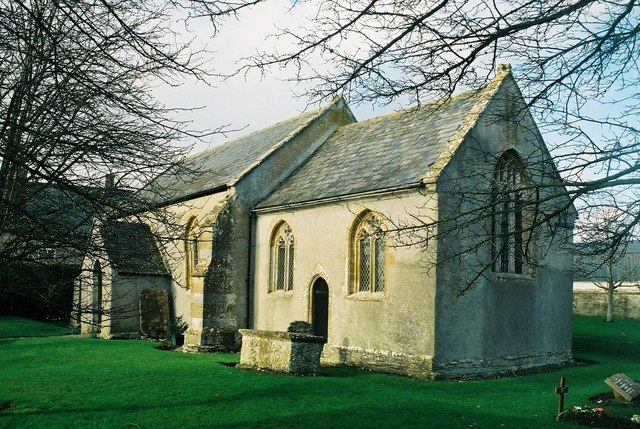

- Location within Somerset
- 51°00′30″N 2°54′01″W
- Location: Fivehead, Somerset, England

History
- Built: 12th century

Listed Building – Grade I
- Official name: Church of St Catherine
- Designated: 17 April 1959
- Reference no.: 1249584

The Church of St Catherine in Swell Lane, Fivehead, Somerset, England dates from the 12th century and has been designated as a Grade I listed building.

It has a three-bay nave and two bay chancel. The vane is supported by buttresses. The door in the south porch has a Norman, Romanesque chevron arch.

The six bells were restored in 2007. The interior includes a Norman font and has a Jacobean pulpit from 1634.

The church is adjacent to Swell Court Farmhouse which is also Grade I listed. In the churchyard are two chest tombs, one dated 1619, which are also listed buildings.

The parish is within the benefice of Curry Rivel with Fivehead and Swell which is part of the Diocese of Bath and Wells.

== See also ==
- List of Grade I listed buildings in South Somerset
- List of towers in Somerset
- List of ecclesiastical parishes in the Diocese of Bath and Wells
