= Fivehead =

Village and civil parish in Somerset, England

Coordinates: 50.9982°N 2.9205°W

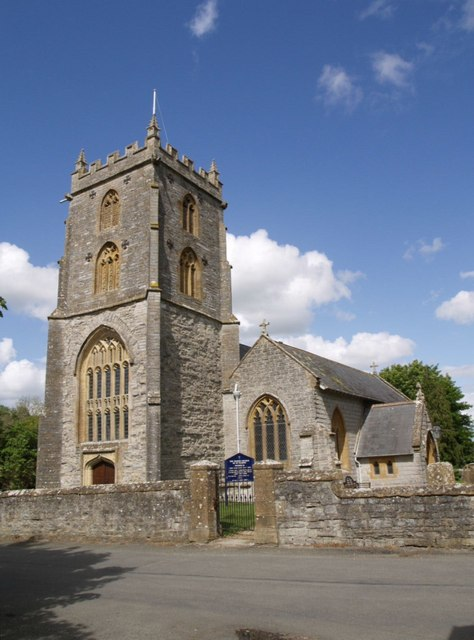
- Church of St Martin, Fivehead

- Location within Somerset
- Population: 609 (2011)
- OS grid reference: ST355225
- Unitary authority: Somerset Council
- Ceremonial county: Somerset
- Region: South West
- Country: England
- Sovereign state: United Kingdom
- Post town: TAUNTON
- Postcode district: TA3
- Police: Avon and Somerset
- Fire: Devon and Somerset
- Ambulance: South Western
- UK Parliament: Glastonbury and Somerton

Fivehead is a village and civil parish in Somerset, England, situated on the Fivehead River, 8 miles (12.9 km) east of Taunton. In 2011 the parish, which includes the hamlet of Swell, had a population of 609.

== History ==
The name of the village comes from a Domesday manor which measured five hides (about 600 acres (242.8 ha).

Fivehead was part of the hundred of Abdick and Bulstone.

Swell Court Farmhouse dates from the mid to late 15th century.

Cathanger manor house dates from 1559, with Langford Manor having been built around the same period.

Nearby was RAF Merryfield, a World War II airfield.

== Governance ==
The parish council has responsibility for local issues, including setting an annual precept (local rate) to cover the council's operating costs.

For local government purposes, since 1 April 2023, the parish comes under the unitary authority of Somerset Council. Prior to this, it was part of the non-metropolitan district of South Somerset (established under the Local Government Act 1972). It was part of Langport Rural District before 1974.

Fivehead is also part of a county constituency represented in the House of Commons of the Parliament of the United Kingdom. It elects one Member of Parliament (MP) by the first past the post system of election.

== Geography ==
There are two nearby Sites of Special Scientific Interest at Fivehead Arable Fields and Fivehead Woods and Meadow.

== Religious sites ==
The Church of St. Catherine in Swell Lane dates from the 12th century, while the Church of St. Martin in the village is slightly more recent dating from the 13th century. Both are grade I listed buildings.

== Notable residents ==
- John Barnwell – Somerset cricketer died in the village in 1998.
