= Church of St Mary the Virgin, Isle Abbotts =

Church in Somerset, England

Church of St Mary the Virgin
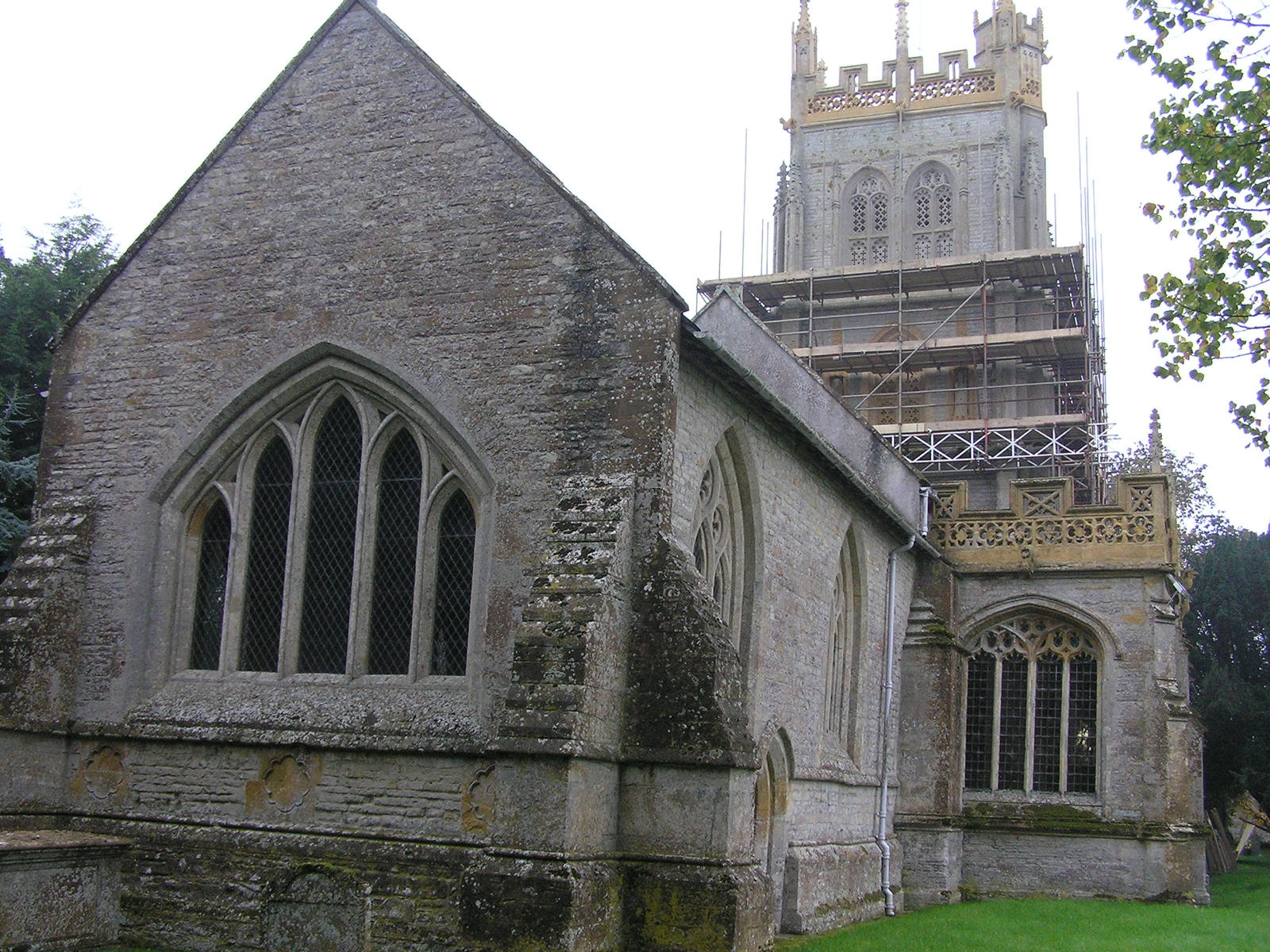

- Location within Somerset
- 50°59′02″N 2°55′21″W
- Location: Isle Abbotts, Somerset, England

History
- Built: 13th century

Listed Building – Grade I
- Official name: Church of St Mary the Virgin
- Designated: 17 April 1959
- Reference no.: 1249594

The Church of St Mary the Virgin in Isle Abbotts, Somerset, England dates from the 13th century with several restorations since. It has been designated as a Grade I listed building.

It has a tower of four stages. The embattled parapet is pierced by quatrefoils, the merlons pierced with lancet openings. The very large corner pinnacles have attached secondary pinnacles, and intermediate pinnacles to each side. The crocketted niches to each face of tower have surviving medieval figures, to west the risen Christ stepping from His sarcophagus, the Blessed Virgin with Bambino, St Peter and St Paul; to south St George, St Catherine, St Margaret; to east St John Baptist, St Clement; to north St Michael. The wealth of architectural detail and sculpture has required specific approaches to the methodology of repair and protection using lime-based materials. On the stonework are hunky punks which have been severely damaged by the weather, however one appears to be a person playing bagpipes.

== See also ==
- List of Grade I listed buildings in South Somerset
- List of towers in Somerset
- List of ecclesiastical parishes in the Diocese of Bath and Wells
