= Fivehead Arable Fields =

Protected area in Somerset, England

- Site of Special Scientific Interest
- Location within Somerset
- Location of Fivehead Arable Fields.
- Area of search: Somerset
- Grid reference: ST337224
- Coordinates: 50.99716°N 2.94615°W
- Interest: Biological
- Area: 10.3 hectares (0.103 km^{2}; 0.040 sq mi)
- Notification date: 1990

Fivehead Arable Fields (grid reference ST337224) is a 10.3 hectare (25.4 acre) biological Site of Special Scientific Interest near the village of Fivehead in Somerset, notified in 1990.

This site has one of the most important assemblages of arable weeds in Britain, several of which are now nationally rare or scarce. There is a large population of the nationally rare Broad-fruited Cornsalad (Valerianella rimosa).
