= Steeple ball =

Distinctive finial feature

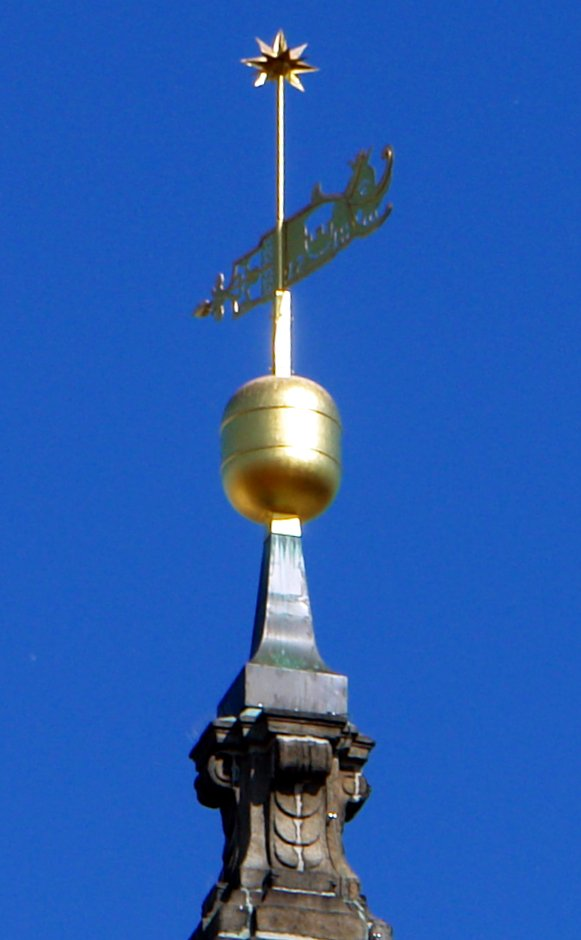
Steeple ball on the Reichenturm in Bautzen is located below the weathervane

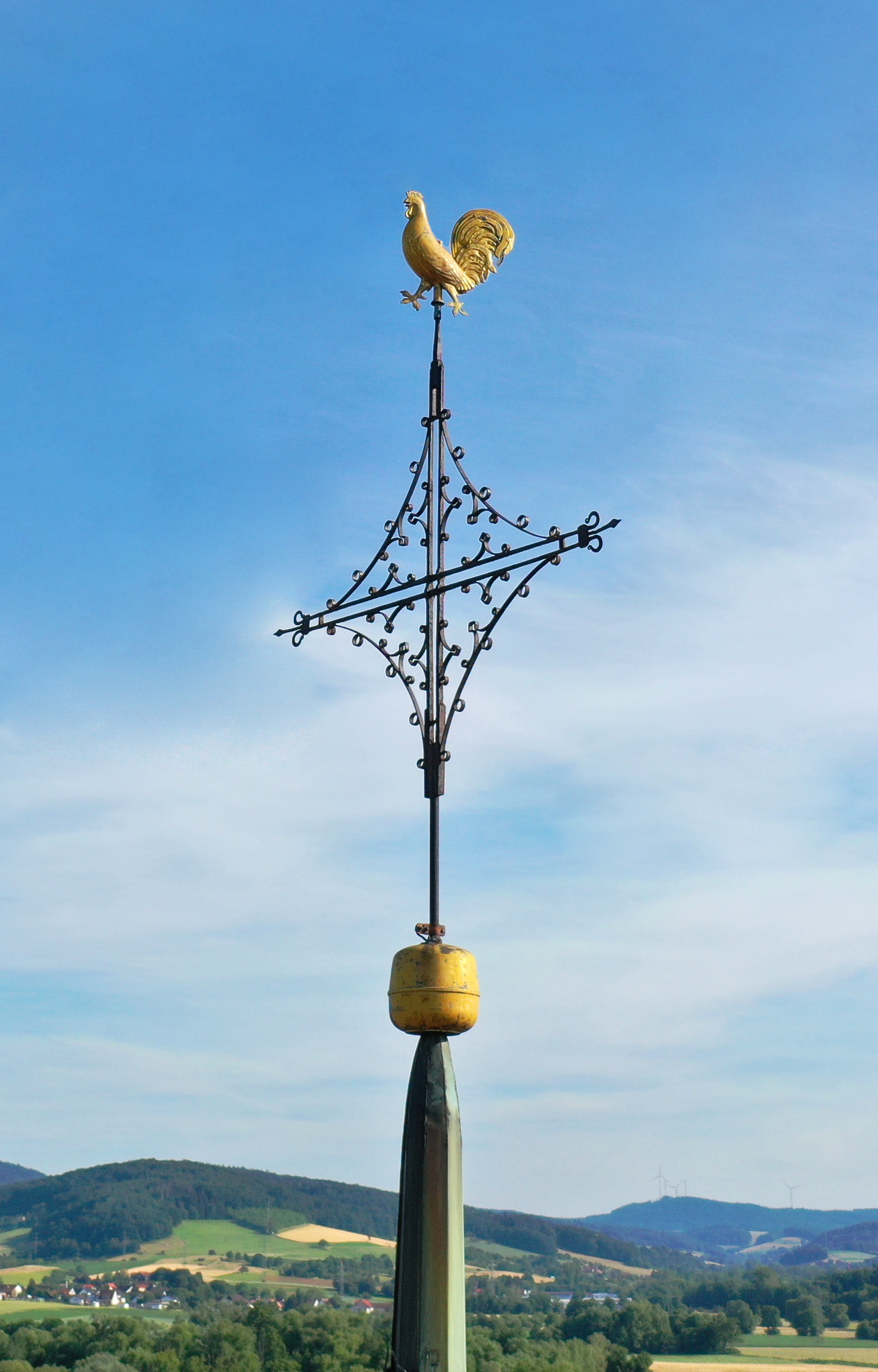
Steeple ball and traditional bird-shaped weather vane (Wetterhahn) on the church in Brensbach

The steeple ball (also tower ball from German: Turmkugel) is a closed, typically rounded, capsule on the finial of many buildings in the German-speaking countries. A steeple ball is highly visible and hard to reach for repairs, so attention is paid to the quality of design, construction, and materials. The combination of durability and inaccessibility makes the steeple ball attractive for use as a time capsule. When roofs are renovated or replaced, new items (most often newspapers or coins) are added to the existing ones.

Shiny and visible from many places in the city, capsules are also used as target points during geodetic surveying.

Installing the steeple ball is one of the final steps in building or renovating a church roof. This event is often celebrated with a so-called Kugelfest.

== See also ==
- Time ball

== Sources ==
- Colombi (2011). Die Turmakten von Luzern (in German). Books on Demand. ISBN 978-3-8391-7460-9.
- Anne-Chantal Zimmermann: Briefkästen und Zeitkapseln. Eine kleine Geschichte der Turmkugeln des Rathauses von Sursee. Masterarbeit, 2010.
- Kümin, Beat (1 June 2021). "Nachrichten für die Nachwelt. Turmkugelarchive in der Erinnerungskultur des deutschsprachigen Europa" (PDF). Historische Zeitschrift (in German). 312 (3): 614–648. doi:10.1515/hzhz-2021-0014. eISSN 2196-680X. ISSN 0018-2613. S2CID 235258601.
