= Fivehead Woods and Meadow =

Protected area in Somerset, England

- Site of Special Scientific Interest
- Location within Somerset
- Location of Fivehead Woods and Meadow.
- Area of search: Somerset
- Grid reference: ST331231
- Coordinates: 51.00338°N 2.95483°W
- Interest: Biological
- Area: 62.4 hectares (0.624 km^{2}; 0.241 sq mi)
- Notification date: 1989

Fivehead Woods and Meadow (grid reference ST331231) is a 62.4 hectare (154.2 acre) biological Site of Special Scientific Interest near the village of Fivehead in Somerset, notified in 1989.

This woodland complex is situated on a ridge of land overlooking West Sedgemoor. The site includes a large breeding colony of grey herons (Ardea cinerea) in one of the woods and breeding pairs of nightingales (Luscinia megarhynchos) as well. Buzzards (Buteo buteo), and sparrowhawks (Accipiter nisus) also breed. The common dormouse (Muscardinus avellanarius), a rare species, is found in at least one of the woods. Swell Wood, which is part of the site, is a Royal Society for the Protection of Birds (RSPB) Reserve.
