= Hunky punk =

Decorative carvings on English buildings

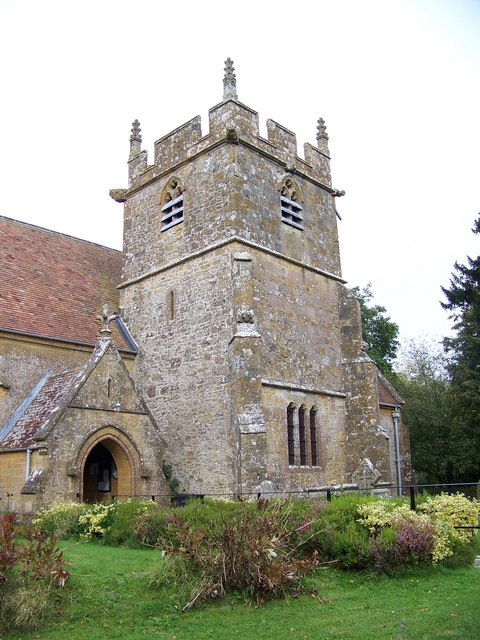
The 15th-century tower of St Mary, Yarlington, Somerset, with crocket pinnacles and hunky punks on the corners.

A hunky punk is a grotesque carving on the side of a building, especially Late Gothic churches. They occur at tower corners, on stair turrets and porches, and along string courses. Such features are especially numerous in Somerset (in the West Country of England).

Though similar in appearance to a gargoyle, a hunky punk is purely decorative, with no other functional purpose (often referred to as a grotesque). A gargoyle is not strictly a hunky punk, because a gargoyle serves to drain water off the roof through its mouth.

Many hunky punks depict crouching creatures, although their subjects also include human figures and musicians. At St Mary's Church, Isle Abbotts, the tower carvings include a bagpiper among animal and imaginary figures. Carvings on the south porch of St Andrew's Church, Curry Rivel, depict seated musicians playing bagpipes, a fiddle and an instrument identified as a shawm.

The origin of the term hunky punk has been ascribed to the words hunkers (meaning 'haunches') and punchy ('short-legged').

== Examples ==
The church tower of St Mary the Virgin, Isle Abbotts has eight hunky punks around its top. They depict a person playing the bagpipes; a lion-dog (Chinese guardian lion); a goat; a dragon; a Chinese dragon; a primitive dragon; a winged lion; and a lion.

== See also ==
- Church grim, a folklore spirit
- Sheela na gig, another architectural grotesque
