= Sieges of Bradford =

Civil War skirmishes in Bradford, England

- Part of English Civil War
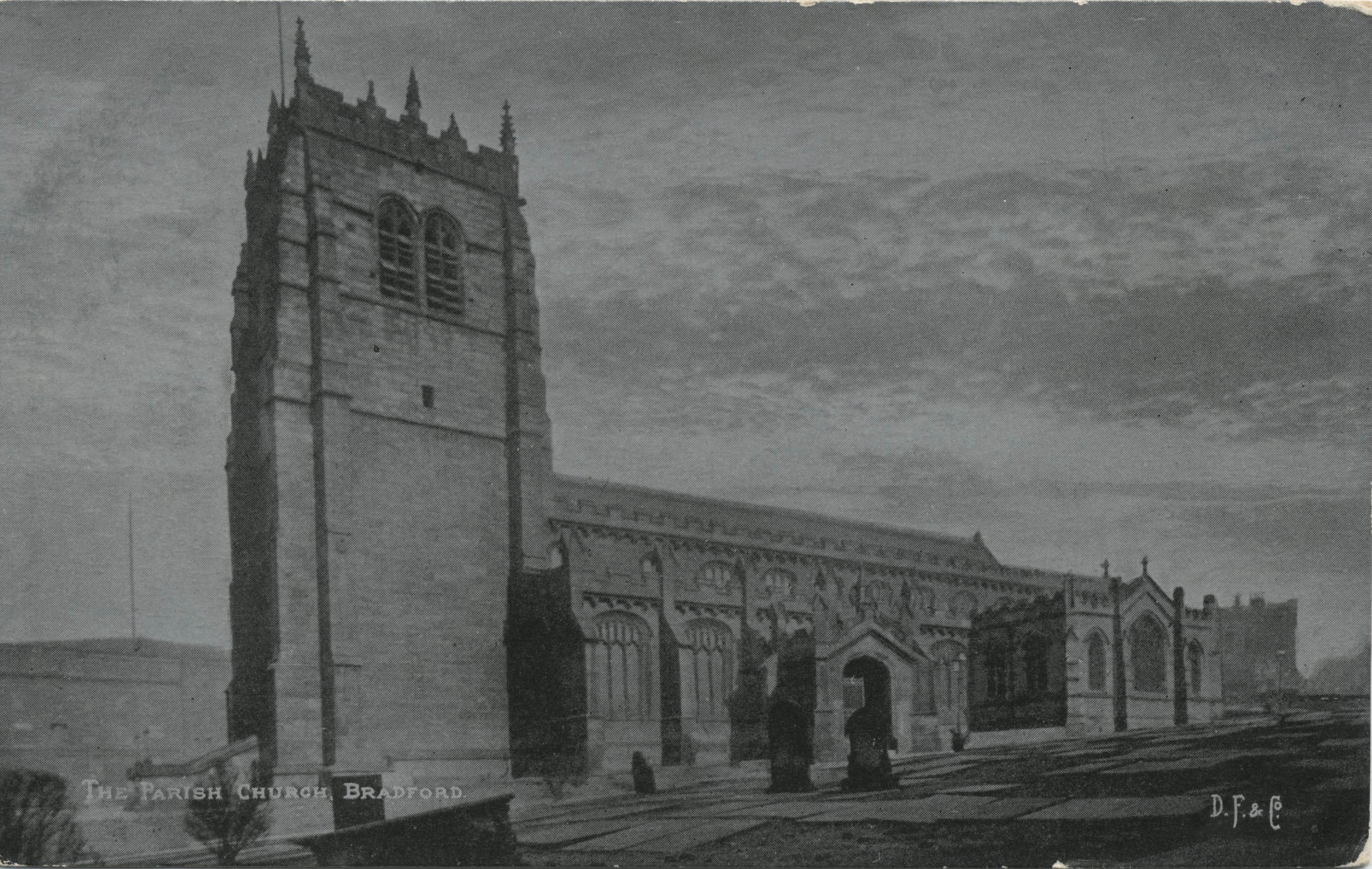
- Bradford parish church before extensions were added. This is mostly how the church would have looked in 1642.
Date	December 1642 (first siege); July 1643 (second siege)
Location	Bradford, West Yorkshire 53.795°N 1.747°W
Result	Parliamentary victory (1642); Royalist victory (1643)

Belligerents
Royalists	Parliamentarians
Earl of Newcastle (1643)	Sir Thomas Fairfax (1643)

Strength
Approximately 800 (1642)	Approximately 400 (1642)

Casualties and losses
Unknown	Unknown
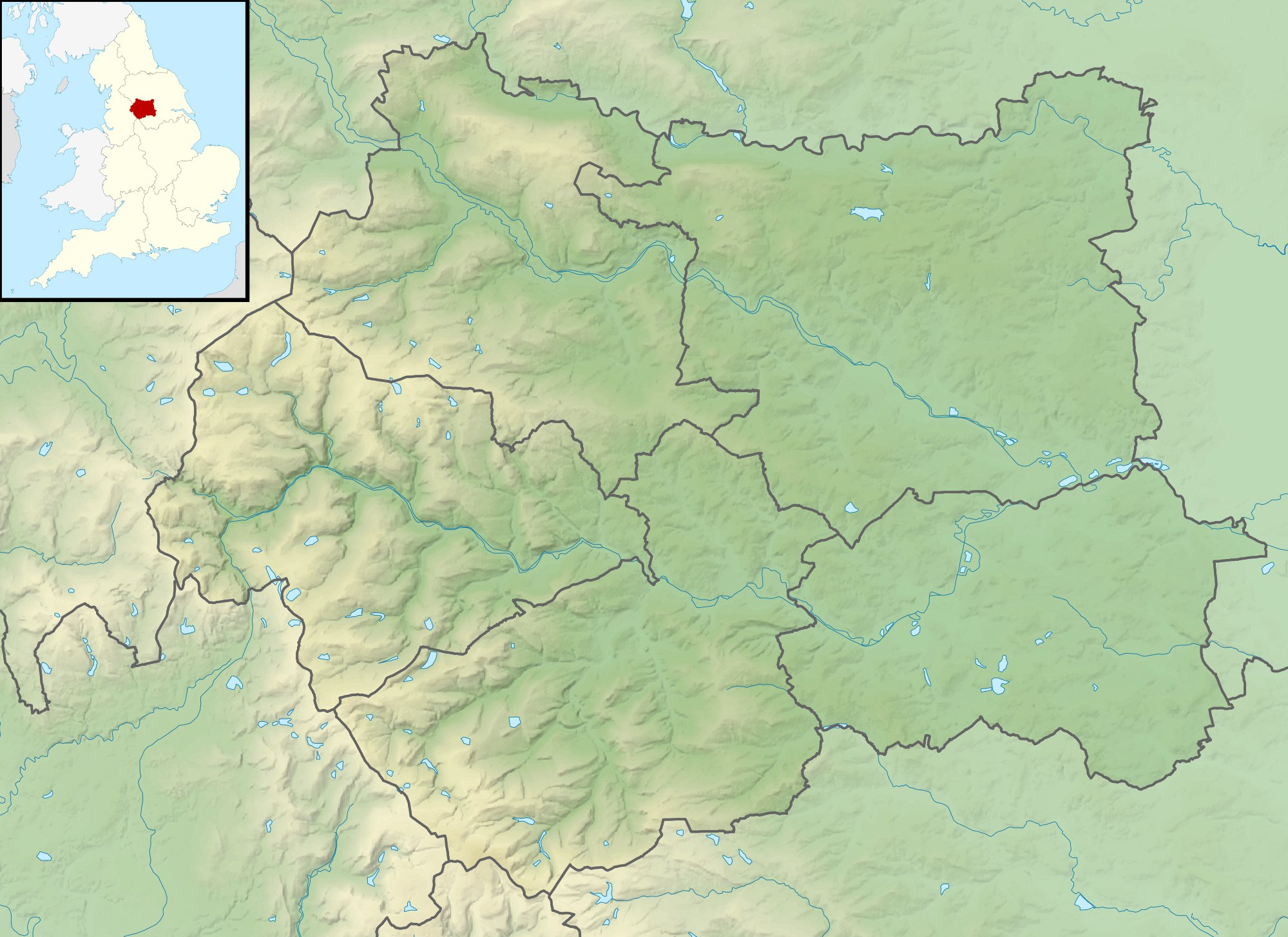
- Location of Bradford in West Yorkshire

The sieges of Bradford (also known as the Battle of the Steeple), were two very short-lived sieges that took place separately in the town of Bradford, Yorkshire, in December 1642 and early July 1643, just after the Royalist victories in Pontefract (1642), and the Battle of Adwalton Moor (1643) respectively. In the second siege, with the Parliamentarian forces dispersed to the west in and around Halifax, the Earl of Newcastle subjected Bradford to a brief siege to enforce rule and allegiance to the king.

The first siege gave rise to the term "Bradford Quarter", apparently a misinterpretation by the defenders of Bradford who, on hearing a Royalist officer asking for quarter, assured him that they would "quarter him". The term "give them Bradford Quarter", was used by the Royalists against the defenders of the Bradford during the second siege. The second siege was noted for its apparent salvation from slaughter after the Earl of Newcastle was visited by a wraith-like figure imploring him to "pity poor Bradford...".

The sieges were also notable in that to protect the church and steeple, bales of wool were hung from the tower in an effort to deflect, or deaden the impact of cannon-fire from the Royalists. The siege was said to have decimated Bradford and afterwards, famine and pestilence followed in its wake which affected Bradford for a hundred years. Some even state that as Bradford was withered, it allowed Leeds to flourish as the powerhouse in the region.

== Background ==
Bradford was subject to the fighting in the First English Civil War, between October 1642 and March 1644. The town was besieged twice in this period; firstly in December 1642 and again in July 1643. The settlement of Bradford in the 1640s was quite small and consisted of only three main roads; Ivegate, Kirkgate and Westgate. At that time, the inhabitants of Bradford were Puritans who were overwhelmingly in support of Parliament. There were many reasons for this; King Charles I of England had a Catholic wife and he himself was suspected of being a Catholic. Additionally, the manor of Bradford had been sold off to the citizens of London to pay for the king's debts, a high-church vicar with "papist sympathies" was installed in the parish church and the Tempest family, owners of Bolling Hall, had tried to tax Bradford's cloth industry for the benefit of people in the south of England. Further, economic problems had led to a problems in the cloth trade, which also produced bitter resentment towards the king.

Before the fighting began in earnest, Royalist troops were stationed in Bradford as it was known to be anti-royalist in its outlook. These troops were said to have been "brutal" to the inhabitants of Bradford, which is said to have only increased their hatred of the Royalist cause. The Royalist soldiers were withdrawn in 1642, and the local population set about erecting defences for when the troops came back;

...the generality of the town and parish, and the towns thereabout, stood up for Parliament, and it was made a little garrison, and though it was not easy to keep, yet they threw up bulwarks about it, and they were firm to the cause, and each other.

The Yorkshire region was the setting of many skirmishes, battles, sieges and that of personnel being raised for either side. Bradford itself was subject to an incursion in October 1642, when Royalists from Leeds attacked Lord Fairfax's recruiting headquarters.

=== The December 1642 siege ===
The first attack began in October 1642 when Royalist forces located in Leeds were ordered to attack Bradford, as it was known the locals were preparing defences. The Royalists set up two cannons in the Hunderscliffe (Undercliffe) area, which is north east of the church and on a hill about 1-mile (1.6 km) distant. Accordingly, after a brief skirmish which involved some cannon-fire from the Royalists, the engagement petered out due to a rapid change in the weather (snowfall and strong winds), and the destruction of one of the Royalist guns, which was described as having "burst asunder". The Royalists left soon afterwards going east to Leeds.

Later, on the 18 December, the Royalists again went to Bradford with "200 men of foot, six troops of dragoons, and five of horse", which meant that had about 800 men against half of that for the defenders. They positioned themselves in Barkerend (which was at that time a separate entity from Bradford proper, but which is now part of its urban sprawl). The defending forces garrisoned themselves around the church and hung woollen bales from the church to limit the damage from cannon fire; a contemporary woodcut from 1643 shows the tower of the church with six vertical rows of bales, by four across. The distance from their position in Barkerend to the church was described as being "as little as 300 paces", and so the protection of the wool, also meant that the defending side could position their "choicest marksmen' in the tower. During this first attack, an officer from the Royalist side charged down the hill on his horse meaning to launch an attack on the church and those within. He was beaten down by the Parliamentarians, and when he cried out for "quarter", the townsfolk are said to have misinterpreted his plea for mercy, to one where he was asking to be quartered. (Note: Newman points out that the defenders at that time were local men from Bradford, Halifax and Bingley, and not professional soldiers. Whilst he does not condone the treatment of the officer cut down, he makes the point regarding the inexperience of the defenders in the rules of war (as they were observed for the time) and that "the killing was done more out of panic and in hot-blood rather than cold, but the Royalists never forgot or forgave what had happened". This event also gave rise to a false account stating that the slaughtered officer was either the Earl of Newport, or his son. However, in 1650, the Earl and his two sons could be accounted for. Grainge states that the unfortunate officer, Sir John Harp, "being in a little advance of his men, fell into an ambuscade [and] seeing no chance of escape, begged for quarter...") This became known as "Bradford Quarter". The attack ended up with the Royalists being driven back and retreating, with Sir John Goodricke being taken prisoner, and receiving Bastinado (a foot-whipping). Twenty-five other Royalists were taken prisoner, and Colonel Goring was wounded, but believed to have returned to the Royalist side.

Newman asserts that the credit for this Parliamentarian victory was given to Fairfax, even though he had ridden away before the skirmishes occurred, and had not taken part in the defence of Bradford. However, the propaganda element of the story, ordinary men pitted against professional soldiers and winning, was seen to encourage those towards the Parliamentarian cause, and by some, as having God on their side. Newman states, that despite all of this, in actuality, the Royalists lost because they were over-confident, used only a small part of their available strength, and were against a largely leaderless crowd of men who were fighting for their homes, families and livelihoods. This siege was also known as the Battle of the Steeple, due to the defensive measures taken to protect the church during the battle.

=== The July 1643 siege ===
Sir Thomas Fairfax was in the town for a while during the summer of 1643, but he was convinced the town could not withstand a siege by the estimated 10,000 Royalists approaching from the east, so rode out to meet them with his 3,000–4,000 men. Fairfax had hoped to have been sent the 6,000 men who were at Nottingham waiting. However, he was denied these forces by Captain John Hotham, (Note: Hotham later 'defected' to the Royalist side, and was later tried for this, being found guilty on 24 December 1644, and executed on 1 January 1645.) who had convinced the other Parliamentary leaders in Nottingham that the threat lay in the Midlands, not Yorkshire. Fairfax demanded that the troops be sent north in a letter to Hotham, stating he should march north;

with all the forces you have, and join with me to suppress this Popish army here, which else, whatsoever report gives it out to you, is of power, without God's miraculous deliverance, to destroy our force, and so by degrees to ruin the kingdom.

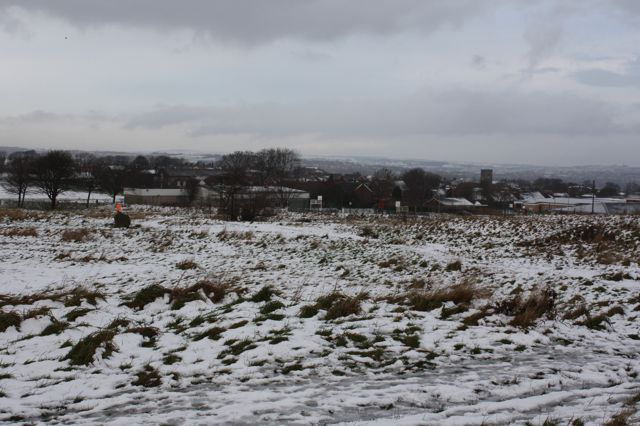
Adwalton Moor battlefield

The aftermath of the Battle of Adwalton Moor, some 3 miles (4.8 km) east of Bradford, at the end of June 1643, left the town undefended against a Royalist attack. (Note: At this time, Bradford was a town surrounded by villages - its city status was not conferred until 1897.) The two opposing armies met at Adwalton Moor by chance; both had hoped to surprise each other (the Royalists were billeted at Howley Hall, and the Parliamentarians at Bradford). Some on the Parliamentarian side considered this a trap, with Fairfax himself accusing Major General John Gifford of having delayed their departure from Bradford by four hours. Fairfax and his army, whilst initially successful, found themselves overwhelmed on their left flank (the north) and so retreated south westwards along "a lane in the field we were in which led to Halifax, which, as a happy providence, brought us off without any great loss." With the Parliamentarians scattered to Halifax, the Earl of Newcastle ordered his army to march on Bradford. However, some Parliamentarians retreated to Bradford, and when the city was besieged by Newcastle's troops, they managed to escape on horse, those on foot, could not get out. During the escape, the wife of Sir Thomas Fairfax was captured. The Earl of Newcastle returned her to Fairfax the next day. The cannon-fire from the Royalist guns and feigned attacks by the Royalists demoralised the defenders and made them waste their ammunition. A surrender was suggested by Sir Thomas Fairfax to his opponents, but both sides were distrustful of each other and so nothing came of it. Further skirmishes over the night led to the Parliamentarian side running out of lead and shot; Fairfax and his officers left the town to its fate in the early hours of 2 July 1643.

The resistance of the people of Bradford to the Royalist attacks angered the Earl of Newcastle, so much so that he was quoted as ordering his troops to

...put to the sword every man, woman or child, of every age without regard to age or distinction whatsoever...

The Earl was also said to have told his men to give the inhabitants of the town "Bradford Quarter". However, the next day, the earl rescinded this order. Whilst staying overnight at Bolling Hall, his sleep was disturbed three times by a girl clad in white who beseeched him to "pity poor Bradford". Some people have interpreted this event differently, however, the next morning the Royalist troops occupied the town largely peacefully. Cooke states that a massacre would go against Newcastle's record of how he conducted himself during previous engagements. However, he could have been buoyed by the release of 200 Royalist prisoners at Wakefield, and he had just heard that Fairfax and the Parliamentarians had abandoned Leeds.

Bradford was relieved of its Royalist forces in February and March 1644 by John Lambert, though Sir John Belasyse tried to reclaim the town on 25 March 1644; the attack failed.

== Aftermath ==
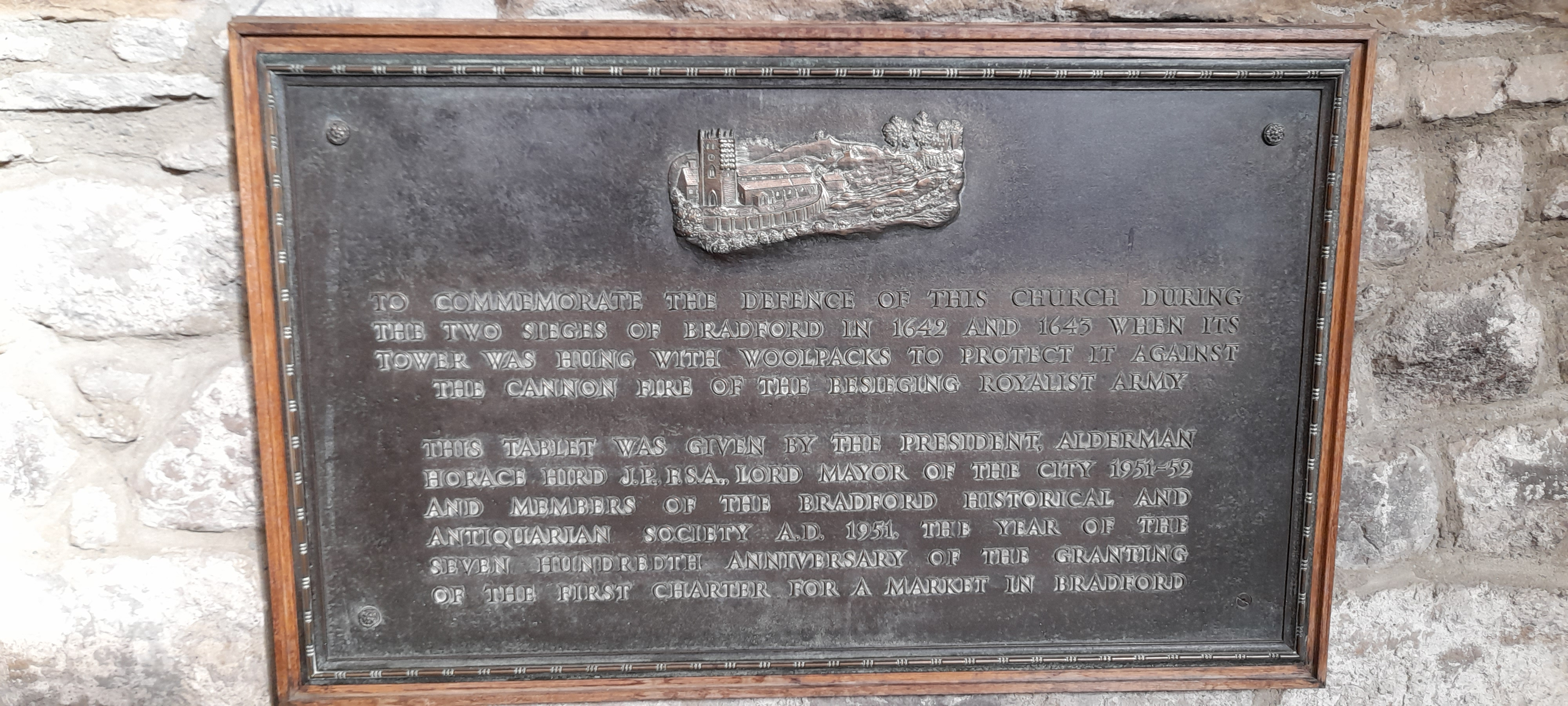
Bradford Cathedral Civil War plaque

Due to the sacking and loss of food, a pestilence affected Bradford immediately after the second siege of 1643, which is said to have taken one-hundred years to recover from. As a result of this, Bradford lost its prominence in the area, with Leeds becoming the leader in trading.

In 1951, the Bradford Historical and Antiquarian Society installed a plaque in Bradford Cathedral which reads: "To commemorate the defence of this church during the two sieges of Bradford in 1642 and 1643 when the tower was hung with woolsacks to protect it from cannon fire of the besieging Royalist Army."

== Cultural references ==
John Nicholson published a drama of the siege and the battle that preceded it in 1821 entitled "The Siege of Bradford". In the drama, a servant girl at Bowling-Hall[sic] whitens her face and utters a speech tormenting the Earl of Newcastle with a threat that he will not be afforded mercy when he is judged by God for the killing of the people of Bradford.
