= Oakwell Hall =

Manor house in Birstall, West Yorkshire, England

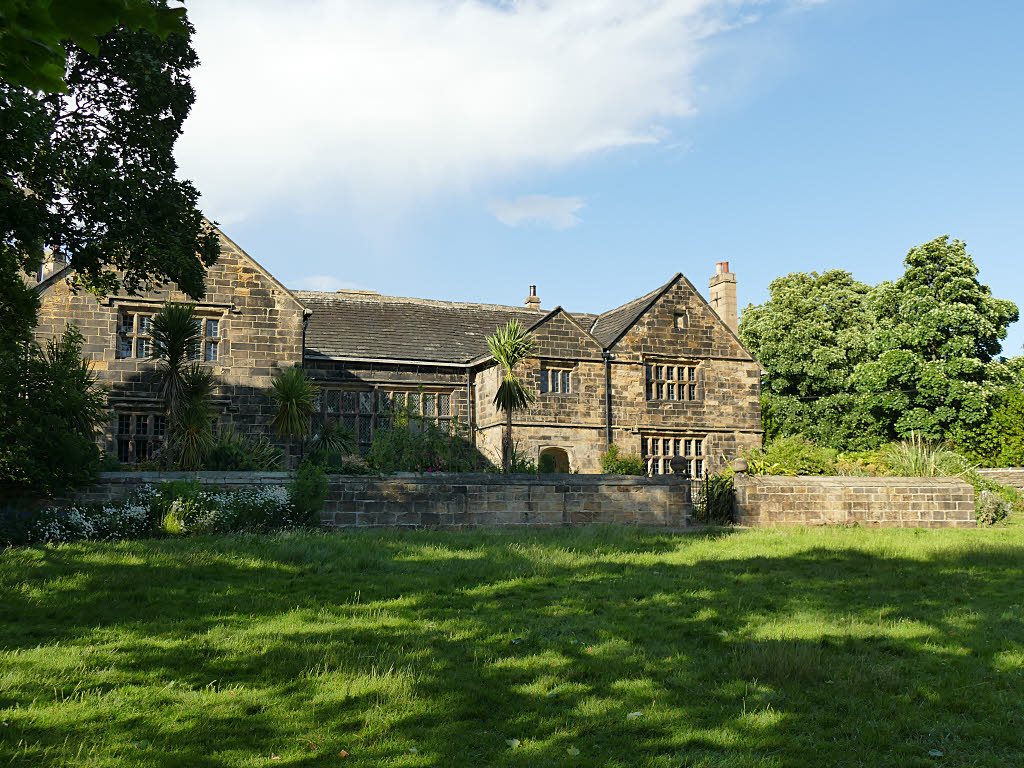
- Interactive map of the Oakwell Hall area

General information
- Type: Manor house
- Architectural style: Elizabethan
- Location: Nutter Lane, Birstall, Batley, West Yorkshire, England
- Coordinates: 53.7400°N 1.6718°W (grid reference SE2127)
- Owner: Kirklees Council

Technical details
- Grounds: 110 acres (0.45 km^{2})

Design and construction
- Main contractor: John Batte
- Designations: Grade I listed

Website
- Oakwell Hall

Oakwell Hall is an Elizabethan manor house in Birstall, West Yorkshire, England. The Grade I listed hall is set in period gardens surrounded by 110 acres (0.45 km^{2}) of country park.

The house was built for John Batte. A recarved stone dated 1583 probably indicates the date of construction. The estate had been purchased by Batte's Halifax-born father, a receiver of rents to the Savile family, who lived at Howley Hall in Batley.

Oakwell Hall was immortalised in literature as "Fieldhead" by Charlotte Brontë, in her novel Shirley.

It is used in many TV productions, most recently the ITV drama Victoria.

== History ==
John Batt built the hall after the estate had been purchased by his father, a receiver of rents for the Savile family, who lived at Howley Hall in Batley. The hall was built in gritstone to a post-medieval plan with a central hall flanked by crosswings. Its entrance is through a porch and screens passage at the lower end of the house. A recarved stone dated 1583 probably indicates the date of construction.

Oakwell Hall passed into municipal hands in 1928 and is owned and managed by Kirklees Council. The hall is supported by volunteers from the Friends of Oakwell Hall. The hall's interiors were restored to a late-17th-century condition, the time the Batt family lived here, with the aid of research into local inventories. During restoration the original painted panelling of the great parlour and the painted chamber was revealed from under layers of varnish and paint.

The BBC Television series Gunpowder (2017) used Oakwell Hall as a location.

== Interior ==
The Great Hall originally had two storeys but, in the mid-17th century, John Batt's grandson removed the ceiling and inserted a gallery and a large mullioned and transomed window. It was the main thoroughfare for the house linking the wings and hub of domestic life. It was a reception room for visitors, tenants and businessmen and large gatherings. It is sparsely furnished and uncluttered. The table is placed at one end of the room as it would have been towards the end of the 17th century, rather than in its earlier position in the centre. The size of the room is intended to impress visitors.

The Great Parlour was the most important room in the early 17th century. According to the inventory of 1611 it had the best furniture, and contained the Batt family's collection of maps. In the 1630s the Batts added a magnificent plaster ceiling and painted the oak panelling including a landscape scene above the fireplace. Most of the original panels have survived. The painting technique known as scumbling was a way of decorating to create an air of warmth and grandeur. Few examples of this decorative work survive today. In the late 17th century, dining rooms and parlours were the preferred rooms for eating and entertaining guests in private. The great parlour is furnished with pieces intended to show it as a fashionable and comfortable room of the 1690s.

In 1690, the Great Parlour Chamber was occupied by John Batt. It has a garderobe in the outer wall. The rush matting in this and other family rooms was a feature of wealthy households, and was warmer than bare floorboards or stone floors. The fireplace is a 19th-century addition, one of few interior structural changes made since the 17th century. The inclusion of a table and chairs in a bed chamber in the 17th century was not unusual. Bed chambers had a dual purpose where their occupiers thought nothing of entertaining guests with wine or cards.

The kitchen was one of the busiest rooms in the home. The mistress supervised female servants preparing food, medicines and pot-pourri, and there would be a stream of tradesmen, estate workers, errand boys and servants of visiting gentry. At meal times the servants gathered to eat from wooden platters. When the hall was built, food may have been cooked over a large fire at one end of the Great Hall but, by the time of the inventory of 1611, the kitchen occupied a separate room in the east wing. The kitchen is divided from the living quarters by the screens passage. The 17th-century fireplace, replaced in the 19th century, would have been wider and larger.

The Kitchen Chamber is where the servants slept and food was stored. It is unpanelled and has no ceiling. Its position next to the back stairs and above the kitchen made it accessible to the servants. Many local houses used their kitchen chambers for storage. In 1611 it had five arks for storing meal and grain. Today it has one great ark and a collection of food chests. Lack of a fireplace and unpanelled walls would have made it cold in winter, although warmth from the kitchen below would keep the stored food dry.

The inventory of 1611 records the household had 17 beds of different types, truckle beds for the servants and grand tester beds for members of the family. Older beds were relegated to less important rooms. The Little Parlour Chamber is furnished with older furniture and used as a second-best bedchamber. Reproduction tapestries are hung on the walls. In the 19th century, this room was transformed with the addition of the stairs and passage. The original timber studding can be seen on two walls, showing the lath and plaster structure.

The layout of the New Parlour shows typical features of a modest 17th-century dining room. Servants placed food on the side table, and served it to the family. The court cupboard housed pewter and plate and could be locked as could the small corner spice cupboard, the key kept by the mistress, as spices were valuable commodities.

A gentry household in the 17th century accommodated visitors. The New Parlour Chamber, displayed as a second-best bed chamber, may have been occupied by the nursemaid and her charges, or other members of the household. The screen at right angles to the doorway prevented draughts through the bed curtains. An adjoining dressing room or closet is used to display reproduction costumes. The warm colours of the panelling and bed curtains are echoed in the carpet on the table, a feature of wealthier 17th-century houses. Tables or beds were ideal places to display a fine carpet too valuable to walk upon.

The Painted Chamber is furnished with reproduction oak furniture to show what it looked like when new (not dark with age and polish). The painted panelling has a larger design than that the Great Parlour and is less decorative. It was discovered under layers of emulsion paint and thought to date from the 17th century. The room is displayed as the mistress's chamber; a small table by the window obtains the maximum light for sewing. The floorboards have been relaid in a 17th-century manner. In 1609, a floor was laid at a cost of five shillings and tenpence for seven days' work, as recorded in the account book. The painted panelling creates a three-dimensional effect imitating the grainy effect of wood. The wild 'squiggles' were intended to imitate walnut, a wood becoming more fashionable in the late 17th century. It was expensive so painting was used to imitate it. The paint had a linseed oil base, and feathers and combs were dragged over it to create the grained effect.

The study is a small room off the gallery above the Main Hall. The 1611 inventory of Robert Batt shows him to have more than 60 books, at a time when books were expensive and few people could read. He studied at Oxford University and became rector at Newton Tony in Wiltshire.

== Grounds ==
A Stone Ram statue, rumoured to have stood above the gates to Dewsbury Brewery, stands on the lawn in front of the hall.

=== Formal gardens ===
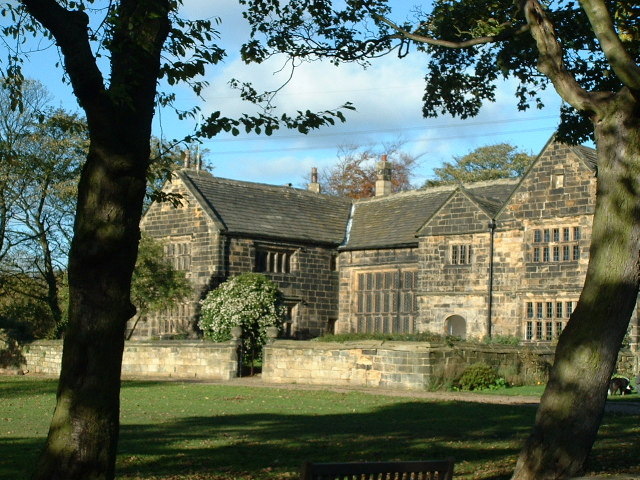
The exterior of the hall

Surrounding the hall are formal gardens including a herb garden at the side. Herbs and flowers were essential ingredients for the housewife and cook. They were distilled to produce scented oils and are the basis of herbal remedies and had an important culinary role. Although Oakwell's herb garden is small, it gives an impression of the range of herbal plants available. More than 80 varieties of herbs are found in the garden and many more planted amongst the flowers in the formal gardens behind the hall.

Restoration has been carried out to return the formal gardens to how they would have been in the 1690s using plants popular at the time. The garden contains a parterre with topiary specimens and clipped box hedging. The patterns of the box hedges were taken from furniture and plaster work in the hall and feature the lozenge design local to the area. Trellis has been made using locally sourced materials and 17th-century carpentry techniques. Even the shade of green used to colour the woodwork is typical of the period.

=== Parkland ===
Oakwell Hall Country Park is the most northerly accredited country park in England. Within the 110 acres (0.45 km^{2}) of parkland are many diverse habitats: woodland, streams, pastureland, ponds and bridleways. Nature trail marker indicate several walks around the park. Information points give details of the flora and fauna. One walk out of the park leads to the site of the Battle of Adwalton Moor and another to Red House (now closed).

Colliery Field, the pastureland in the middle of the park was the site of the spoil heaps of Gomersal Colliery, which closed in the 1970s. The nutrient-poor soil has been reseeded with meadow plants such as red clover, ox-eye daisy, self heal and yellow rattle. The nectar-rich flowers attract insects, particularly bumblebees. The field is sometimes used for historical English Civil War battle re-enactments, horse shows and country fairs.

Colliery Pond was created when the National Coal Board constructed a concrete road to facilitate tipping. The road is concealed beneath the grass and acts as a dam. Water plants include water forget-me-not, bogbean and purple loosestrife. Large numbers of creatures are attracted to the pond, such as toads, moorhens, smooth newts, swan mussels plus varieties of damselfly and dragonfly.

Nova Meadow is damp area containing moisture-loving plants including lady's smock, common tussock grass, meadowsweet, ragged robin and yellow flag iris. A pond was created in 2003 to attract wildlife and the southern part of the meadow has reverted to scrubland creating a habitat for yellowhammers and linnets. In autumn it attracts thrushes, fieldfares and redwings which feed on the hawthorn berries.

Much of Nova Wood was coppiced for pit props for Gomersal Colliery but the trees have regrown to produce multi-stemmed sessile oaks and birch. Nova Wood is carpeted by bluebells during spring and is a habitat for summer migrant birds such as chiffchaff and blackcap.

Nova Beck is one of two streams that run through Oakwell, both running north to south. Nova Beck forms the western boundary of Nova Wood and flows through areas of wildflowers. Many of the species present such as yellow archangel, wood anemone and wild garlic are good indicators of ancient woodland. Hard shield fern, red campion and herb bennet grow in abundance.

Oakwell Beck winds its course along the southern boundary of Colliery Field. Along its length are exposed coal seams and fossilized 'ripples' from ancient seas. It does not support the same diversity of plants as Nova Beck, but in spring and early summer, the wooded areas are thick with wild garlic, lesser celandine and bistort. Occasional patches of lords and ladies survive in shadier parts. Ash, alder and willow make up the majority of the tree cover and provide habitat for tawny owls.

== Ghost ==
A legend concerns the ghost of William Batt, aged 25, a bachelor whose widowed mother, Elizabeth, lived at Oakwell. An account of the story was written by Mrs Gaskell in her Life of Charlotte Brontë (1857). Her account is as follows:

"Captain Batt was believed to be far away; his family was at Oakwell; when in the dusk on winter evening, he came stalking along the lane, through the hall and up the stairs, into his own room, where he vanished. He has been killed in duel in London that very same afternoon of December 9th 1684."

The legend says that he left a bloody footprint in a bedroom. The historical facts from the archives show that Batt was at the Black Swan, in Holborn, London on 9 December where he borrowed money. Local diarist Oliver Heywood has two entries recording his death; one that he died 'in sport'; the other that he was 'slain by Mr Gream at Barne near London'. Batt was buried in Birstall on 30 December 1684.

== Brontë connection ==
In the 19th century the hall was used as a girls' school. Charlotte Brontë's closest friend Ellen Nussey (whom she first met at Roe Head school) lived in Birstall and almost certainly brought her to see the school at Oakwell since Charlotte was considering setting up a school at Haworth with her sisters. Charlotte Brontë visited the hall and was inspired to use it as the setting for the manor house, Fieldhead, in her novel Shirley.

"If Fieldhead had few other merits as a building, it might at least be termed picturesque: its irregular architecture, and the grey and mossy colouring communicated by time, gave it a just claim to this epithet. The old latticed windows, the stone porch, the walls, the roof, the chimney-stacks, were rich in crayon touches and sepia lights and shades. The trees behind were fine, bold, and spreading; the cedar on the lawn in front was grand, and the granite urns on the garden wall, the fretted arch of the gateway, were, for an artist, as the very desire of the eye." Charlotte Brontë; Shirley (1849)

Elizabeth Gaskell described the house when discussing Shirley: "From the ‘Bloody Lane’, overshadowed by trees, you come into the field in which Oakwell Hall is situated... The enclosure in front, half court, half garden; the panelled hall, with the gallery opening into the bed-chambers running round; the barbarous peach-coloured drawing-room; the bright look-out through the garden-door upon the grassy lawns and terraces behind, where the soft-hued pigeons still love to coo and strut in the sun, – are described in Shirley. The scenery of that fiction lies close around; the real events which suggested it took place in the immediate neighbourhood." Elizabeth Gaskell; The Life of Charlotte Brontë (1857)

Oakwell is a trailhead on the Brontë Way, a 43-mile (69 km) long-distance footpath that skirts Bradford to Haworth then crosses the South Pennines, continuing to Gawthorpe Hall, Padiham, Lancashire.

== Friends of Oakwell Hall ==

Founded in 1988, the Friends of Oakwell Hall and Country Park are a voluntary support group for the manor house and its surrounding 110 acres (0.45 km^{2}) of country park. Friends work with the Head Ranger and staff at Oakwell and provide assistance inside and outside the hall.

== Archaeology ==
Archaeological excavations have been carried out by WYAS with help from 'South Leeds Archaeology', a community group based in Rothwell. In May 2008 the lawn in front of the hall was excavated to reveal post holes, probably left from a farm that occupied the site and disappeared from maps between 1834 and 1844.
