= Adwalton =

Village in West Yorkshire, England

Coordinates: 53.751388°N 1.654537°W

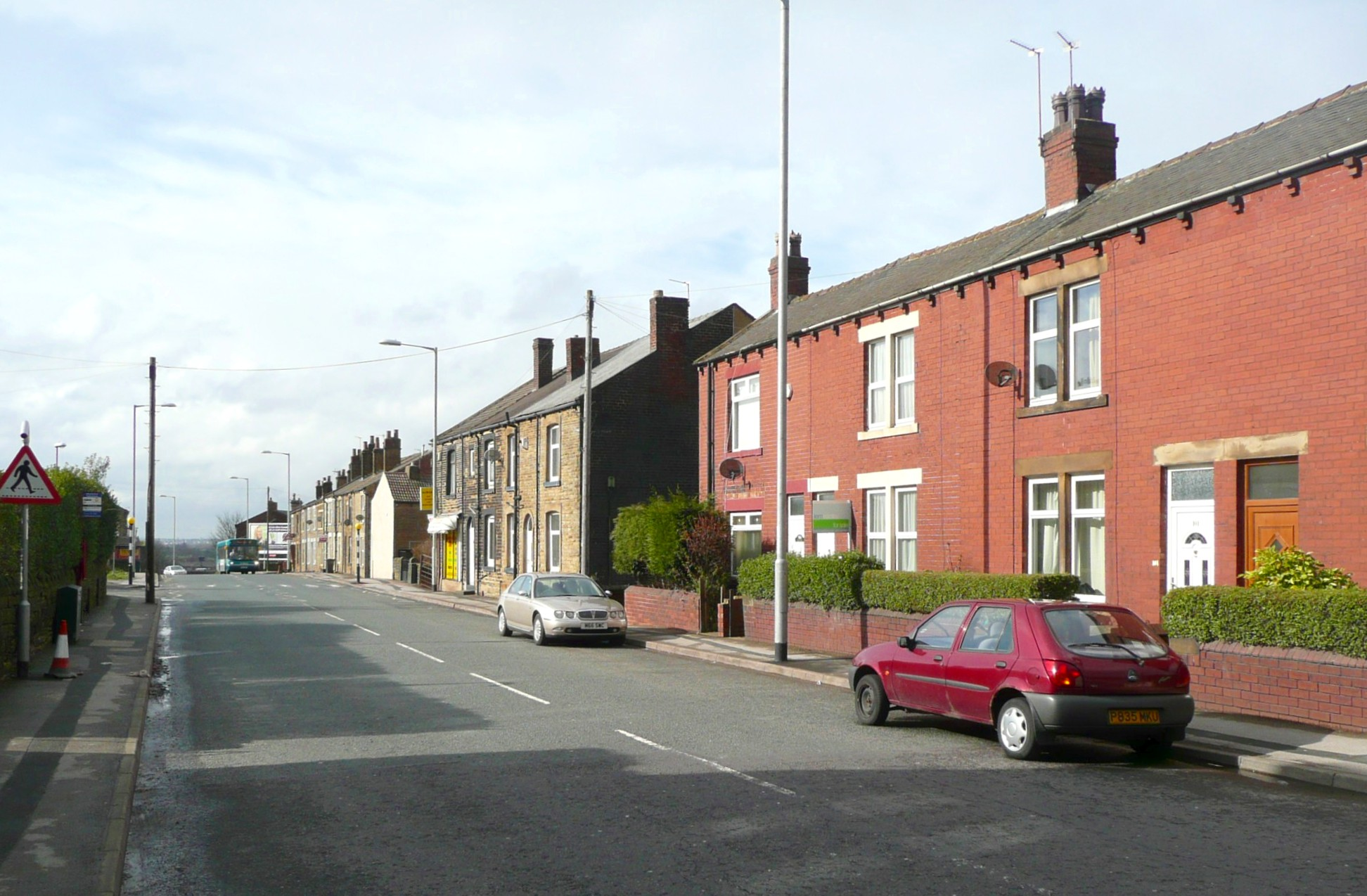
- Adwalton, looking roughly north-west along the B6135 Wakefield Road

- Location within West Yorkshire
- OS grid reference: SE2229
- Metropolitan borough: City of Leeds
- Metropolitan county: West Yorkshire
- Region: Yorkshire and the Humber
- Country: England
- Sovereign state: United Kingdom
- Post town: BRADFORD
- Postcode district: BD11
- Dialling code: 0113
- Police: West Yorkshire
- Fire: West Yorkshire
- Ambulance: Yorkshire
- UK Parliament: Morley and Outwood

Adwalton is a village in the City of Leeds metropolitan borough, West Yorkshire, England. It is 6 miles (9.7 km) south west of Leeds and is now generally regarded as part of the larger village of Drighlington. It is in the BD11 (Bradford) postcode area. The population of the village at the 2011 Census was only limited. It is included in the Morley, West Yorkshire ward of Leeds City Council, and the Morley and Outwood UK parliamentary constituency.

It is notable as the site of the Battle of Adwalton Moor in 1643; an event of the First English Civil War.

== Etymology ==
The name of the village is first attested in 1202, as Athelwaldon, and then in 1208 as Adwalton. The name derives from the Old English personal name Æthelwald and the word tūn ('farmstead, estate'). Thus the name originally meant 'Æthelwald's estate'.
