= Battle of Leeds =

1643 battle of the English Civil War

Coordinates: 53.7969°N 1.5424°W

- Part of the First English Civil War
| Date | 23 January 1643 |
| Location | Leeds, Yorkshire |
| Result | Parliamentarian victory |

Belligerents
| Royalists | Parliamentarians |

Commanders and leaders
| Sir William Savile | Sir Thomas Fairfax |

Strength
| c. 2,000 | c. 3,000 |

Casualties and losses
| 40–50 killed 460 captured 2 cannons captured | c. 20 killed |

The battle of Leeds took place during the First English Civil War on 23 January 1643, when a Parliamentarian force attacked the Royalist garrison of Leeds, Yorkshire. The attack was partly dictated by the need to maintain local support for the Parliamentarian cause; the Earl of Newcastle had recently shifted the balance of power in Yorkshire in the Royalists' favour with the addition of his 8,000-strong army, and sent one of his commanders, Sir William Savile to capture Leeds. The West Riding of Yorkshire relied on the cloth trade, and Ferdinando, Lord Fairfax sent his son, Sir Thomas Fairfax to bolster the defences of nearby Bradford, before agreeing to his request to attack Leeds.

Savile, who had command of around 2,000 men in Leeds, built a trench on the western edge of Leeds, destroyed one bridge on the approach to the town and heavily fortified another. Fairfax attacked during a heavy snowstorm, bringing an army of roughly 3,000 men to attack Leeds in three places. The battle lasted around two hours before the Parliamentarians secured the town, and captured about 500 prisoners. Fairfax lost around 20 men during the attack, while the Royalists suffered roughly double as many fatalities.

== Background ==
In January 1643, the First English Civil War had been formally ongoing for five months, since King Charles I had raised his royal standard in Nottingham and declared the Earl of Essex, and by extension Parliament, traitors. That action had been the culmination of religious, fiscal and legislative tensions going back over fifty years.

=== Yorkshire ===
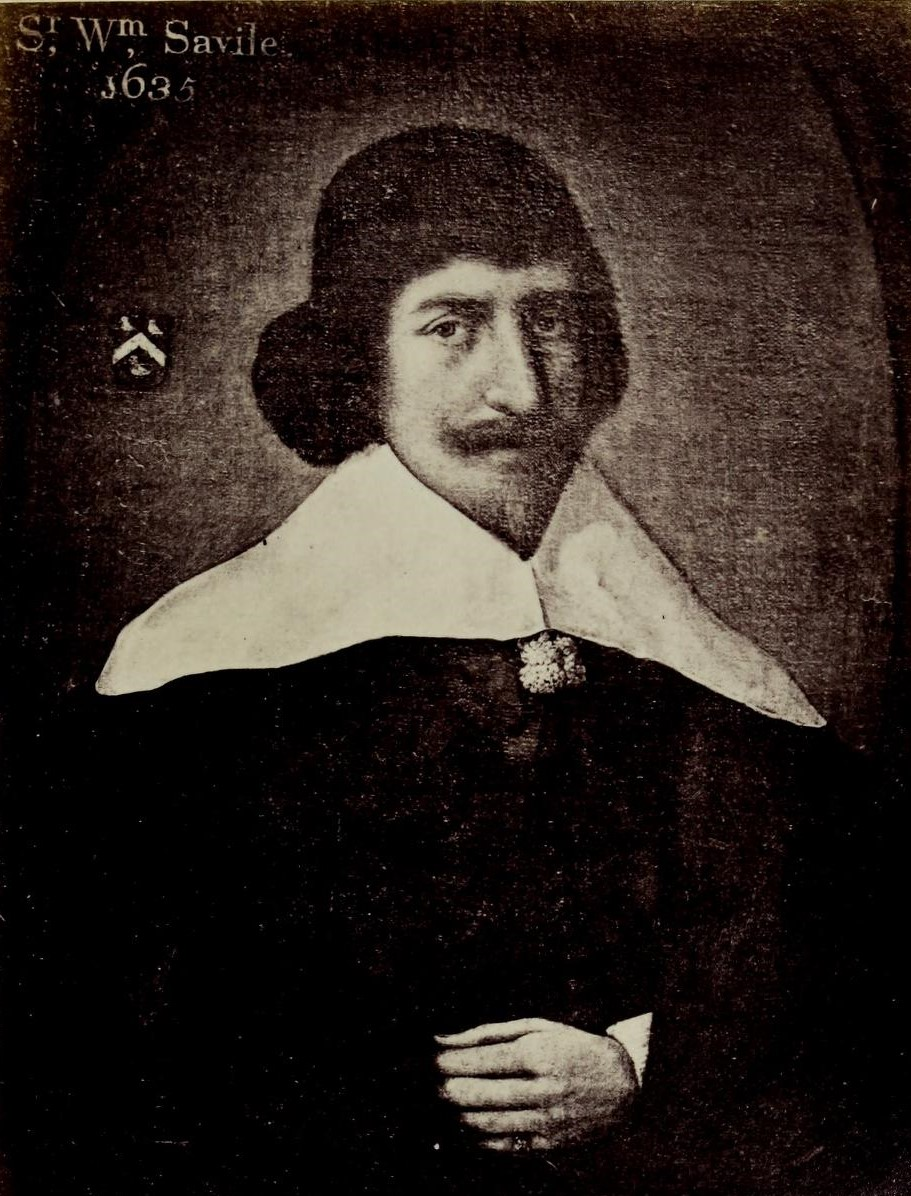
In December 1642, Sir William Savile garrisoned Leeds for the Royalists.

Upon the formal start of the civil war in August, Charles appointed the Earl of Cumberland as commander of the Royalist forces in Yorkshire. A contemporary writer, Sir Philip Warwick, said that Cumberland's "genius was not military", and combined with insufficient forces, the Royalists suffered a series of defeats across the county. Negotiations were made for the Earl of Newcastle to assist them, which resulted in Cumberland handing over command of the counties' forces. Newcastle advanced into Yorkshire with around 8,000 men, defeating the Parliamentarians at Piercebridge, and established himself in York on 3 December. Among his men was Sir William Savile, who he sent to secure the West Riding towns of Leeds, Wakefield and Bradford. Savile was a deputy lieutenant of the West Riding who had raised a regiment of 900 men from the region in 1639. With 1,500 infantry and 500 cavalry, Savile took Leeds and Wakefield without a fight, but had to split off a portion of his force to attempt to capture Bradford on 18 December, where he was repelled.

Newcastle's advance into Yorkshire had shifted the balance significantly; until that point the Parliamentarians, led by Ferdinando, Lord Fairfax, had recruited and manoeuvred their forces better than the Royalists, giving them the upper hand in the county. The introduction of an army of 8,000 Royalists left the Parliamentarians heavily outnumbered, and unable to effectively defend the clothing districts that the area relied upon. Fearing that their popular support in the area would slip away, Lord Fairfax sent his son, Sir Thomas Fairfax, to support Bradford. He arrived in the town in late December, bringing 120 dragoons and three cavalry troops.

=== Leeds ===
The small wool town of Leeds in the West Riding of Yorkshire, in what is now West Yorkshire, had both economical and tactical significance during the war. The cloth industry was critical for the area, and the finishing processes at Leeds was an essential part of that. Additionally, Leeds was located across the roads to York, Chester and Hull, controlling access to the food production in the Vale of York. At the time, Leeds was predominantly built around a single street, Briggate, which ran down to the River Aire; branching off Briggate were Kirkgate and Boar Lane. The town had a population of around 6,000.

Unlike towns such as Hull, Leeds was not walled and had minimal natural defences. Savile made preparations for the town's defence, by having a six-foot-deep (1.8 m) trench dug from St John's Church on Upper Head Row down to the river. He built breastworks on the town side of the bridge over the river, and had demi-culverins (medium-sized cannons which fired 8-to-10-pound (3.6 to 4.5 kg) shots) placed to cover Briggate. The approaches to the town along either end of both Briggate and Head Row were barricaded, with defensive positions nearby.

== Prelude ==
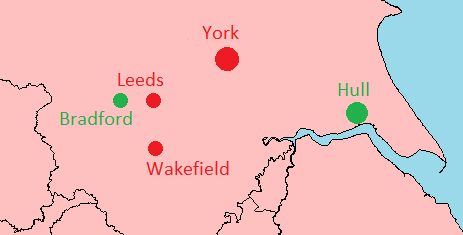
A map showing the allegiance of the major towns in the south of Yorkshire prior to the capture of Leeds. Towns marked red were held by the Royalists, and green by the Parliamentarians.

Fairfax armed as many of Bradford's residents as he could, and by the second week of January reckoned that he had a force of around 3,600 men; a significant increase in Parliamentarian numbers. He wrote to his father, warning that: "These parts grow very impatient of our delay in beating them out of Leeds and Wakefield," explaining that those towns were vital to the economics of Bradford, and that he wanted to recapture the towns. Lord Fairfax agreed, and sent reinforcements to help with the attack. The historian Andrew Hooper noted that it was a risky strategy, as he was splitting his forces despite being outnumbered by the Royalists, and was allowing popular opinion to direct the Parliamentarian strategy. Another historian, Stanley D.M. Carpenter believed that Lord Fairfax realised that he could not win large-scale pitched battles, nor hold large areas. Instead, he decided that they needed to adopt a Fabian strategy, of engaging the Royalists where they were weakest to prevent Newcastle from being able to settle.

Sir Thomas Fairfax assembled a force of over 3,000 men; composed of between 800 and 1,000 musketeers, 400 to 500 mounted troops (a combination of cavalry and dragoons) and around 2,000 clubmen. The last group was omitted by Fairfax in his own account of the battle, which the historian David Cooke suggests was due to his "low opinion of their fighting worth." The clubmen were predominantly the men that Fairfax had armed in Halifax and Bradford; inexperienced with battle and only recruited a few days previous. On Monday 23 January, Fairfax led his force to assault Leeds. Command of the force was split between three officers: Sir Henry Foulis led the mounted troops; while William Fairfax (Thomas's cousin) led the infantry, including the clubmen; a smaller force split off under the command of Captain Mildmay, taking one company of dragoons, around 30 musketeers and half of the clubmen.

Fairfax ordered Mildmay to take his force and travel along the southern bank of the Aire and gather on Hunslet Moor to both attack Leeds from the bridge at the southern end of Briggate, and to prevent any messengers being sent from the town to Royalist-held Wakefield. With the bulk of his force, Fairfax intended to cross the river near Kirkstall Abbey, around three miles (4.8 km) north-west of Leeds. The bridge had been destroyed by the Royalists to disrupt the approach, and so Fairfax's forces crossed the river at Apperley Bridge, a further four miles (6.4 km) up the river, and assembled at Woodhouse Moor, around one mile (1.6 km) from Leeds. From there Fairfax sent a trumpeter with a message to Savile, demanding him to give up the town to the Parliamentarians. Savile refused, complaining that "it was not civilly done" to approach so close to the town before sending the summons, and that they would fight to defend Leeds.

== Battle ==
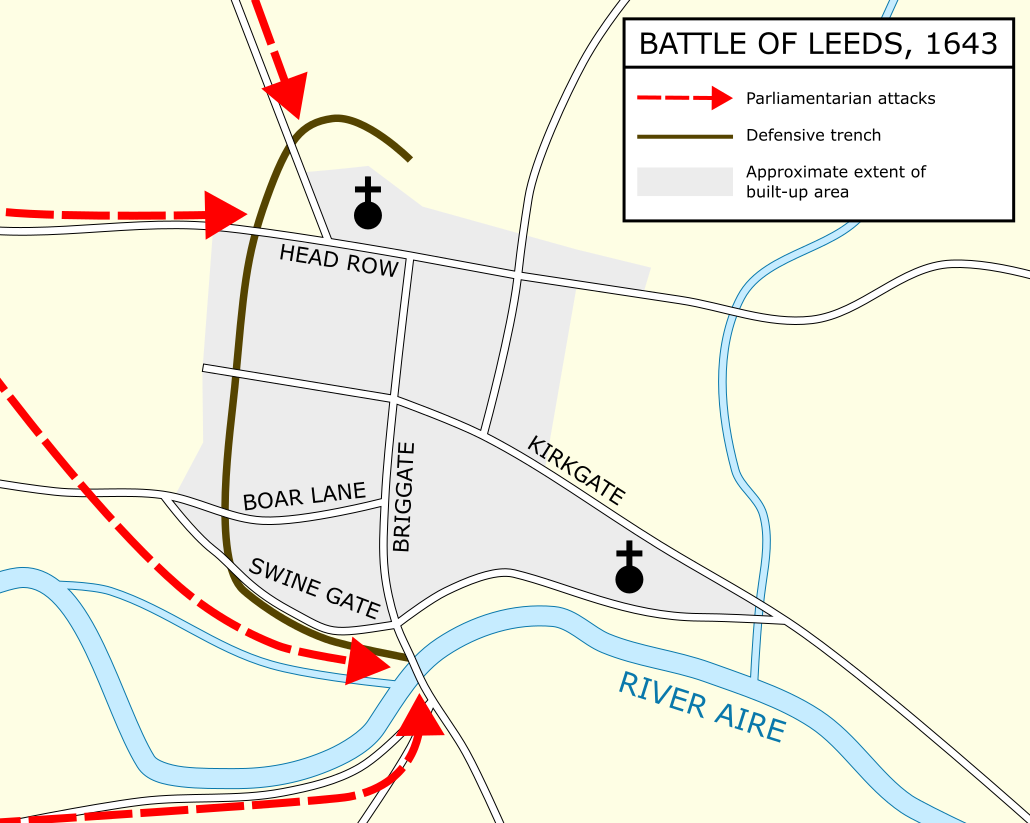
Map of Leeds, showing the Parliamentarian assault.

In a heavy snowstorm, Fairfax commenced his assault on Leeds at around 2 pm. He split five companies of infantry, along with a company of dismounted dragoons off from his main force. Under the command of Sergeant-Major Forbes, they travelled south along the trench towards the river and attacked near the bridge, becoming engaged in a musket fight with the defenders. Fairfax sent his cousin and Sir Thomas Norcliffe with a few companies of musketeers to assault the town from the north, near the church, while he himself attacked the western end of Head Row. Mildmay's force approached the river and forced the Royalists from the southern end of the bridge; as a result, Savile ordered one of the cannons to be moved down Briggate to bombard Mildmay's men. A group of Forbes' dragoons managed to focus so much fire on one of the defensive sconces that the Royalists abandoned it, and Forbes led some of his men into the fortification. Soon after the other sconce was also abandoned, and Forbes and Mildmay were able to join their forces together.

This combined force fought their way northwards along Briggate, driving men out of each house as they progressed. Schofield, a minister from a chapel near Halifax serving with the Parliamentarians, led twelve musketeers up the street towards the second cannon, succeeding in killing the crew and capturing the gun. Both Thomas and William Fairfax's assaults had also succeeded in breaking through the barricades, and by around 4 pm all three forces joined together at the Market Place at the end of Briggate. Savile, along with one of his captains and the town's vicar fled the town, swimming the river Aire on their horses in an attempt to escape; Savile and the vicar made it, but Captain Beaumont drowned. Fairfax captured 460 Royalist soldiers as prisoners, 14 barrels of gunpowder, two cannons, along with weapons and ammunition. After they had sworn not to fight against Parliament again, the prisoners were released. The Royalists suffered between 40 and 50 fatalities, while the Parliamentarians lost around half that number.

== Aftermath ==
Survivors from the Leeds garrison arrived at Wakefield at around 6 pm, bringing news of the capture of Leeds, which led to Wakefield's garrison withdrawing from the town overnight and retreating to join Newcastle at Pontefract. In turn, Newcastle decided to withdraw his forces back to York. Wakefield was garrisoned by Parliamentarians from Almondsbury on 24 January. The storming of Leeds was seized upon by Parliament who, as was typical during the civil war, published propaganda leaflets celebrating the victory of the "Bradford men, with their Clubs and Forks".

Fortunes shifted in Yorkshire again the following month; the King's wife, Henrietta Maria (formally known as Queen Mary), returned from continental Europe with additional troops, weapons, ammunition and money which enabled Newcastle to once again go on the attack. He forced Lord Fairfax to withdraw from Tadcaster to Leeds, while George Goring defeated Thomas Fairfax at the Battle of Seacroft Moor, and took around 800 of his men prisoner. Leeds remained in Parliamentarian hands until their loss at the Battle of Adwalton Moor, after which most of Yorkshire passed into Royalist control.

Thomas Fairfax won a decisive victory at Marston Moor in 1644, by the end of which most of the north of England had been captured by Parliamentarian forces. The following year Fairfax was appointed as the commander-in-chief of parliament's forces, and established the so-called "New Model Army". The army's victories, particularly at Naseby and Langport, gained parliament control of most of the rest of England.
