= Battle of Adwalton Moor =

Battle that took place in 1643 during the First English Civil War

Coordinates: 53.751°N 1.664°W

- Part of the First English Civil War
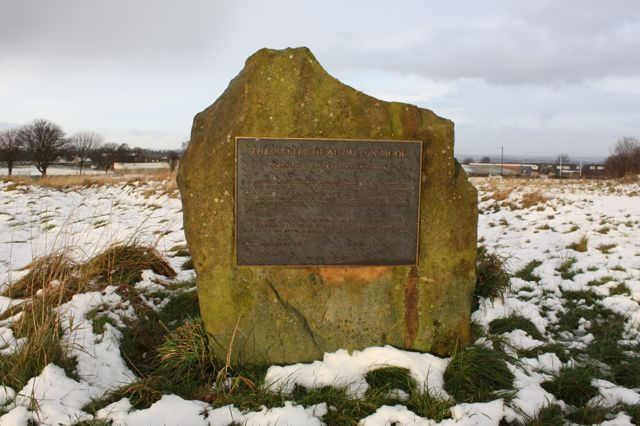
- Battle Plaque at Adwalton Moor
Date	30 June 1643; 383 years ago
Location	Adwalton, Yorkshire
Result	Royalist Victory

Belligerents
Royalists	Parliamentarians

Commanders and leaders
Earl of Newcastle	Lord Fairfax; Sir Thomas Fairfax; Major General Gifford

Strength
4,000 foot soldiers 3,000 horse	6,000 foot soldiers 1,500 horse Local countrymen

Casualties and losses
200 killed 300 wounded	500 killed 1,500 captured

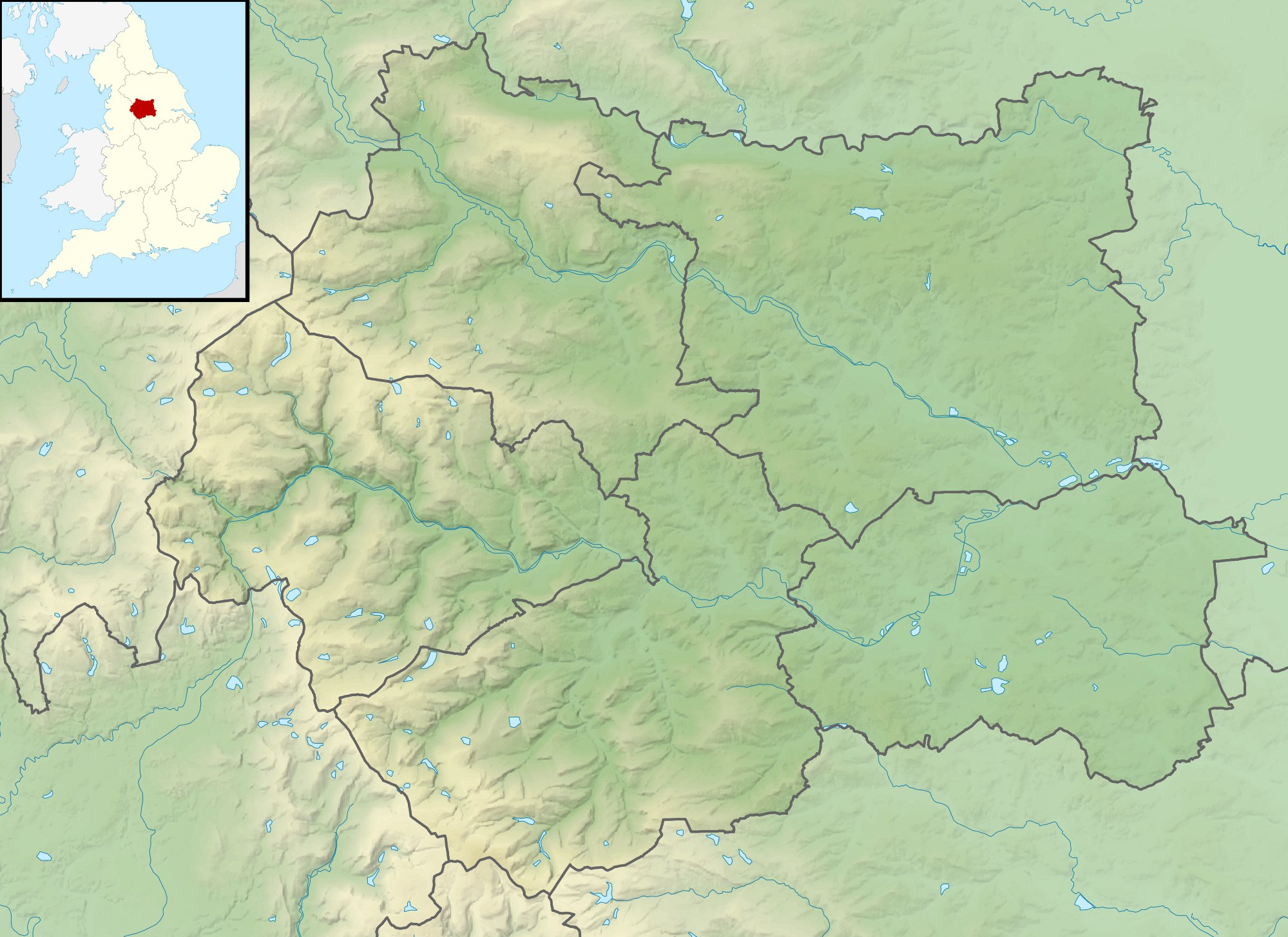
West Yorkshire and Adwalton

The Battle of Adwalton Moor occurred on 30 June 1643 at Adwalton, West Yorkshire, during the First English Civil War. In the battle, the Royalists loyal to King Charles led by the Earl of Newcastle soundly defeated the Parliamentarians commanded by Lord Fairfax.

== Background ==
During the first half of 1643, the Royalists led by the Earl of Newcastle and the Parliamentarian Army of the North under overall command by Lord Fairfax fought for control of Yorkshire and clashed several times including battles at Leeds, Seacroft Moor, and Wakefield.

On 22 June, Newcastle and the Royalists captured Howley Hall, the fortified mansion of Parliamentary supporter Lord Savile, in Batley. Newcastle then advanced north with his army of 7,000 including an artillery train with two demi-cannons. His intent was to travel seven and a half miles (12 kilometres) to the northwest to attack the Parliamentarian garrison of Bradford. If the Royalists were successful in the campaign they would take control of West Yorkshire and its cloth manufacturing towns.

When Lord Fairfax, the Parliamentary commander, was informed that the Royalist army was marching in the direction of Bradford, he made the decision to assemble his army of 7,500 men, leave the unfortified city of Bradford, and confront the Royalists in the open country. On 30 June, the two armies met on the Old Roman Road at Adwalton. In their respective histories of the battle, each side claimed that the other side was drawn up and positioned when they arrived. As so, it seems that neither side chose the location leading to an encounter battle which occurred where the two armies by chance happened to meet.

== Battle ==
Lord Fairfax and the Parliamentarians first encountered Royalist skirmishers at Wisket Hill. After driving the skirmishers back, the Parliamentarians moved to positions in enclosed fields and prepared to meet the Royalist army. Lord Fairfax commanded the centre formation as commander in chief. Sir Thomas Fairfax, Lord Fairfax's son, commanded the right wing and Major General Gifford commanded the left wing. At the outset of the battle, the Parliamentarians used their protected positions and numerical superiority of infantry to push the Royalists back. As the Parliamentarians continued to advance, they came to the edge of the open moor and forced the Royalists to retreat back to the position of their artillery battery.

After defending themselves for a while against cavalry attacks, the Parliamentarians moved into the open field and began to charge the Royalists, aiming to overrun their line and end the battle. In this charge the Parliamentarians were nearly successful. The Royalists seemed on the verge of conceding the battle when a contingent of Royalist pikemen drove back the Parliamentarian's left wing. The Royalist cavalry then swung around to the north and attacked the Parliamentarians’ left flank. Gifford and his troopers collapsed and gave up the fight, retreating in a disorderly manner. The Royalist counter-attack continued and Sir Thomas Fairfax on the right wing received his orders to retreat. Fairfax immediately retreated to the south as he discovered that the Royalists had cut the Parliamentarian right wing off from the main body of the Parliamentarian army.

The battle was over. Broken and unorganized, the units of the Parliamentarian army returned to Bradford. It is estimated that 500 Parliamentarians were killed and 1,500 were captured as they tried to get back to Bradford. Royalist losses were estimated to be 200 killed and 300 wounded.

== Aftermath ==
With the Parliamentarians on the run, Newcastle advanced immediately. Overnight on 30 June, Newcastle brought his artillery to Bradford and on the morning of 1 July he began bombardment of the Parliamentarian garrison. The Parliamentarians attempted to break out, but were unsuccessful. Ultimately, the commanders left the town in small contingents of cavalry while the remainder of the army surrendered. Within a short period, the Parliamentarians surrendered Leeds and withdrew to Hull.

The battle consolidated Royalist control of Yorkshire and has been deemed of low or medium term significance. However, historians have acknowledged that the impact of the battle, left the Parliamentarians with only Hull as a northern stronghold forcing them into a religious and political alliance with Scotland. This in turn, led to a Parliamentary victory at the Battle of Marston Moor a year later in 1644. Historic England labelled the battle as second only in importance to Marston Moor.

== Battle site details ==
The site of the battle is high ground in Adwalton (now commonly considered to be part of Drighlington, Leeds) near the border with Bradford, which is now in an area of rural-urban fringe, (map reference SE2228). Parts of the site are protected as "green belt" or other types of open space with the A650 road cutting right through the battlefield. It is the only battlefield recognised by Bradford Metropolitan District Council as falling within its boundaries but it actually lies within the Leeds City Council boundary. There are plaques interpreting the battlefield for visitors.

== Museum displays ==
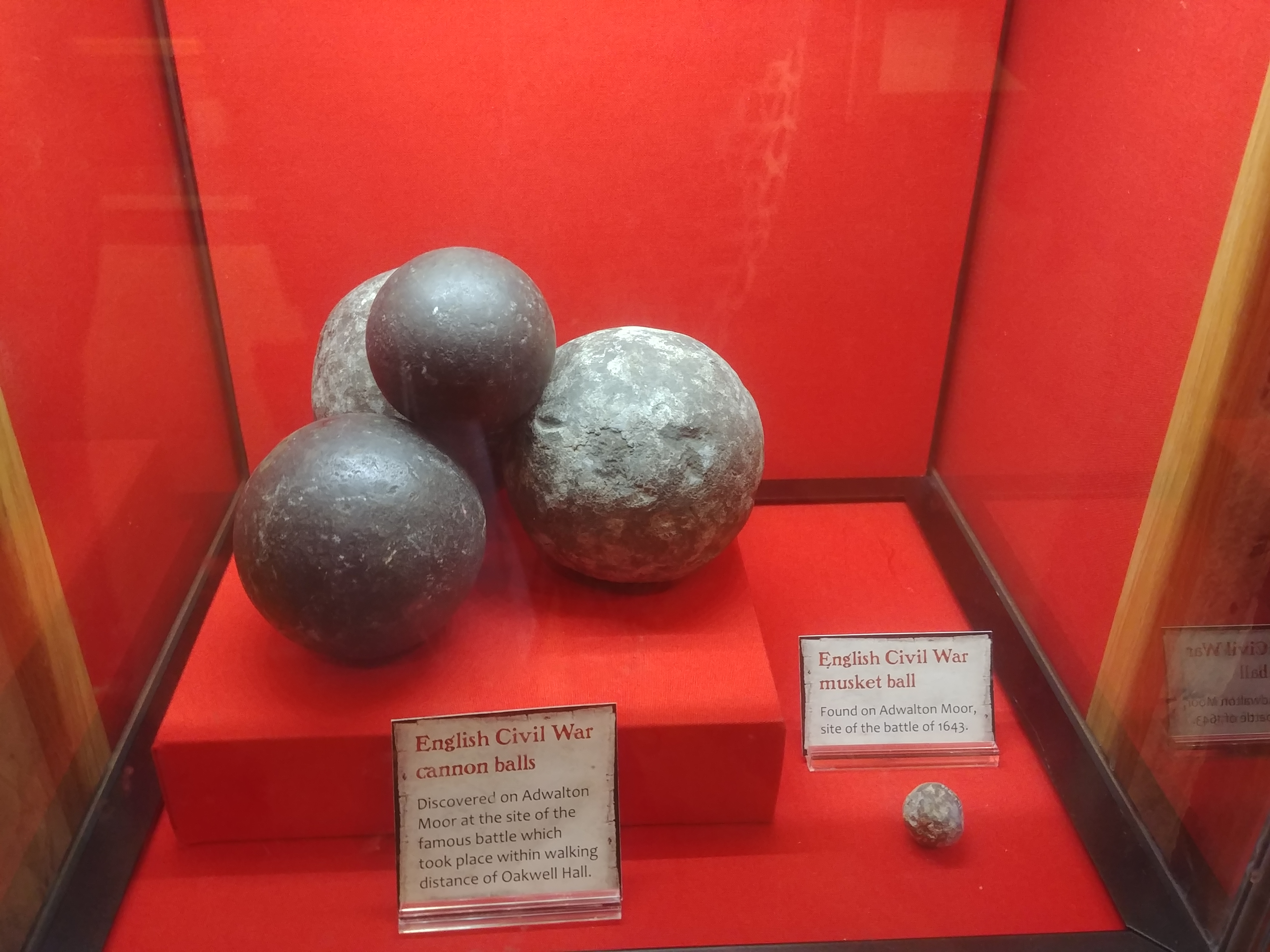
Cannon and musket balls found at Adwalton Moor on display at Oakwell Hall

There is a display dedicated to the battle at Bolling Hall, Bradford, a museum which lies a few miles from the site and was itself a Royalist base. Oakwell Hall is another museum which throws light on the civil war in Yorkshire: although the hall is situated within walking distance from the battlefield, it falls outside the boundaries of Bradford and within those of Kirklees.

== General references ==
- Crossby, Owen (3 June 2003), Adwalton Moor, Self published, archived from the original on 29 October 2013
- Fletcher, Craig; Jones, Christopher (2004), Battle of Adwalton Moor 30 June 1643, Battlefields Trust
- Gaunt, P. (1987), The Cromwellian Gazetteer : An Illustrated Guide to Britain in the Civil War & Commonwealth, A. Sutton, p. 168, ISBN 9780862992910
- Rickard, J. (24 August 2000), Adwalton Moor, battle of, 30 June 1643, Military History Encyclopedia on the Web
