= Listed buildings in Drighlington =

Drighlington is a civil parish in the metropolitan borough of the City of Leeds, West Yorkshire, England. It contains twelve listed buildings that are recorded in the National Heritage List for England. Of these, one is listed at Grade I, the highest of the three grades, and the others are at Grade II, the lowest grade. The parish contains the village of Drighlington and the surrounding countryside. Most of the listed buildings are houses, and the others include farm buildings, a restaurant and associated former stable block, a church, a former school, and a milestone.

== Key ==
Grade	Criteria
I	Buildings of exceptional interest, sometimes considered to be internationally important
II	Buildings of national importance and special interest

== Buildings ==
Name and location	Photograph	Date	Notes	Grade
Lumb Hall Barn; 53.76009°N 1.65637°W	—	Late 16th or early 17th century	The barn is timber framed, it was later encased in stone, and it has a stone slate roof. There are four bays and a single aisle. The barn contains a tall cart entry with composite jambs and a wooden lintel, a doorway with tie-stone jambs and a chamfered lintel, and a blocked chamfered slit vent. An external flight of nine stone steps leads up to a doorway with interrupted jambs, and there is a mullioned window to the left.	II
Lumb House; 53.75957°N 1.65766°W	—	Early 17th century	The house, which has been altered, is in gritstone with a string course, gutter brackets and red tile roofs. There are two storeys, a two-bay range, and a projecting cross-wing on the right. The doorway has a moulded surround, composite jambs, and a Tudor arch. The windows have been altered, and some have retained their mullions.	II
2 Old Lane; 53.75922°N 1.65301°W		Early to mid 17th century	A stone house, mainly rendered, with quoins and a stone slate roof. There are two storeys and a single-storey outshut at the rear. On the front is a doorway with composite jambs, a chamfered lintel with a Tudor arch, and a hood mould, and at the rear is a doorway with a plain surround. Most of the windows have been altered.	II
42 Old Lane; 53.76188°N 1.64869°W	—	Early to mid 17th century	A stone house, rendered and pebbledashed at the rear, with a stone slate roof. There are two storeys and a single-storey outshut at the rear, three bays, and a two-bay barn to the right. Entrance is through a gabled porch at the rear, and in the left return is a blocked doorway with tie-stone jambs. Some windows are mullioned, others have been replaced, including two bow windows.	II
Lumb Hall; 53.76012°N 1.65702°W		c. 1640	The house is in gritstone on a plinth, with a parapet and a central finial, and a stone slate roof with moulded coped gables, kneelers and finials. There are two storeys, and on the front are three gables and a projecting two-storey porch. The porch contains a semicircular-arched doorway with a moulded surround, imposts, and a dropped carved keystone. Above it is a hood mould enclosing a blank tablet, and a wheel window with eight trefoil-headed lights and a central rose window. The windows are mullioned and transomed with six and eight lights. At the rear are three gables, the middle one slightly recessed.	I
Stable and cartshed opposite Lumb Hall Barn; 53.76000°N 1.65664°W	—	Early 18th century	The stable and attached cart shed are in stone and have stone slate roofs with a coped gable. The stable has two storeys and one bay. Its front is gabled, and it contains a doorway, and a flight of external steps leading up to a doorway, with a window to the left, and a lunette above. To the right is an open three-bay cart shed, its roof carried on two circular stone columns with square bases.	II
The Kings Restaurant and stable block 53.75671°N 1.66094°W	—	Mid 18th century (probable)	A house, later a restaurant, with a former stable block attached to the rear. It is in sandstone with quoins, curved gutter brackets, and a stone slate roof with coped gables and kneelers. There are two storeys and attics, a double-depth plan, a front of three bays, and a rear wing. The central doorway has a moulded surround, composite jambs, and a lintel with a segmental arch and a dropped keystone, and above it is a decorated panel and a blind oeil-de-boeuf window. In the rear wing is a doorway with monolithic jambs. The house is joined to the former stable block by a single-storey link. The block has a hipped roof, and contains a former taking-in door.	II
Longlands; 53.75780°N 1.66031°W	—	c. 1800	A stone house, painted on the front, with rusticated quoins, moulded gutter brackets, and a stone slate roof with coped gables. There are two storeys, and a symmetrical front of three bays. The central doorway has raised monolithic jambs, above it is a single-light window, and in the outer bays are two-light mullioned windows.	II
Milestone; 53.76312°N 1.64910°W		Early to mid 19th century	The milestone is on the southeast of Whitehall Road (A58 road). It is in stone overlaid with cast iron, and has a triangular section and an arched top. On the top is "LEEDS & WHITEHALL ROAD" and "DRIGHLINGTON", and on the faces are the distances to Halifax, and Leeds.	II
Wyre Hall; 53.75180°N 1.64803°W	—	Mid 19th century	A house, later divided into two, in stone on a plinth, with a sill band, a moulded eaves cornice and blocking course, and a hipped roof of blue Welsh slate. There are two storeys, and a symmetrical front of five bays, the outer bays projecting forward. The former central doorway has been converted into a window, and the flanking windows into doorways with fanlights.	II
Drighlington Primary School; 53.75715°N 1.66020°W		1874–75	The school was designed by Lockwood and Mawson. It is in sandstone, with a string course, a lintel band, a dentilled eaves cornice, and slate roofs. There is one storey, a front of 13 bays, the outer three bays projecting with gables containing roundels, and three projecting wings at the rear. The middle bay projects as a two-stage clock tower. The lower stage is gabled and in the tympanum is lettering and a date. The upper stage has carved consoles at the base, square Doric columns at the corners, a clock face on the front with decoration below, and paired arched windows on the sides with mullions and keystones. At the top is a pyramidal roof with a weathervane and wrought iron scrollwork. The windows are sashes.	II
St Paul's Church; 53.75849°N 1.66053°W		1878–80	The church was designed by W. Swinden Barber mainly in Perpendicular style, and the interior was remodelled in about 1928 by Sir Charles Nicholson. It is built in stone with a roof of Welsh blue slate, and consists of a nave with a clerestory, north and south aisles, a south porch, a chancel, and a west tower. The tower has three stages, a five-light west window, four-light bell openings, a clock face, and an embattled parapet. At the east end are buttresses, a seven-light window with a hood mould, and a coped gable with a cross finial.	II
