= Bolling Hall, Bradford =

Grade I listed historic house museum in West Yorkshire, England

Bolling Hall
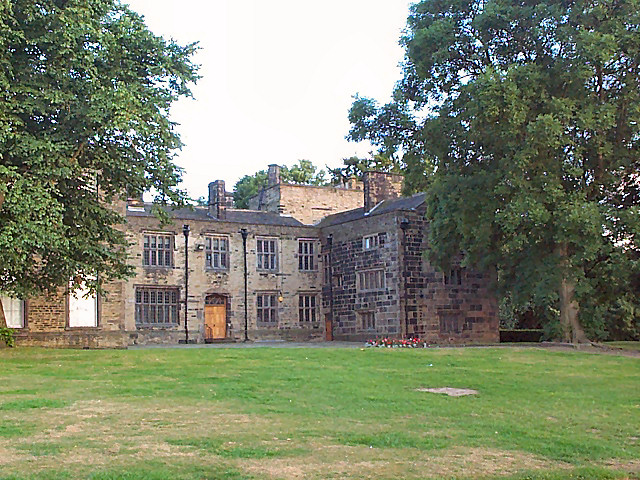
- The original front
- Interactive map of the Bolling Hall area

General information
- Location: Bowling Hall Road, Bradford, West Yorkshire, England
- Coordinates: 53°46′44″N 1°44′19″W (grid reference SE1731)
- Owner: City of Bradford Metropolitan District Council

Design and construction
- Designations: Grade I listed

Website
- www.bradfordmuseums.org/bollinghall/

Bolling Hall is one of the oldest buildings in Bradford, West Yorkshire, England. It is currently used as a museum and education centre. The building is about a mile from the centre of Bradford in East Bowling. Its surroundings are suburban in character.

Before the Industrial Revolution, Bradford was a small town and difficult to defend as it lay in a basin. However, Bolling Hall occupies a commanding position on a hillside. The earliest part of this building, dating from the 14th century, has been interpreted as a peel tower, although Bradford is somewhat outside the typical geographical area for these defensive structures.

The Manor of Bolling (Bollinc) was first mentioned in the Domesday Book and was at that time in the possession of a man named Sindi. The manor then came under the control of Ilbert de Lacy. By 1316 the manor was owned by William Bolling, and Bollings owned the estate until the late 15th century when control went to the Tempests who held the estate until 1649. The estate changed hands several times thereafter until eventually it was let to several tenants until being presented to Bradford Corporation in 1912. It was opened as a museum three years later.

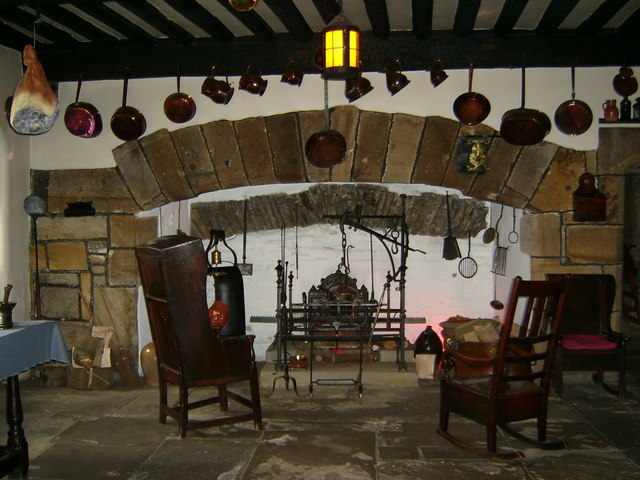
The kitchen of Bolling Hall

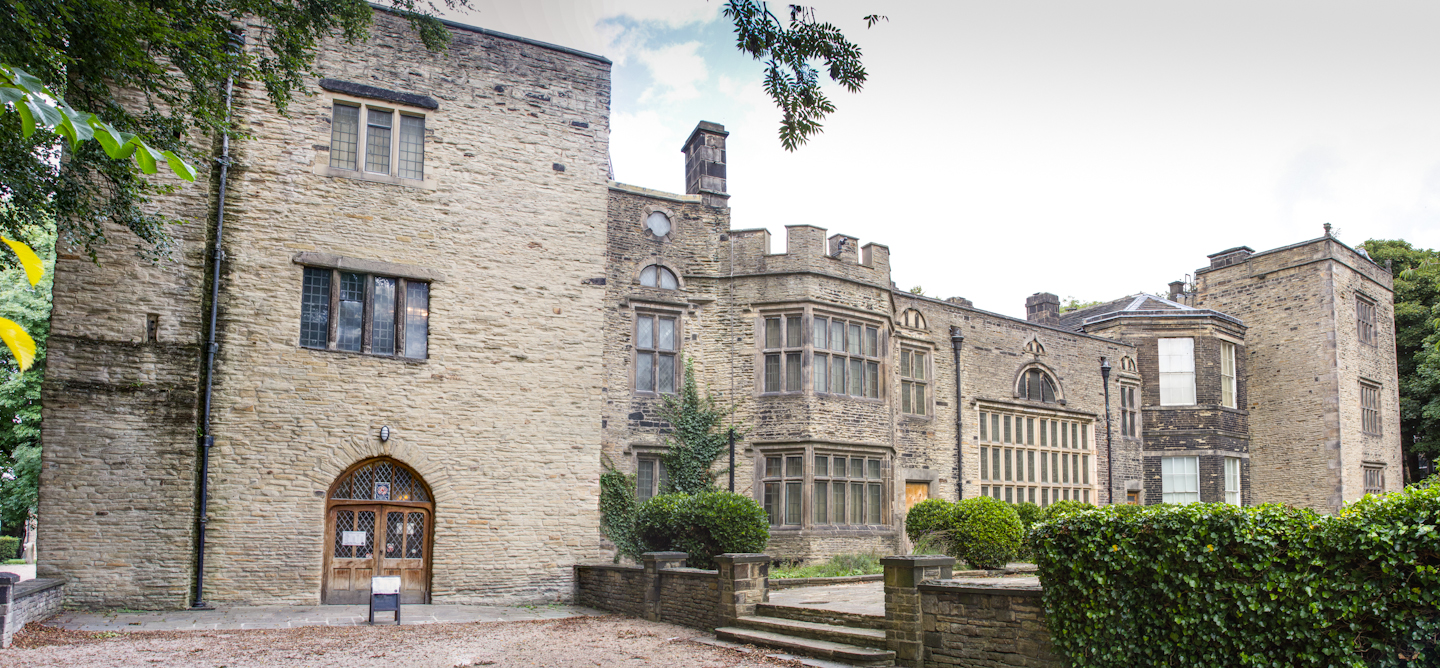
Bolling Hall

During the second siege of Bradford in 1643, during the English Civil War, the house was a Royalist base. On this occasion the Royalists took the town, which had strong Parliamentarian sympathies, and it was thought that the victors would put the inhabitants to the sword. There is usually material on display relating to the English Civil War including a death mask of Oliver Cromwell. In the 18th century, parts of the house were modernised by the architect John Carr, following a fire. The Hall was designated as a Grade I listed building in 1952.

The Bolling chapel at Bradford parish church, now Bradford Cathedral, was founded by the owners of Bolling Hall and was restored by the Tempest family in the 17th century but did not survive the 20th-century rebuilding of the chancel.

== See also ==
- Bradford District Museums & Galleries
- Grade I listed buildings in City of Bradford
- Listed buildings in Bradford (Bowling and Barkerend Ward)
- Battle of Adwalton Moor
