= Drighlington =

Village and civil parish in West Yorkshire, England

Coordinates: 53.756767°N 1.661639°W

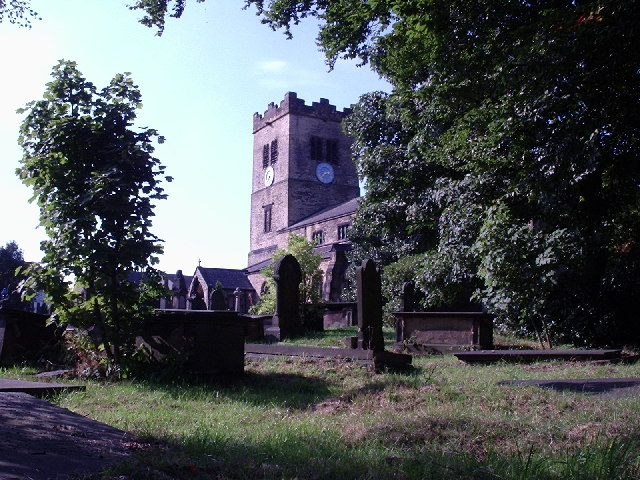
- St Paul's Church

- Location within West Yorkshire
- Population: 5,528 (2011 census)
- OS grid reference: SE2229
- Metropolitan borough: City of Leeds
- Metropolitan county: West Yorkshire
- Region: Yorkshire and the Humber
- Country: England
- Sovereign state: United Kingdom
- Post town: BRADFORD
- Postcode district: BD11
- Dialling code: 0113
- Police: West Yorkshire
- Fire: West Yorkshire
- Ambulance: Yorkshire
- UK Parliament: Morley and Outwood

Drighlington /ˈdrɪɡlɪŋtən/ is a village and civil parish in the City of Leeds metropolitan district, West Yorkshire, England. Historically part of the West Riding of Yorkshire, the village lies 5 miles (9 km) south-west of Leeds and 4 miles (6 km) south-east of Bradford. The name of the village is often shortened to Drig. The population of the civil parish as of the 2011 census was 5,528.

The village sits in the Morley North ward of Leeds City Council and was previously a part of the Morley and Outwood parliamentary constituency.

== Etymology ==
The earliest mention of Drighlington is to be found in the Domesday Book of 1086, in the forms Dreslintone and Dreslingtone, followed by an attestation in 1202 in the form Drichtlington and subsequent spellings along these lines. The name comes from Old English. The first element is a personal name, whose original form is no longer clear but was probably Dryhtel, Dryhtla, or Dryhtwulf. The second element is the suffix -ingas, denoting a group of people. Thus the Dryhtlingas were a group descended from or otherwise associated with someone called Dryhtel (or the like). This group name was then compounded with the Old English word tūn ('farmstead, estate'). Thus the name once meant something like 'the settlement of the descendants of Dryhtla'.

== History ==
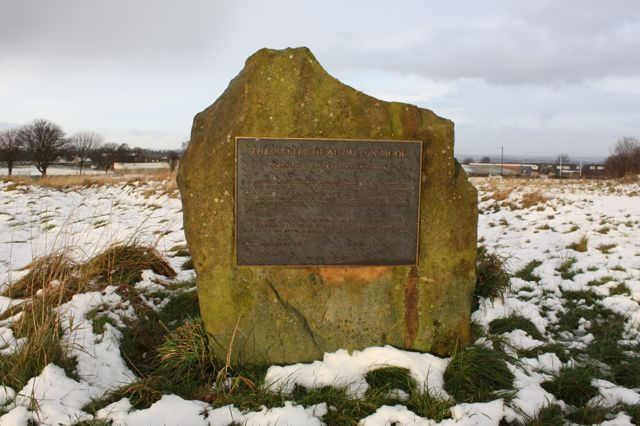
Battle plaque at Adwalton Moor

The Roman road from York to Chester ran through the village and its mark may be seen in the more or less straight run from Birkenshaw to Drighlington traffic lights.

In 1576 Queen Elizabeth I granted Letters of Patent to one James Brooke allowing him to hold a market every second Thursday and two horse and cattle fairs annually. These fairs took place at the White Hart public house (now demolished).

The village is also the site of the Battle of Adwalton Moor fought on 30 June 1643 in the First English Civil War between the armies of King Charles I and the Parliamentarians. The Royalist army under the Earl of Newcastle defeated the Parliamentarians under the command of Lord Ferdinando Fairfax and his son Sir Thomas. There are four commemorative stones with plaques depicting the battle at strategic points around the common and there is an information board on the wall of the community library. A large house stood where Plasticisers Engineering now stands. Apparently used by Royalist soldiers during the Civil War, it was demolished in the early 1960s. The stone blocks were used around Woodlea Farm, Roker Lane, Pudsey to build boundary walls.

James Margetson, a native of Drighlington, built and endowed the Drighlington Free Grammar School and endowed it (1678). It was replaced in 1875 by the Drighlington Board School.

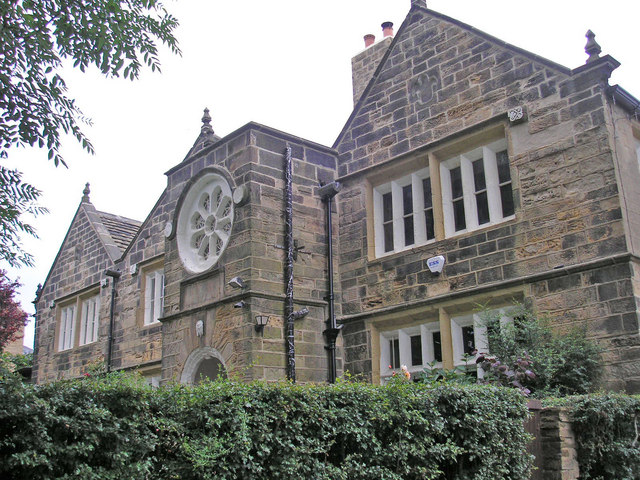
Lumb Hall, built for the Brookes family in 1640 and Grade I listed

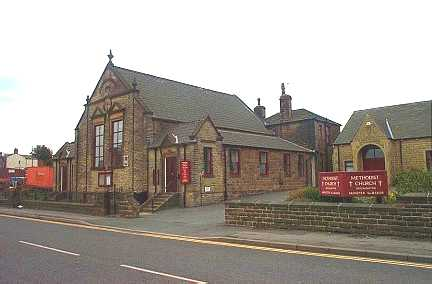
Methodist church, 2000

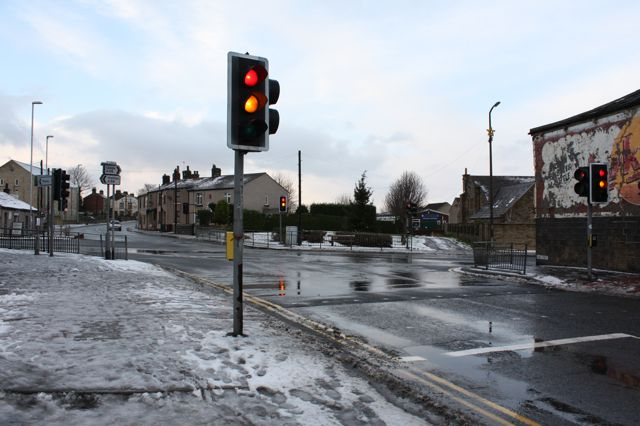
Drighlington crossroads, 2008

== Governance ==
Since local government changes in 1974, Drighlington has been in the City of Leeds metropolitan borough, in the metropolitan county of West Yorkshire. The village once formed part of the former Municipal Borough of Morley, and is still classed as part of Morley in the census. However, it is technically separate and is not governed by Morley Town Council. Since 2004, the village has had a parish council.

The metropolitan district includes other towns and villages with their own clear identity, such as Morley and Otley, as well as the city of Leeds. Drighlington is in the Morley North ward, which elects three councillors to Leeds City Council. Until the 2010 general election Drighlington was in the Morley and Rothwell parliamentary constituency, when it was transferred to the newly created constituency of Morley and Outwood. Drighlington has a Bradford postcode of "BD11" and the Royal Mail official address is "Drighlington, Bradford", while the village telephone numbers are "0113", the Leeds prefix.

The ecclesiastical parish of Drighlington was created in 1817. Drighlington was an urban district 1894-1937 and was part of Morley Municipal borough 1937–1974. Drighlington was part of the Bradford Registration district from 1837 to 1891 and North Bierley Registration district from 1892 to 1937.

== Geography ==
The village is at the junction of the A58 Leeds-Halifax road and the B6135 Tong to Gildersome Street road which used to be part of the A650 Bradford to Wakefield road. This junction is known as the Drighlington Crossroads. The A650 now bypasses Drighlington to the west of the village following part of the structure of what was the Bradford to Wakefield and London Great Northern Railway line.

== Culture and community ==
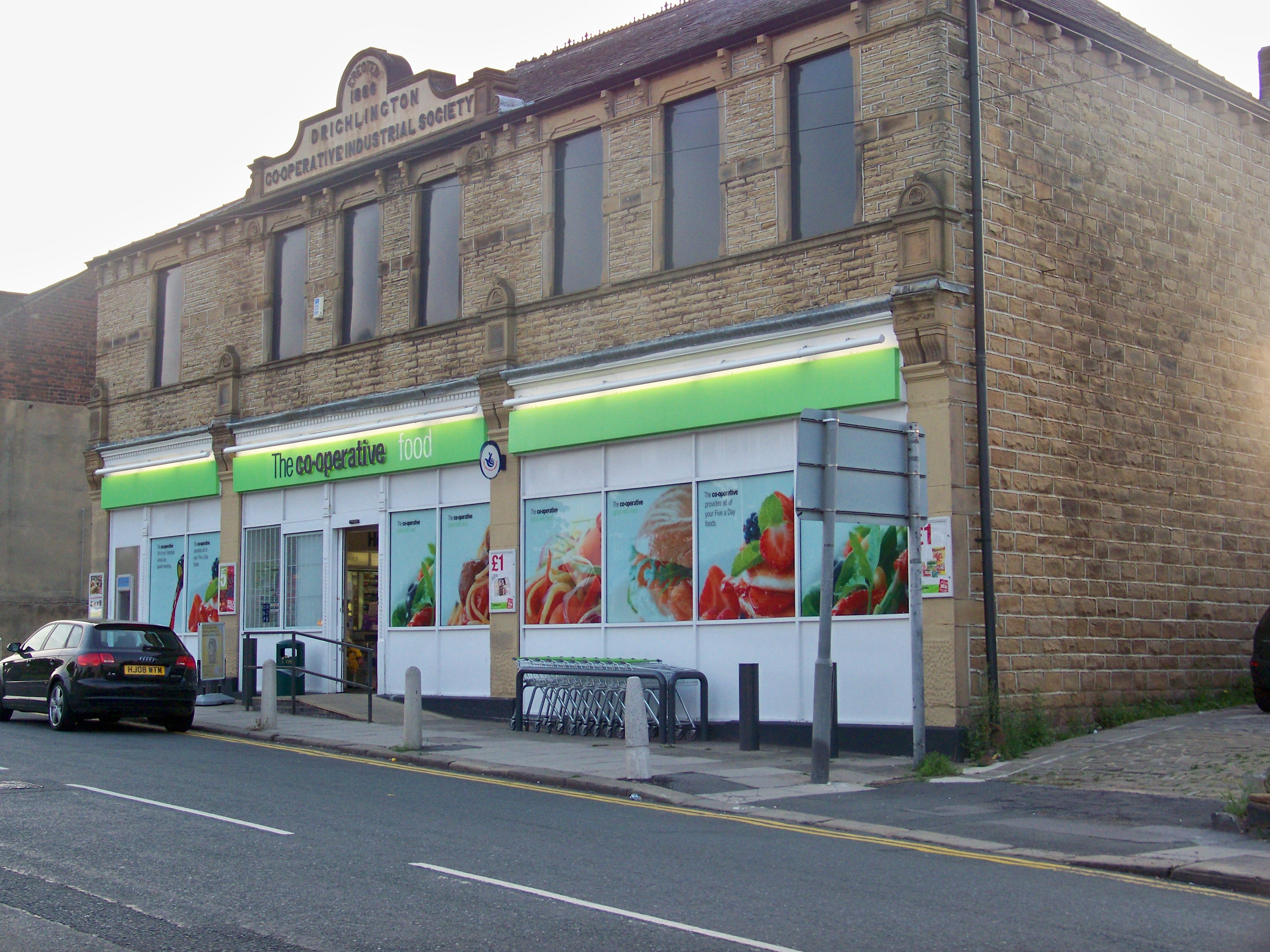
The Co-op

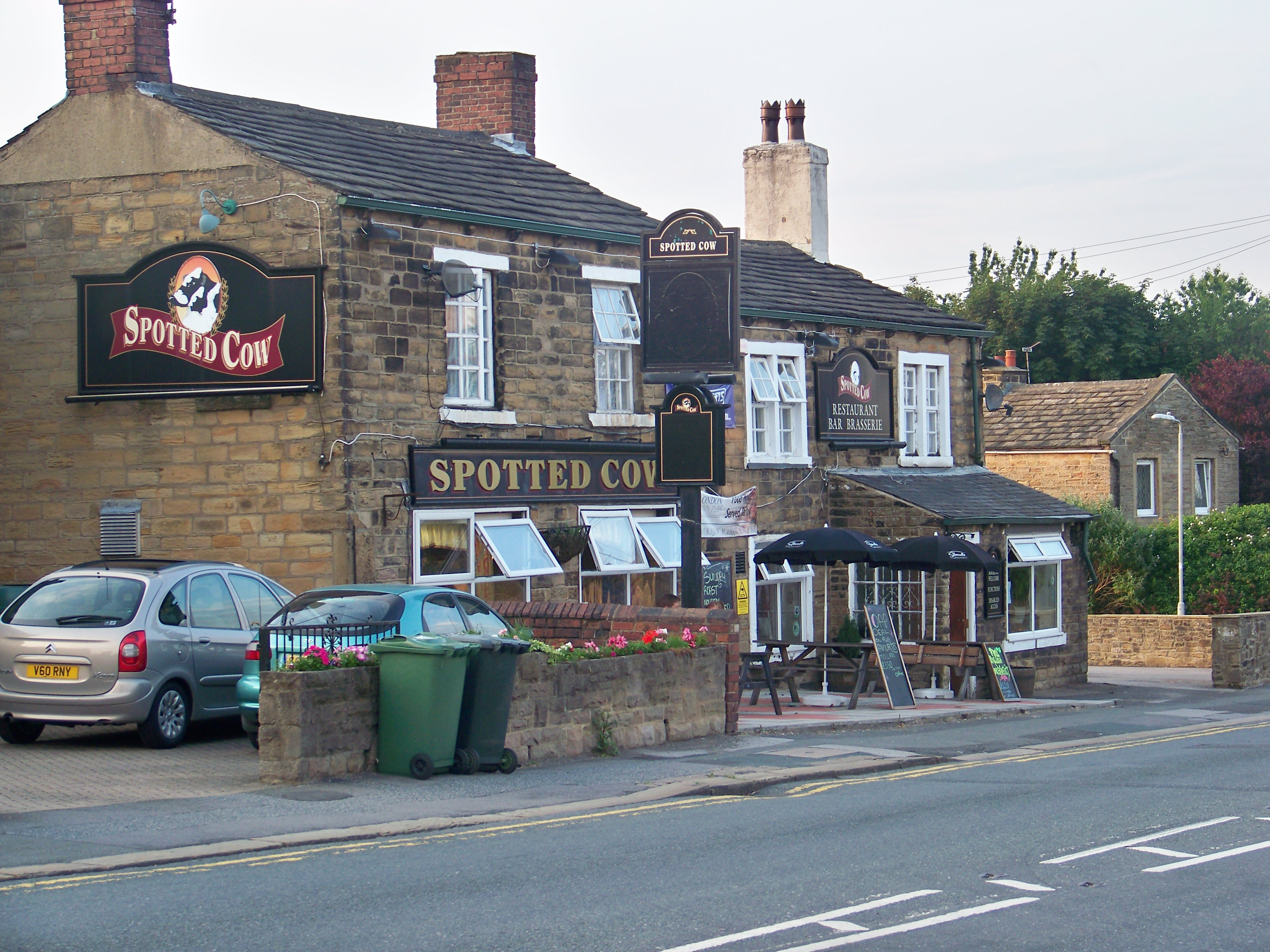
Spotted Cow.

=== Community facilities ===
The village has a small number of shops, a post office, a small library, a community centre and numerous public houses. From 2012 the library has been run by volunteers from Friends of Drighlington Community. The village also has a Co-operative store situated in the original Co-operative buildings, with the words Drighlington Industrial Co-operative Society embossed along the roofline.

St Paul's Church was built in 1878 and the foundation stone was laid by the Lord of the manor on 9 September 1876. It is a Grade II listed building. The church is part of the United Benefice of Drighlington and Gildersome.

=== Sport ===
Drighlington supports football, rugby league and cricket teams, including the Drighlington Amateur Rugby League Club, Adwalton Cricket Club, and Drighlington Cricket Club. There is "The Manor" golf course, a skate park, and a multi-use games area provided by the Parish Council.

== Transport ==
The nearest railway station is Morley that is served by Northern services to Leeds, Dewsbury, Huddersfield and Manchester. The only public transport still available in the village are bus services operated by Arriva Yorkshire.

Company	Route	Destinations
Arriva Yorkshire	254	Leeds city centre, Birkenshaw, Cleckheaton, Heckmondwike, Dewsbury
Arriva Yorkshire	255	Leeds city centre, Birkenshaw, Cleckheaton, Halifax
Arriva Yorkshire	425	Bradford city centre, Morley, Wakefield
Arriva Yorkshire	427	Bradford city centre, Morley, Wakefield

== Education ==
The village has one school: Drighlington Primary School. There are no secondary schools in Drighlington, however, there are three in neighbouring Morley, and one in neighbouring Farnley; all of these are secular comprehensive schools.

== See also ==
- Listed buildings in Drighlington
