= Battle of Seacroft Moor =

Battle on 30 March 1643 during the First English Civil War

- Part of the First English Civil War
| Date | 30 March 1643 |
| Location | Whinmoor moor near Seacroft; West Riding of Yorkshire 53.85°N 1.40°W |
| Result | Royalist victory |

Belligerents
| Royalists | Parliamentarians |

Commanders and leaders
| George Goring | Sir Thomas Fairfax |

Strength
| c. 20 troops horse | c. 2 troops horse 4,000 foot |

Casualties and losses
| Unknown | 100–200 killed 1,000 captured |

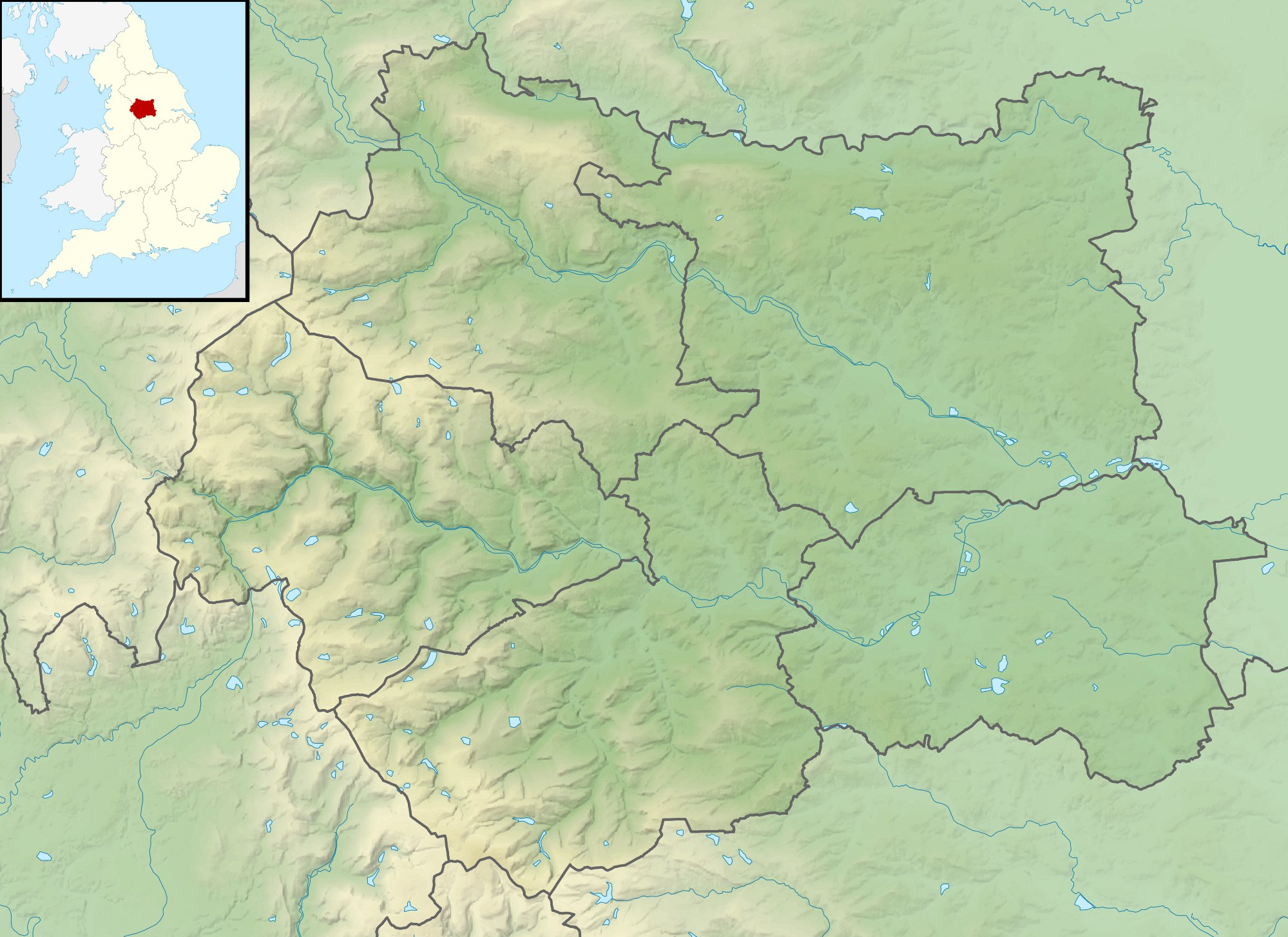
West Yorkshire and Seacroft

The Battle of Seacroft Moor took place in Whinmoor moor near the village of Seacroft, north-east of Leeds in West Riding on 30 March 1643 during the First English Civil War. In the battle, a Parliamentarian force commanded by Lieutenant-General Thomas Fairfax was decisively beaten by a Royalist cavalry force commanded by George Goring.

== Background ==
In December of 1642, the Earl of Newcastle brought his Royalist army south from Newcastle to reinforce and support King Charles and the Royalists in Yorkshire. Within the month of December, Newcastle captured a number of important towns including York, Tadcaster, and Leeds. In late January of 1643, the Parliamentarians fought back and partially restored the balance of power in northern England when they retook the town of Leeds.

Through the winter, the two opposing armies stood facing each other. Newcastle's field army was at Clifford Moor to the north-west of the occupied city of York. Ferdinando Lord Fairfax, the commander of the Parliamentarian army in the north of England had placed his field army 15 miles to the south of York at Selby. In Yorkshire, Parliamentary forces also held the important wool working towns of Leeds, Bradford, and Halifax in West Riding and the port of Hull.

On 22 February, Queen Henrietta Maria arrived at the Yorkshire port of Bridlington with war materials and English officers brought back to England to support the King. Queen Henrietta Maria's presence and the addition of the materials and officers to Newcastle's army were not only a boost to the Royalist effort in Yorkshire, but also persuaded at least one Parliamentarian Governor, Sir Hugh Cholmondeley of Scarborough, to switch sides and declare for the King.

Because of these changes in the strength of the Royalists in Yorkshire, Lord Fairfax felt vulnerable with the dispersed positions of his forces and decided that it would be advisable to move his field army from Selby to Leeds.

== Diversionary tactic ==
In order to move his army from Selby to Leeds without the risk of his slow artillery train being attacked while in transit, Lord Fairfax decided to create a diversion designed to keep Newcastle's forces from leaving their positions to pursue the Parliamentarian convoy. Lord Fairfax, ordered his son, Lieutenant-General Thomas Fairfax, to take a detachment of infantry accompanied by three troops of cavalry and attack Tadcaster, threatening York.

Thomas Fairfax did as ordered. Before he arrived at Tadcaster, the Royalist garrison fled. After spending a few hours in Tadcaster destroying the Royalist fortifications, the Parliamentarians left marching west to meet up with Lord Fairfax in Leeds. Meanwhile, Newcastle dispatched his cavalry commander, Goring, and 20 troops of horse to confront Fairfax's Parliamentarians.

== Battle ==
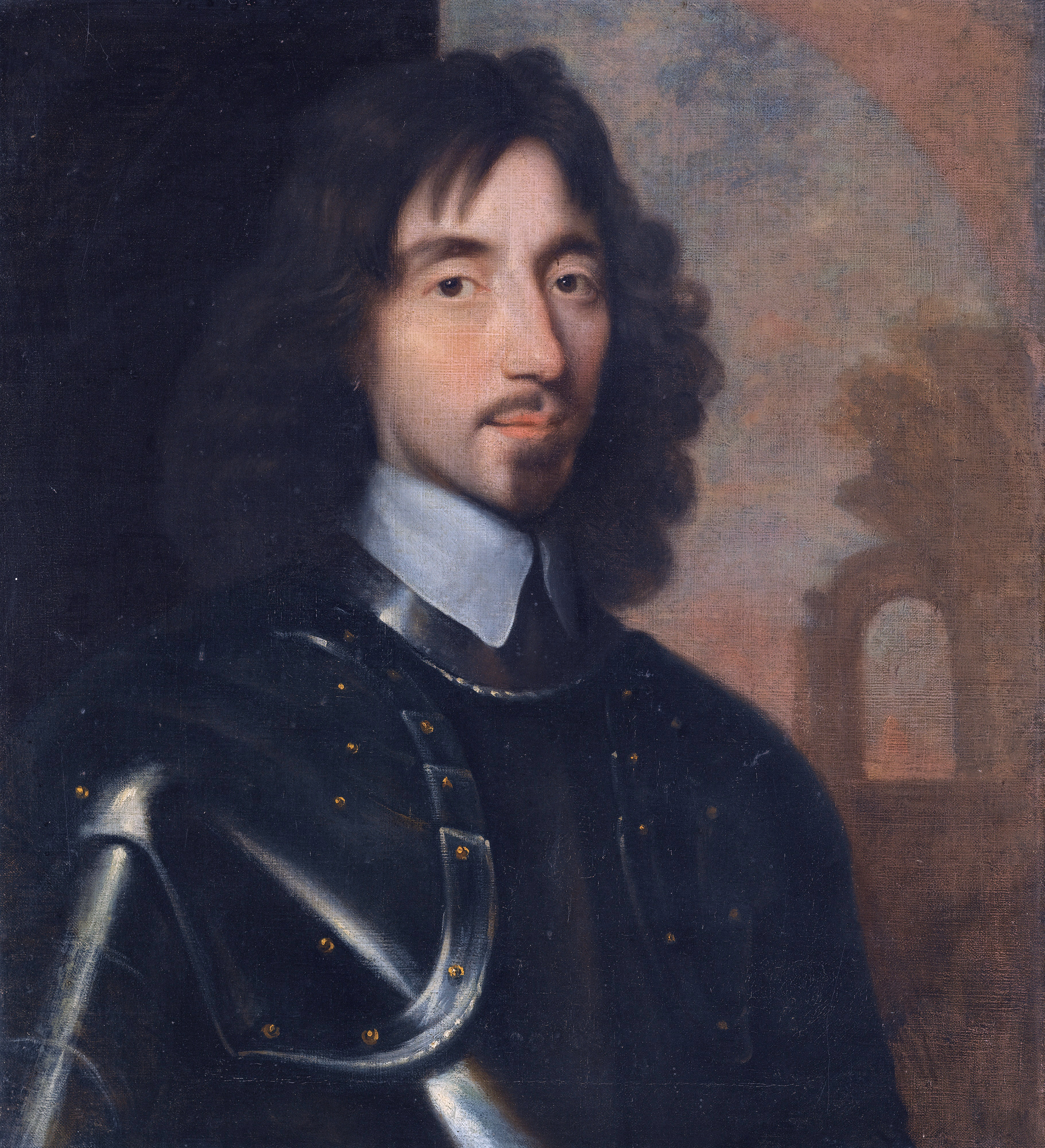
Sir Thomas Fairfax

Goring and his force tracked and reached the rearguard of the Parliamentarians before they had reach Bramham Moor. Fairfax, however, was able to use his small cavalry force and the narrow roadway to protect the Parliamentarian infantry that had been sent ahead. After the Royalists were repelled, Fairfax and his cavalry broke away and rode to catch up with the infantry units.

At Bramham Moor to his dismay, Fairfax found that the infantry composed largely of countrymen as opposed to disciplined professional soldiers, had stopped at the edge of the moor awaiting orders to proceed. Fairfax got his infantry to resume their march, but had to again defend against Goring's cavalry as the Parliamentarian foot crossed Bramham Moor. Once the Parliamentary infantry was across the moor they reached an area where the fields were enclosed providing the troops protection against the Royalist cavalry. Thinking that they were out of danger even though ahead of them lay another moor that Fairfax would call Seacroft Moor, the infantry soldiers broke rank seeking drink among the houses of a small village.

Once again, Fairfax and his officers, brought the soldiers to order and got them moving through a moor on the roadway to Leeds. Meanwhile, Goring and the Royalist cavalry had found a way to swing north around the enclosed fields in an undetected manner and attack the Parliamentarian infantry as they marched along. The final attack took place in the moor that Fairfax had called Seacroft Moor. The actual name of the moor, unbeknownst to Fairfax at the time, was Whinmoor.

At this point in the march to Leeds, Fairfax's infantry lines were not tight and compact. The tired soldiers had straggled and the units were extended along the length of the moor. Also, the Parliamentary infantry units did not include many experienced pikemen who could have helped to hold off the Royalist cavalry while the musketeers reloaded. The Royalists now attacked the Parliamentarian foot not only from the rear, but also along the flank. There was little that the smaller Parliamentarian cavalry could do to protect an extended line of infantry soldiers in the open moor. Fairly quickly, the countrymen threw down their arms and fled. Many were slain, greater numbers were taken prisoner. Some countrymen deserted and found their way back to their Yorkshire homes. The Parliamentarian cavalry could not withstand the charge and escaped west, along with Lieutenant-General Fairfax, eventually reaching Leeds.

Fairfax called the battle "one of the greatest losses we ever received …." It was estimated that as many as 200 Parliamentarians were killed and 1,000 taken prisoner. The number of Royalist casualties is unknown, but was estimated to be small.

== Aftermath ==
Lord Fairfax and the Parliamentary field army along with the artillery train reached Leeds safely, but at a horribly high cost considering the losses that occurred at Seacroft Moor.

Lieutenant-General Fairfax was castigated by the wives and families of the soldiers lost in the battle. The criticism was so great that on 21 May Fairfax launched an attack on the Royalist garrison at Wakefield to take prisoners that he might exchange for the men lost at Seacroft Moor.
