= Howley Hall =

Ruined country house in West Yorkshire

Coordinates: 53.722642°N 001.614974°W

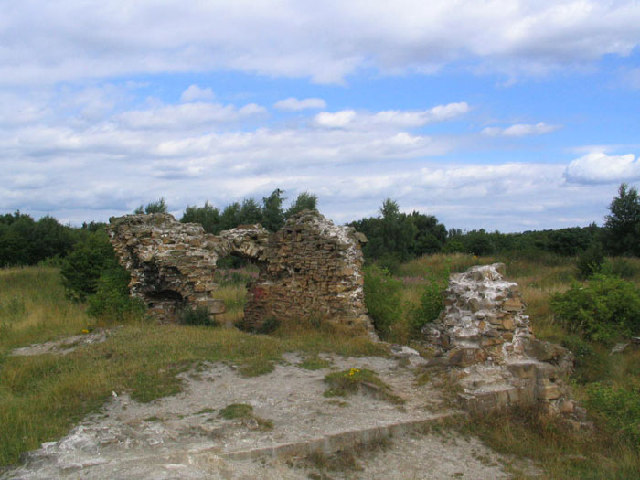
The ruins of Howley Hall (2005)

Howley Hall is a ruined Elizabethan country house located between the towns of Batley and Morley in West Yorkshire, England. It has been designated a scheduled monument since 1997.

The hall was built by Sir John Savile, a Yorkshire politician and courtier, at the end of the 16th century. It remained in the hands of the Savile family until 1671, and was the site of fighting during the English Civil War in 1643. Subsequently, it passed into the hands of the Brudenell family, under whose ownership the hall deteriorated and was eventually demolished between 1717 and 1730.

== History ==
Howley Hall was built by John Savile, 1st Baron Savile of Pontefract, probably between 1585 and 1590. Savile, who held a number of county offices in Yorkshire, was part of a new Protestant political elite that emerged from the English Reformation. Like many of his contemporaries, he sought to show his status through the construction of an impressive country house. He employed a local architect, Abraham Ackroyd, to design the hall, which was built in an Elizabethan style reminiscent of the work of Robert Smythson.

The hall remained in the possession of the Savile family for just under a century. Upon John's death in 1630 it was inherited by his son, Thomas Savile, 1st Earl of Sussex. During the English Civil War (1642–1651) Lord Sussex vacillated between supporting the Royalists and the Parliamentarians, but he left the Hall in the keeping of his relative Sir John Savile of Lupset, a Parliamentarian. Thomas Fairfax used it as a base of operations for the Parliamentary capture of Wakefield in May 1643, which prompted Royalist forces under the Earl of Newcastle to launch a retaliatory attack on Bradford. To ensure the Parliamentary garrison couldn't attack his rear, Newcastle marched on Howley Hall, and after a short siege, Sir John of Lupset surrendered. It then served as Newcastle's base in the decisive Battle of Adwalton Moor (some 4.5 kilometres (2.8 mi) to the northwest of Howley), which gave the Royalists control of Yorkshire until Marston Moor.

Although it is commonly believed locally that the hall was destroyed during the 1643 siege, it actually sustained little damage, and was returned to the Savile family when Lord Sussex defected to the Parliamentarians. After falling from favour in 1646, he retired to Howley and made significant additions to the building. In 1661 it was inherited by his son James Savile.

When James died without issue in 1671, the hall passed into the hands of Brudenell family: Frances, James' sister and heir, was married to the son of Robert Brudenell, 2nd Earl of Cardigan. Its deterioration probably began at this time, as although the Brudenell family owned it for two and a half centuries, they apparently had no interest in living there. After James Savile's death in 1671, it was rented out to three tenant families, and by 1711 local people had begun reusing the stone in other buildings. Records show that some of the furnishings were sold to the Old Presbyterian Chapel in Bradford in 1719, and others are known to have ended up in the nearby Chief Bailiff's House (now Howley Hall Golf Club) and Thorpe Hall in Thorpe on the Hill. To save the Brudenells the cost of maintenance, the buildings were finally demolished with gunpowder between 1717 and 1730, leaving the hall in its current ruined state.
