= Siege of Bridgwater (1645) =

Coordinates: 51.1°N 2.9°W

- Part of Wars of the Three Kingdoms
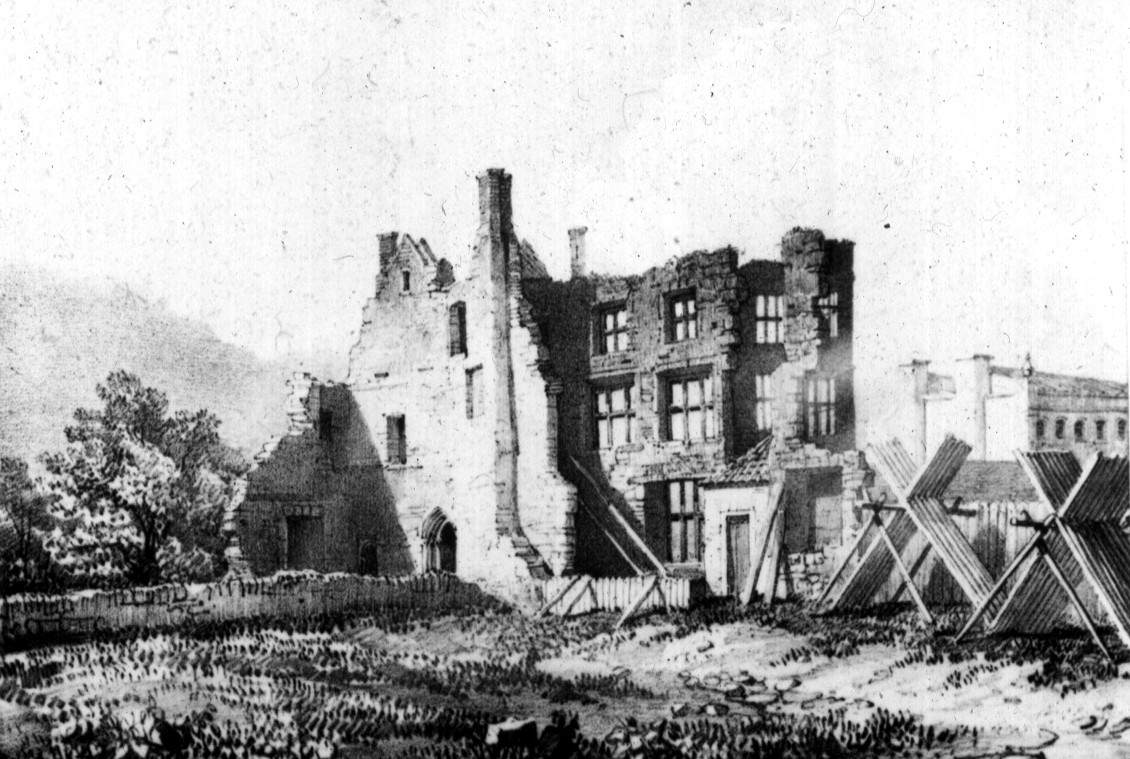
- Bridgwater Castle ruins, circa 1746
Date	13 to 23 July 1645
Location	Bridgwater, Somerset
Result	Parliamentarian victory

Belligerents
Royalists	(Kingdom of England) Parliamentarians

Commanders and leaders
Sir Edmund Wyndham; Robert Phillips; Sir Lodowick Dyer	(Kingdom of England) Sir Thomas Fairfax (Kingdom of England) Edward Massey (Kingdom of England) Oliver Cromwell

Strength
1,800	15,000 (maximum)

Casualties and losses
Minimal; 1,600 prisoners	20 dead, 100 wounded

The siege of Bridgwater took place in July 1645, during the First English Civil War, when a Royalist garrison surrendered to a Parliamentarian force under Sir Thomas Fairfax.

After their victory at Naseby in June, Fairfax and the New Model Army moved into Somerset, where they linked up with the Western Association Army led by Edward Massey. On 10 July, their combined force destroyed the last significant Royalist field army at Langport, clearing the way for an attack on Bridgwater.

Siege operations began on 13 July; on 21st, Parliamentarian forces stormed the western part of the town. Many of the buildings were set on fire, and the garrison capitulated on 23 July; over 1,600 prisoners were taken, along with large quantities of weapons and other stores.

The capture of Bridgwater meant Parliamentarian forces controlled a line of forts from the Bristol to the English Channels, isolating the Royalist West Country from the rest of England. Fairfax captured Bath and Sherborne, Dorset in August, then moved against Bristol in early September, the most significant port still in Royalist hands.

== Background ==
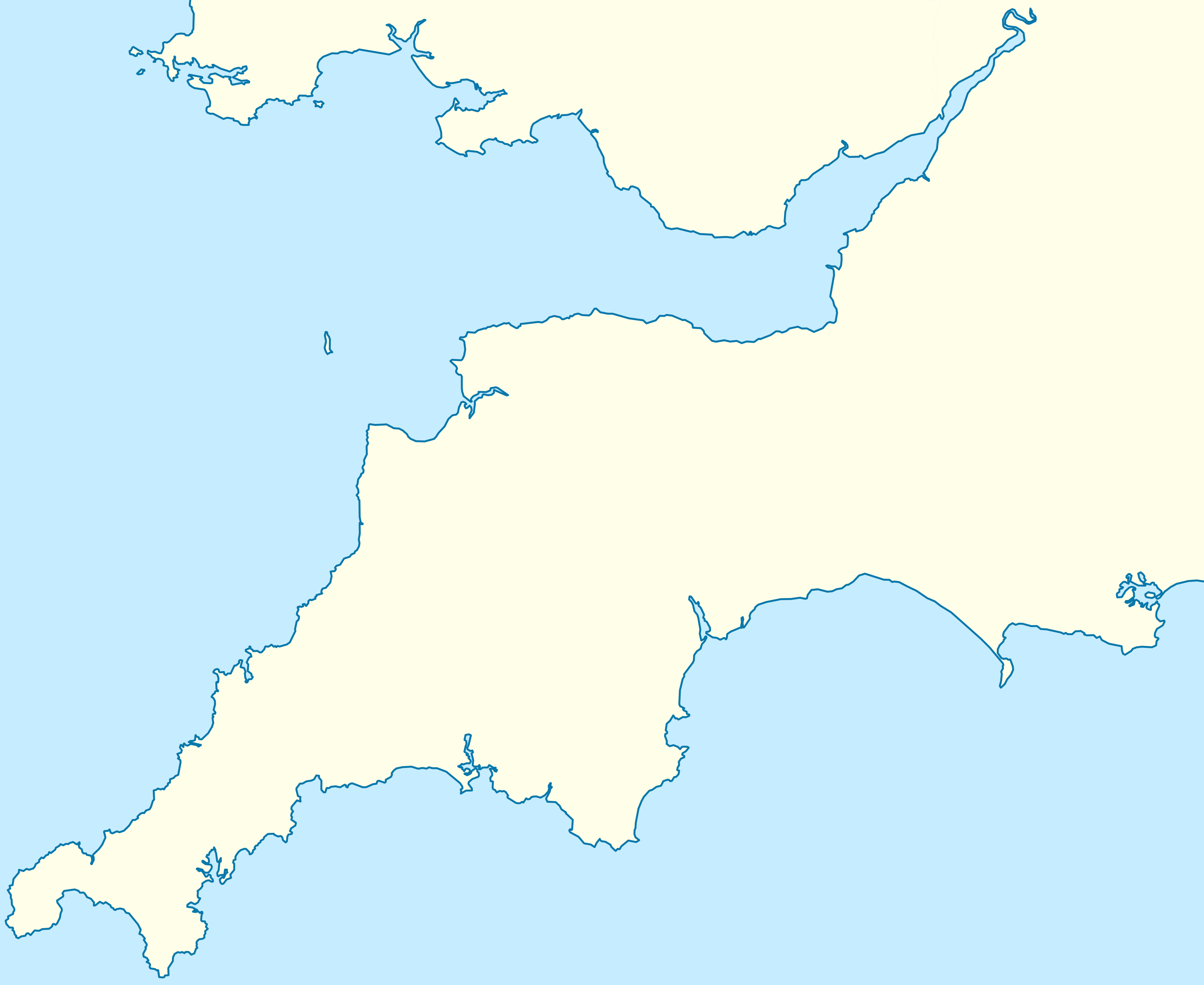
The 1645 campaign in the West

At the beginning of 1645, the Royalists still controlled most of the West Country, Wales, and counties along the English border. On 14 June, the New Model Army under Sir Thomas Fairfax won a decisive victory over Prince Rupert at Naseby. This left Lord Goring's Western Army as the last significant Royalist field force.

The New Model linked up with the Western Association Army under Edward Massey, and forced Goring to end the blockade of Taunton. The next day, Fairfax destroyed the Royalist Western Army at Langport. Before moving against the Royalist-held port of Bristol, he first had to secure his rear. Large parts of the West Country were controlled by Clubmen, local militia groups set up to resist depredations from either side, which were often a greater threat than the Royalists.

Many Royalist fugitives from Langport were killed by Somerset clubmen, in retaliation for the damage caused during their occupation. Regardless of political allegiance, the main objective for these groups was to end the war, and Fairfax persuaded their leaders withholding support from the Royalists was the quickest way to achieve this. They agreed to remain neutral, in return for assurances Parliament would pay for any supplies they took.

This enabled Fairfax to rest his men and collect supplies, before arriving at Bridgwater on 13 July. Prior to commencing siege operations, the New Model captured Sydenham Manor, directly east of the town. Massey cleared Royalist outposts at Hamp, giving him control of the high ground to the south, while a naval blockade prevented the garrison from being resupplied from the sea.

== Siege ==
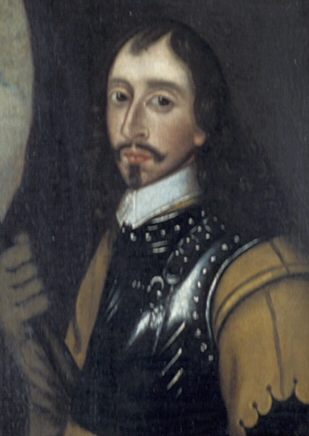
Edward Massey, commander of the Western Association

Bridgwater was positioned on either side of the River Parrett, which flowed into the sea at Bridgwater Bay, nearly 10 miles away; this made it an important commercial centre. Despite strong support for Parliament, it had been held by the Royalists since June 1643; its governor was Sir Edmund Wyndham, previously the local MP. After Langport, Goring retreated through the town into Devon, leaving most of his artillery, plus a garrison of around 1,800, well-supplied with provisions and ammunition.

The town was surrounded by a deep moat, 5.5 metres wide, connected to the sea, and thus filled at every tide. The main defences were on the western bank of the Parrett, including Bridgwater Castle; abandoned in the mid-16th century, its outer walls remained formidable, but were not designed to resist modern artillery. The defenders also constructed earthworks to the east, equipped with 40 guns, with an additional battery between the west and north gates.

A night attack from the northern side was attempted on 14 July, but abandoned after the storm parties discovered the water in the moat was too deep for the scaling ladders to reach the walls. The next few days were spent building siege works, hoping to blockade the town; however, it was decided this was taking too long, and another assault was planned.

1,200 men were selected by lot, divided into a main party of 600, and two smaller ones of 400 and 200. At 2:00 am on Monday 21 July, Massey's guns opened fire from the south, while the storm parties crossed the Parrett using three pontoon bridges. Despite heavy fire from the castle, much of it was misdirected and casualties were relatively light, with 20 dead and 100 wounded. The east gate was quickly seized and opened, allowing the main Parliamentarian force to enter; by midday, they had taken 600 prisoners, and the Royalists held only the western half of the town.

Much of the eastern section caught fire, accounts vary as to who was responsible; the garrison was offered terms, which they refused. A second assault was planned for Tuesday 22 July; by now, it was clear the defenders were in a hopeless position, and Fairfax allowed over 800 non-combatants to leave. They then commenced firing into the Royalist-held area of the town, which was soon ablaze; terms were agreed upon, and the garrison formally surrendered on Wednesday 23 July.

== Aftermath ==
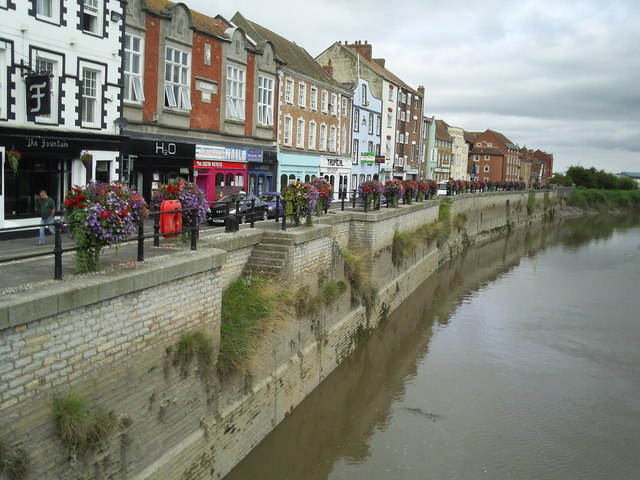
The former West Quay; Bridgwater was an important inland port

According to the etiquette of the time, if a garrison surrendered prior to the walls being breached, they were allowed to march out with their possessions, and given a free pass to the nearest friendly position. This was not the case at Bridgwater; most of the 1,500 rank and file switched sides, while more than 200 officers, and numerous Royalist officials were held prisoner.

Fairfax also captured 40 pieces of artillery, powder, and a 'great store of musquets', left behind by Goring. Most of his infantry deserted after Langport, demoralised by defeat; even if he could raise fresh troops, this crippled his ability to equip them.

Sir Edmund Wyndham was held until 1649, when he joined Charles II in exile, returning only after the 1660 Restoration. His son Hugh was also taken prisoner, but escaped, and took service with the Royalist fleet commanded by Prince Rupert. He was recaptured in 1649, trying to break out of Kinsale, but survived to become an MP for Minehead in 1661.

Bridgwater was badly damaged by the siege, and did not recover economically for many years; in December 1647, Fairfax wrote a letter to Parliament, asking that taxes on the town be reduced 'owing to its great losses in the recent siege.'

== Sources ==
- Cassidy, Irene (1983). WYNDHAM, Edmund (c.1600-81), of Kentsford, St. Decuman's, Somerset, and Pall Mall, Westminster:in the House of Commons 1660–1690 (Online ed.). CUP.
- Dunning, Robert (1995). Somerset Castles. Somerset Books. ISBN 978-0-86183-278-1.
- Green, Emmanuel (1877). Siege of Bridgwater, July, 1645. Proc. Somerset Archaeological and Nat Hist Soc.
- Jarman, Sydney Gardnor (1889). The Siege of Bridgwater, Chapter IX in The History of Bridgwater (PDF). Elliott Stock. p. 6.
- Höbelt, Lothar (2012). Afflerbach, Holger; Strachan, Hew (eds.). Surrender in the Thirty-Years War in How Fighting Ends: A History of Surrender. OUP. ISBN 978-0199693627.
- Hopper, Andrew (2012). Turncoats and Renegadoes: Changing Sides During the English Civil Wars. OUP. ISBN 978-0199575855.
- Hutton, Ronald (2004). "Goring, George, Baron Goring". Oxford Dictionary of National Biography (online ed.). Oxford University Press. doi:10.1093/ref:odnb/11100. (Subscription, Wikipedia Library access or UK public library membership required.)
- Royle, Trevor (2004). Civil War: The War of the Three Kingdoms 1638-1660. Brown, Little. ISBN 978-0316861250.
- Staab, John (2002). "Riotous or Revolutionary: The Clubmen during the English Civil Wars" (PDF). Early Modern Revolutions.
- Underdown, David (1973). Somerset in the Civil War and Interregnum. David & Charles. ISBN 978-0715358054.
- Wedgwood, CV (1958). The King's War, 1641-1647 (2001 ed.). Penguin Classics. ISBN 978-0141390727.
