= Edmund Wyndham =

Member of Parliament between 1625 and 1679

Sir Edmund Wyndham MP, JP
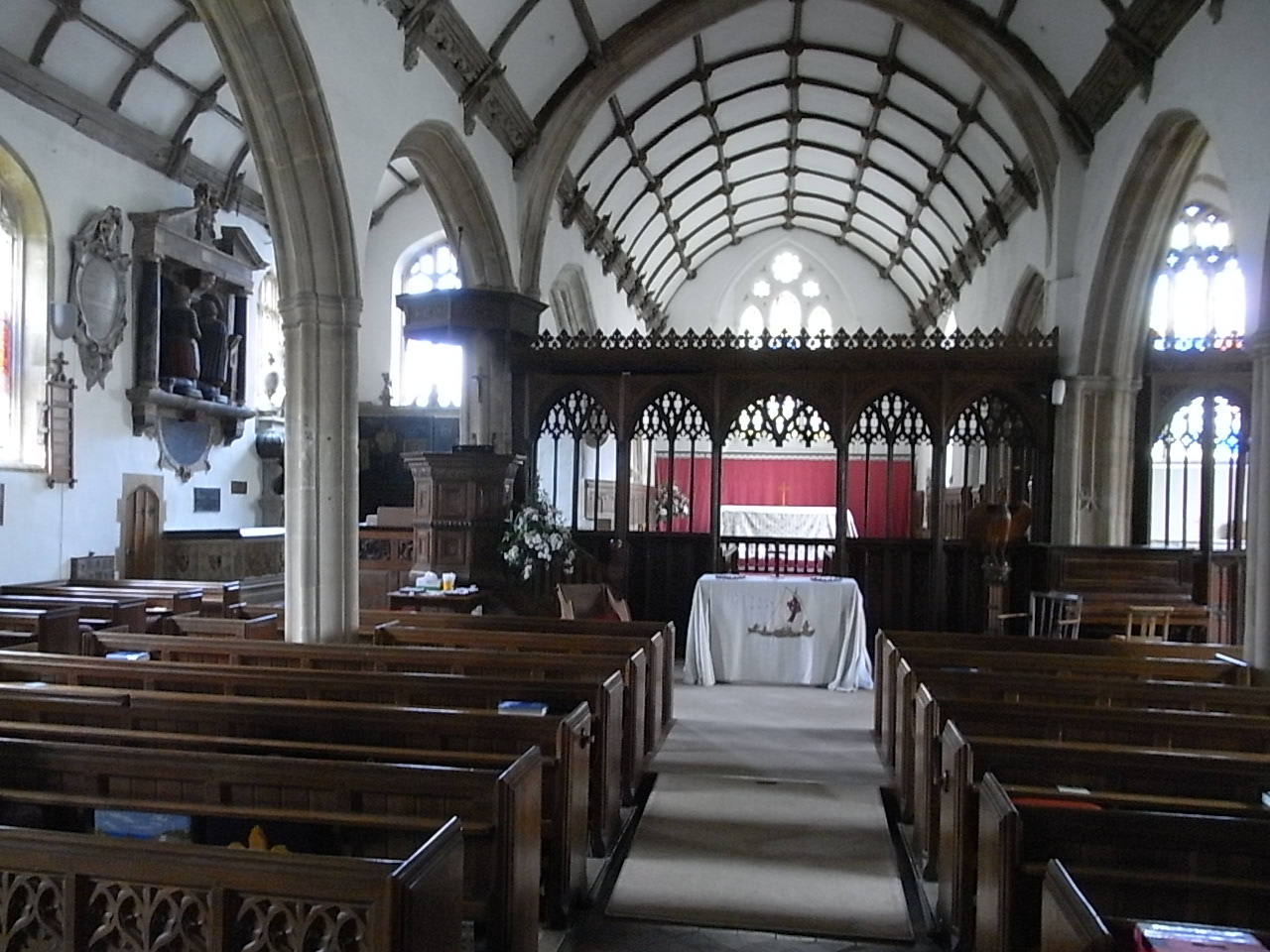
- St Decuman's, Wyndham Chapel

Knight Marshal
- In office 1667 – 1681 †

MP for Bridgwater
- In office April 1661 – January 1679

Deputy Lieutenant of Somerset
- In office 1660 – 1681 †
- Monarch: Charles II

MP for Minehead
- In office March 1628 – June 1629

Personal details
- Born: circa 1600 Kentsford House, (Note: Kentsford Farm lies in a valley beside the Washford river on the extreme western edge of the parish. It is of two storeys with attics on an irregular L-shaped plan. The west wing, facing the river, may retain the plan of a late medieval house. It appears to have been largely rebuilt c. 1600 when it became the cross wing to a hall range running eastwards and entered by opposing doorways with a porch on the south. Further alterations seem to have taken place in the late 17th century when a kitchen fireplace was put into the south room of the cross wing, and the room beyond the entrance passage was made into a parlour.) Somerset
- Died: March 2, 1681 (aged 80) Whitehall, London
- Resting place: St Decuman's Church, Watchet
- Spouse(s): Christabella Pyne (d.1658); Elizabeth Savage
- Relations: Sir Francis Wyndham
- Children: Three sons, one daughter
- Parent(s): Sir Thomas Wyndham, Elizabeth Coningsby (died 1635)
- Education: Wadham College, Oxford

Military service
- Allegiance: Royalist 1642-1646
- Rank: Colonel
- Commands: Governor of Bridgwater 1643-1645
- Battles/wars: First English Civil War; Taunton Bridgwater

Sir Edmund Wyndham (1601 – 2 March 1681) was a Somerset landowner, and Member of Parliament on different occasions between 1625 and 1679. He supported the Parliamentary opposition to Charles I, until 1630, when his wife was appointed wet-nurse to the Prince of Wales.

Thereafter, he was given a number of government pensions, and was expelled from the Long Parliament in 1641 as a monopolist. When the First English Civil War began in 1642, he was a prominent leader of the Royalists in the West Country, and appointed Commissioner of Array for Somerset.

He served as governor of Bridgwater from 1643, until its surrender to Parliamentarian forces in July 1645. He was held in custody until 1649, when he escaped to join Charles II in exile, returning only after the 1660 Restoration.

Although he was elected to the Cavalier Parliament in 1661, and appointed Knight Marshal in 1667, he failed to obtain what he considered adequate reimbursement for his losses in the civil war.

He died in March 1681.

== Biography ==
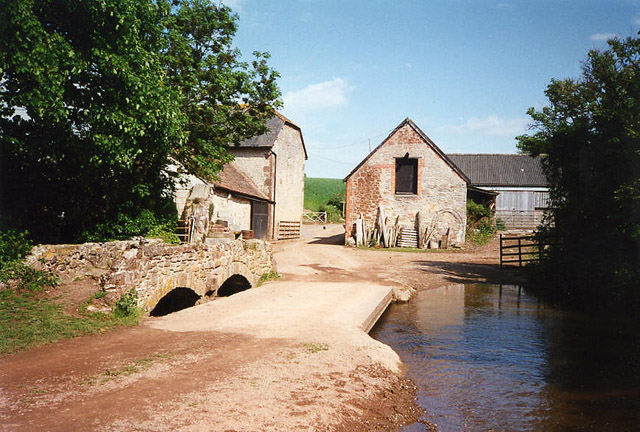
Remains of Kentsford House, now farm; Edmund was the last Wyndham to live here

Edmund Wyndham was born around 1600, eldest son of Sir Thomas Wyndham (1570-1631), and his wife Elizabeth Coningsby (died 1635). His father came from the Kentsford Wyndhams, a cadet branch of the Orchard Wyndhams, a numerous and powerful grouping within the Somerset gentry. He was one of five sons, including Sir Francis Wyndham (1612-1676); the other three died during the 1638 to 1651 Wars of the Three Kingdoms.

In 1623, he married Christabella Pyne, who was appointed nurse to the Prince of Wales in 1631. They had four surviving children; Hugh (1624-1671), Thomas (1628-1713), Carolina (1634-1721), and Charles (1638-1706). In 1667, he married Elizabeth Savage; they had no children.

== Career ==
=== Pre-1642 ===
He was educated at Wadham College, Oxford and entered Lincoln's Inn to study law in 1620, then considered part of the education required for a gentleman. He sat as Member of Parliament for Minehead in the 1625 and 1628 Parliaments, when supported the Parliamentary opposition to Charles I.

This changed when his wife was appointed wet-nurse to the infant prince in 1630, and he received various government posts and pensions. From 1629 to 1640, Charles ruled without Parliament, leading to a constant search for new sources of revenue; the most famous was ship money, others included the right to manufacture soap. Wyndham was appointed a 'soap searcher', a monopoly resented for various reasons, one being the right of 'searchers' to enter private houses, and remove 'illicit' materials.

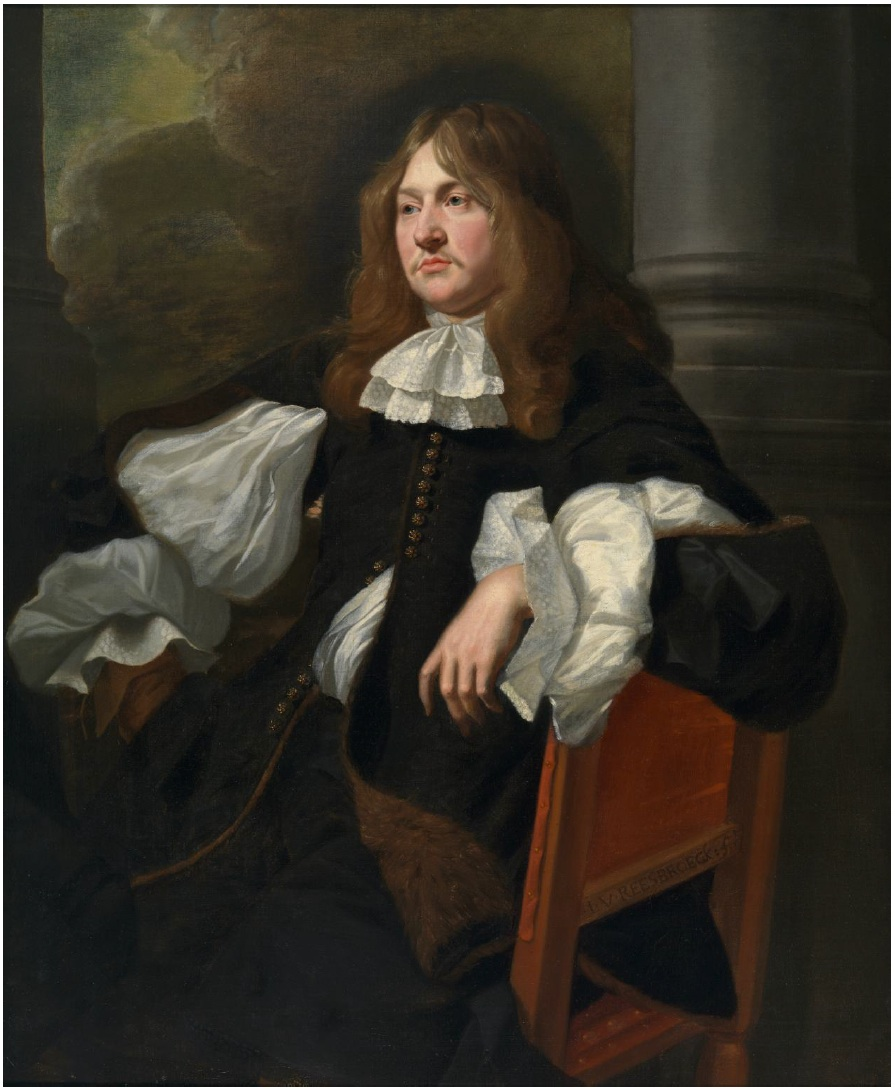
Wyndham's political opponent, the Earl of Clarendon, ca 1653

Like Charles, Wyndham invested heavily in fenland reclamation, an undertaking that caused considerable local unrest, constant legal challenges, vast expense, and not completed until the 1650s. These losses forced him to mortgage his estates; in April 1640, he was returned as MP for Bridgwater in the Short Parliament. Elected again in November 1640 to the Long Parliament, he was expelled in January 1641 as a monopolist.

=== 1642 to 1646 ===
When the First English Civil War began in August 1642, Charles appointed him a Commissioner of Array for Somerset. He became a Colonel in the Royalist army, and recruited two regiments from the Somerset Trained Bands, the second commanded by his son, Sir Hugh. He became governor of Bridgwater in 1643, and supervised the blockade of the Parliamentarian stronghold of Taunton in September 1644. After attempts to storm the town failed, he tried to starve the defenders out; in December, a Parliamentarian force under James Holborne reinforced the town, and Wyndham withdrew to Bridgwater.

On 14 June 1645, the New Model Army under Sir Thomas Fairfax won a decisive victory over Prince Rupert at Naseby. The New Model linked up with the Western Association Army under Edward Massey, and forced Lord Goring to retreat from Taunton. The next day, Fairfax destroyed the Royalist Western Army at Langport.

Despite being strongly held, Bridgwater surrendered on 23 July 1645; Wyndham was captured, and imprisoned until 1649. He made his way to Jersey, where he joined Charles II, but took no part in the Third English Civil War, although his brother Francis helped Charles escape after the Battle of Worcester in 1651.

=== 1647 to 1681 ===
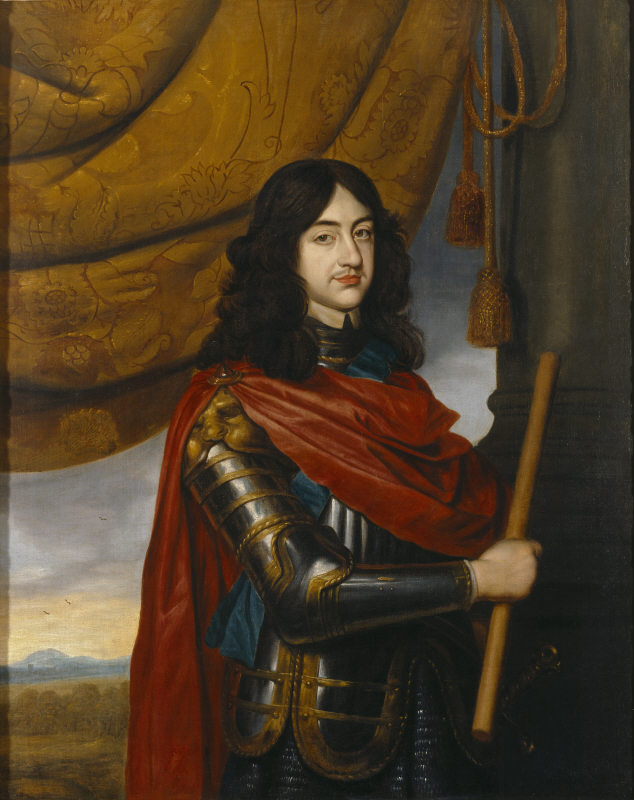
Charles II in exile

His status with Charles weakened when his wife Christabella died in 1653, while soon after, he fell out with the Earl of Clarendon. Along with Sir Richard Grenville, and other political opponents, he accused him of being a traitor, in the pay of Oliver Cromwell.

As well making Clarendon a confirmed enemy, this incensed Charles, and he was excluded from political office after the Restoration. Although he represented Bridgwater in the 1661 to 1679 Cavalier Parliament, and was appointed Deputy Lieutenant of Somerset, there were too many seeking rewards for Charles to satisfy them all. Despite claiming to have spent over £60,000 in the kings service, Wyndham had to be content with an appointment as Knight Marshal in 1667, which he claimed brought in only £1,200 per annum.

When his son Sir Hugh died in 1671, his tombstone similarly recorded his disappointment at not being properly compensated for his service. Edmund died in London at the age of 80, and was buried in the family vault in St Decuman's Church, Watchet. His grandson Edmund became his heir; in 1690, his second wife, Elizabeth Savage, claimed she was near starvation due to his failure to pay her allowance.

== Sources ==
- Cassidy, Irene (1983). WYNDHAM, Edmund (c.1600-81), of Kentsford, St. Decuman's, Somerset, and Pall Mall, Westminster in The History of Parliament: the House of Commons 1660–1690 (Online ed.). CUP. ISBN 978-1107002258.
- Cressy, David (2015). Charles I and the People of England. OUP. ISBN 978-0198708292.
- Cunningham, Jack (2017). James Ussher and John Bramhall: The Theology and Politics of Two Irish Ecclesiastics of the Seventeenth Century. Routledge. ISBN 978-0815389910.
- Hughes, John (1830). The Boscobel Tracts; the escape of Charles II after the Battle of Worcester. Blackwood & Cadell.
- Knittl, Margaret (2007). "The design for the initial drainage of the Great Level of the Fens: an historical whodunit in three parts". Agricultural History Review. 55 (1).
- Gibson, William (2007). Religion and the Enlightenment: 1600 to 1800 Conflict and the Rise of Civic Humanism in Taunton. Verlag Peter Lang. ISBN 978-3039109227.
- Newman, Peter (1993). The Old Service: Royalist Regimental Colonels and the Civil War, 1642-46. Manchester University Press. ISBN 978-0719037528.
- "Parishes; St Decuman, including Watchet and Williton". British History Online.
- Wedgwood, CV (1958). The King's War, 1641-1647 (2001 ed.). Penguin Classics. ISBN 978-0141390727.
- Yerby, Irene (2010). Minehead in The History of Parliament: the House of Commons 1604-1629 (Online ed.). CUP. ISBN 978-1107002258.

Parliament of England
Vacant Parliament suspended since 1629 Title last held by Thomas Smith and Sir Thomas Wroth	Member of Parliament for Bridgwater; 1640–1641; With: Robert Blake 1640; Sir Peter Wroth	Succeeded by Sir Peter Wroth; Thomas Smith
