= Sieges of Taunton =

Series of three blockades during the First English Civil War

- Part of the First English Civil War
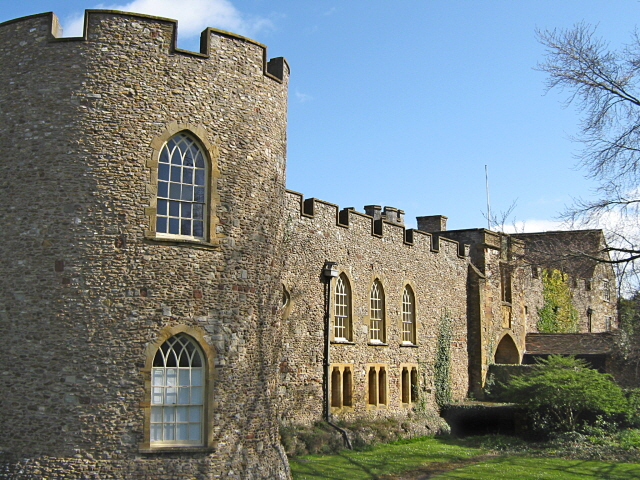
- Taunton Castle
Date	September 1644 – July 1645
Location	Taunton, Somerset 51.019°N 3.100°W
Result	Parliamentarian victory

Belligerents
Royalists	Parliamentarians

Commanders and leaders
First siege Sir Edmund Wyndham; Second siege Sir Richard Grenville, Bt; Sir John Berkeley; Sir Ralph Hopton; Third siege Lord Goring	Garrison; Robert Blake; First relief James Holborne; Second relief Ralph Weldon; Third relief Thomas Fairfax
- Location of Taunton within Somerset

The sieges of Taunton were a series of three blockades during the First English Civil War. The town of Taunton, in Somerset, was considered to be of strategic importance because it controlled the main road from Bristol to Devon and Cornwall. Robert Blake commanded the town's Parliamentarian defences during all three sieges, from September 1644 to July 1645.

The first siege was laid by Edmund Wyndham on 23 September, and was primarily composed of Royalist troops from local Somerset garrisons. After initial assaults drove Blake and his troops back into Taunton Castle, the blockade was conducted from 1–2 miles (1.6–3.2 km) away, and concentrated more on starving the garrison than continued attacks. The town was relieved by a force under James Holborne on 14 December.

Over the next three months, Blake was able to establish a network of earthen defences in Taunton, including a basic perimeter and several forts. The Royalists began the second, and bloodiest, siege in late March 1645, initially under Sir Richard Grenville. A series of disputes between the Royalist commanders allowed Taunton some respite at the start of the siege, but in May the attacks were fierce under the command of Sir Ralph Hopton. After five days of intense fighting, which had once again driven the defending army back to a small central perimeter including the castle, the Royalists retreated in the face of a Parliamentarian relief army commanded by Ralph Weldon.

Lord Goring, who had proposed the second siege, renewed the blockade for a third time in mid-May, after engaging Weldon's departing army and forcing it back into Taunton. Goring's siege was lax and allowed provisions into the town, diminishing its effectiveness. The Parliamentarian defence tied up Goring and his 10–15,000 troops, who would have otherwise been available to fight for King Charles at Naseby, where historians believe they could have tipped the battle in favour of the Royalists. Instead, after securing a Parliamentarian victory at Naseby, Thomas Fairfax marched his army to relieve Taunton on 9 July 1645.

== Background ==
Loyalties in Somerset were divided at the start of the First English Civil War; many of the prominent landowners and those living in the countryside favoured King Charles I, but most of the towns, including Taunton, were Parliamentarian, predominantly due to their Puritan beliefs. By August 1642, the town was held by a small Parliamentarian force. In June the following year, Sir Ralph Hopton led his Royalist army, consisting of eighteen regiments equally split between foot and cavalry, out of Cornwall and into Somerset. He forced the surrender of Taunton to the King without engaging in battle, and established a garrison in Taunton Castle. (Note: In his History of Taunton, Joshua Toulmin suggests that in the time between Hopton claiming Taunton for the Royalists, and the Parliamentarian capture under Pye and Blake, the town changed hands twice, first returning to Parliamentarian governance, when Sir William Waller's forces took the town, but then back into Royalist hands under the army led by William Seymour, Marquess of Hertford, though no other sources mention this, and it seems unlikely given the records of Waller's movements.)

In mid-1644, Robert Devereux, 3rd Earl of Essex, the Chief Commander of the Parliamentary army, decided to reclaim the West Country. He moved through Dorset, retaking Dorchester and Weymouth, and then left the coast and headed towards Chard. At the time, Taunton was held by a garrison of 800 men commanded by Colonel John Stawell, but the proximity of the Earl of Essex's army led the town to be abandoned, leaving only 80 men to defend the castle. The historian Robert Morris, in The Sieges of Taunton 1644–1645, suggests that Stawell and his men retreated to Bridgwater, but in The History of the Rebellion, the 17th-century historian Edward Hyde claims that the troops were requisitioned by Prince Maurice during his retreat from Lyme Regis to Plymouth.

On 8 July 1644, the Earl of Essex sent a Parliamentarian force, led by Colonel Sir Robert Pye with Lieutenant Colonel Robert Blake as his second in command, to reclaim Taunton. They took the town without a fight, and surrounded the castle. The Royalist forces under Major William Reeve that were garrisoned at Taunton Castle surrendered and retreated to Bridgwater. (Note: Reeve was court-martialled and sentenced to death by the Royalists for his actions, but escaped and switched his allegiance to the Parliamentarians.) Pye left Taunton shortly after the capture, leaving Blake to hold the town. Blake had an army of about 1,000 men, and was charged with trying to blockade the roads to support the Earl of Essex's campaign in Devon and Cornwall.

== Sieges ==
=== First siege ===
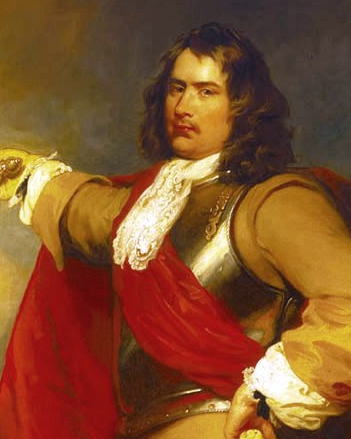
Robert Blake commanded the Parliamentarian defence of Taunton during the sieges.

The Earl of Essex's campaign failed, suffering a total defeat at the Battle of Lostwithiel in early September 1644. His remaining forces retreated back to Dorset, leaving only Plymouth, Lyme Regis and Taunton under Parliamentarian control in the South West. Blake was aware of the vulnerability of Taunton, which, unlike many towns and cities of the time, did not have any town walls. On the eastern side of the town, which was the most vulnerable, he dug trenches outside the Eastern gate and erected a barricade across the street within it. At least three earthen forts were also built in that end of town. King Charles I held council in Chard, and shortly after ordered a Royalist force numbering 3,000 troops to set up the first siege of Taunton. Initially, Sir Francis Dodington was going to command the attack, but the only available men were those in Bridgwater under the command of Colonel Edmund Wyndham.

The siege began on 23 September 1644. Wyndham was assisted in the attack by his brother, Francis Wyndham, who brought his garrison from Dunster Castle, and Edward Rodney, who commanded an infantry regiment. The Royalist forces initially set themselves up around the town, where they were able to use their artillery to bombard the castle from the west and the town from the east. In his record of the siege, Morris claims that the besieging forces were unable to establish a presence in the town, and set up a wide perimeter roughly 1–2 miles (1.6–3.2 km) away. However, almost all other sources agree that after initial skirmishes, the Royalists broke through the eastern defences and forced Blake's troops back into the castle itself.

During the siege, Edmund Wyndham and Blake exchanged letters; Wyndham initially wrote to explain that he felt the siege was a gentle method of attack, rather than using "fire and sword". He offered generous terms for surrender, and signed the letter "Your well-wishing Neighbour and Country-man"; the pair had served as members of parliament together for Bridgwater in 1640. Blake was unmoved, and wrote back to unequivocally reject the offer. Blake sent skirmishing parties out against the attackers with some success, though food and ammunition began to run out for the defending troops. To further this, Wyndham heavily rationed the town's population to prevent them smuggling food to the garrison. A petition to Parliament for help was answered when Sir William Waller, who commanded the Parliamentarian army in Wiltshire, sent a force of 3,000 men under the command of his deputy, Major General James Holborne, in support of the town.

Wyndham had initially planned to attack Holborne's forces at Chard, but instead retreated back to his garrison at Bridgwater on 14 December. He recorded that during his retreat, "the enemy sallied upon me but they were so hungry that they could not follow me." The day after the arrival of Holborne, a supply caravan containing food, 2,000 muskets and 40 barrels of gunpowder restocked the town. Fearing further Royalist assaults, Holborne provided 1,000 of his own men as reinforcements for the town's defence.

=== Second siege ===
In early 1645, Blake sent raiding parties out from Taunton that, according to Hyde, controlled a large area and disrupted activities throughout Somerset. Around that time, Lord Goring, the lieutenant-general of the south-eastern counties in the Royalist army, requested troops from the King so that he could mount a "large-scale southeastern campaign". His request was rejected, and he was despatched to the South West instead. He duly changed his focus, electing to target first Weymouth, and then Taunton, both Parliamentarian strongholds in the area. He took Weymouth, but was unable to hold it in the face of Parliamentarian reinforcements. In a letter he received from the King shortly after that loss, he was ordered to gather the Royalist forces of the area together in order to "[clear] those parts of the rebels' forces."

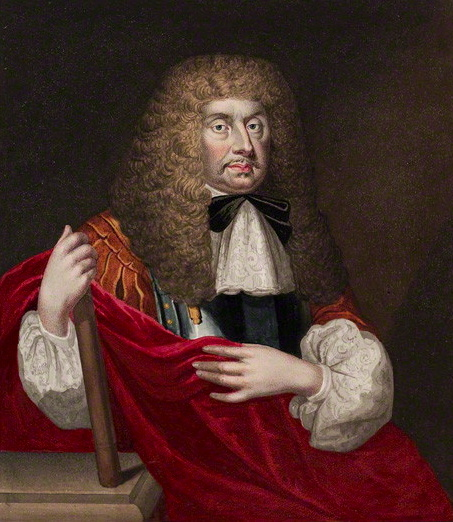
John Berkeley, 1st Baron Berkeley of Stratton struggled to assert his authority over the Royalist troops.

The King sent orders for Sir Richard Grenville and John Berkeley to support Goring in the attack on Taunton. Goring arrived outside Taunton on 11 March, and a sizeable part of Berkeley's garrison from Exeter arrived soon after. Grenville did not leave his siege of Plymouth and, coupled with the threat from a Parliamentarian force formed by Waller and Oliver Cromwell combining their armies in Hampshire, the attack on Taunton was postponed. After further urging from the King and the Prince of Wales, Grenville did eventually travel up towards Taunton and was ordered to follow Goring to support the King in the north, as Grenville's force of 3,000 men was considered too small to assault Taunton. He refused, claiming that "he had promised the commissioners of Devon and Cornwall, that he would not advance beyond Taunton", while also boasting that he could claim the town in ten days. He was delegated command of the siege, and arrived outside Taunton on 2 April. Only a day after his arrival, Grenville was injured while attacking Wellington House, and as the wound was serious, he was carried to Exeter.

The blockade set by Grenville was initially some distance from the town, and did not prevent Blake from sending and receiving messages. The besieging army was reinforced soon after with Goring's infantry and artillery units, and so, with a large force, the attackers closed in on the town, establishing entrenchments within musket-shot of Taunton's defences. Command of the siege passed to Berkeley, though Grenville's troops often failed to follow the new commander's orders, and some of them deserted. Despite Grenville's retirement from the battle due to injury, he and Berkeley clashed; Grenville complained to the Prince of Wales that Berkeley was conducting the siege badly, while Berkeley claimed that Grenville had given his men orders to desert. These disagreements led Hopton, by now the commander of the Royalist forces in the West Country, to be given command of the siege.

As the siege continued, supplies once again began to run out for the defending army, and Parliament identified the relief of Taunton as being a priority. On 28 April, they ordered Thomas Fairfax, the Commander in Chief of the recently established New Model Army, to relieve the town. Fairfax marched with the whole of his army towards Taunton; the Royalists considered sending their own army to meet him before he could reach London, but Prince Rupert convinced them instead to focus on conquering the north of England. In response to the Royalist movement north, Fairfax split his own army in two, sending a force of between 6,000 and 7,000 on to Taunton under Colonel Ralph Weldon, while Fairfax led the rest north.

Aware that the Parliamentarians under Fairfax were on their way, Hopton increased the attacks on the town on 6 May. Further attacks the following day focused on the east side of the town, first bombarding it with cannon shot, and then storming the earthen redoubt that Blake had established. After some early success in which they captured one of the earthen forts, the attackers were forced back by a combination of musket shot, stones and boiling water. The next day, after yet more attacks made little impact, Hopton staged a battle on the south side of the town between two parties of his own army in an attempt to make Blake believe the Parliamentarian army had arrived. Hopton hoped that Blake would send out some of his own men to support the relieving force, but the feint failed. That evening, at around 7 pm, the Royalist force, which consisted of around 4,200 infantry and 2,000 cavalry, launched an all-out assault against the town. In heavy fighting, the attackers captured two of the earthen forts on the eastern side of town, and broke through the defences. Once inside Blake's outer perimeter, the besieging army discovered that there were Parliamentarian musketeers within every house, which prevented them advancing any further, though they did set fire to buildings, hoping to force the defenders to retreat. The tactic failed when the wind blew the flames back towards the Royalists, halting their attack.

The attack was renewed around 11 am on 9 May, and over the next seven hours, Hopton's army advanced slowly through the town. His forces pushed the Parliamentarian troops back one building at a time, until they were left with only a small area of land in the middle of the town. Within the perimeter was the castle, an entrenchment in the market square, St Mary Magdalene Church and an earthen defence known as "Maiden's fort". By this time, a combination of artillery and arson attacks had set most of the east side of town on fire. An attempt by three people—two men and a woman—to set fires inside the remaining defences was quashed, and the culprits lynched.

Further assaults were made on 10 May, along with a demand for Blake and his men to surrender, to which Blake responded that he "had four pairs of boots left and would eat three of them before he yielded." Weldon's relieving force had met with small parties of the Royalist army around Chard and Pitminster, and they sent an advance party ahead of them, which reached Orchard Portman, roughly 2 miles (3.2 km) south of Taunton, on 10 May. Fearing that they were facing the entirety of Fairfax's army, Hopton ordered his forces to abandon their attacks and retreat to Bridgwater. As they left, they felled trees across roads to slow the Parliamentarian advance. Weldon's army arrived in Taunton on 11 May, relieving and restocking the town. Accounts of Taunton's losses vary between 50 and 200 killed, with 200 or more casualties on top of that, while two thirds of the houses in the town had been razed. Having relieved Taunton, Weldon and his army left the following day and marched eastwards.

=== Third siege ===
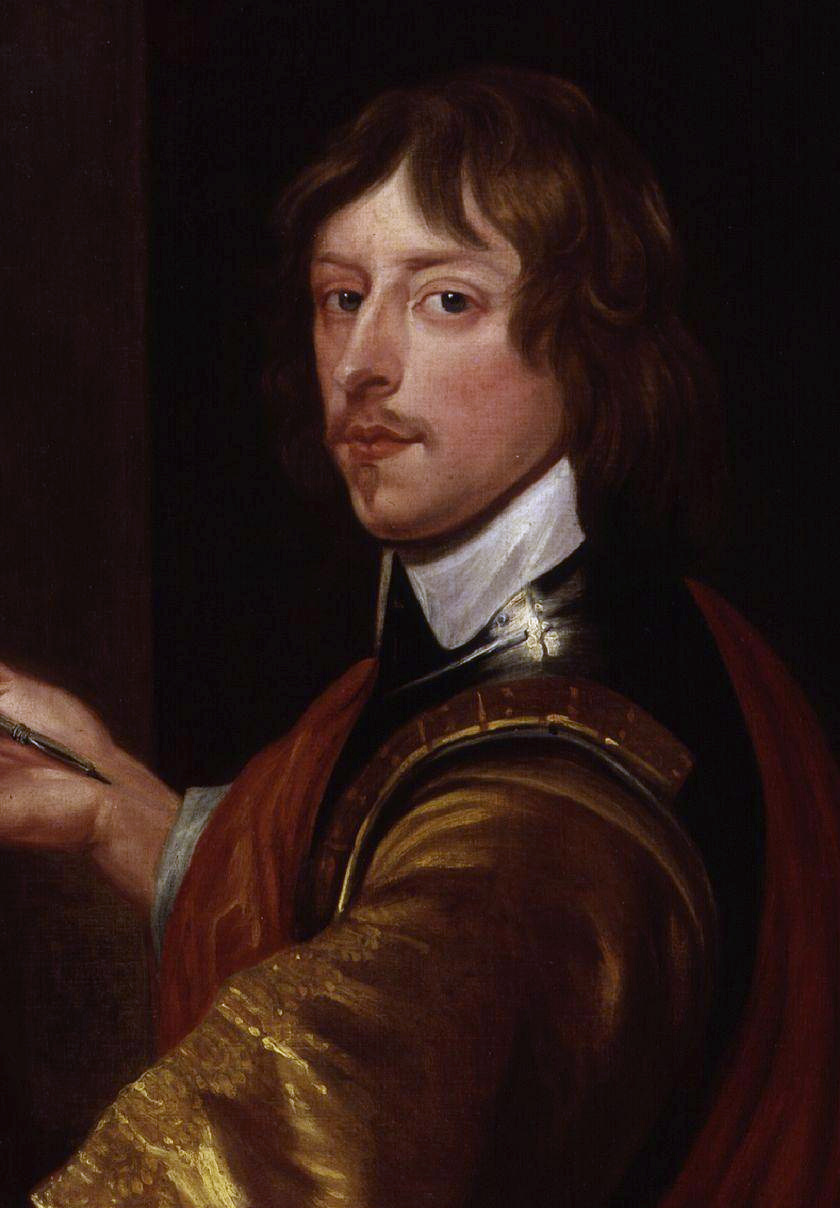
George Goring, Lord Goring renewed the Royalist siege in 1645.

Over the course of the siege, Lord Goring had been with the King in Oxford, and on 10 May he returned to Bristol with a royal warrant pronouncing him the Commander of the Royalist Army in the West Country, replacing Hopton. Goring began his operations by harrying Weldon's army, and forcing them to retreat back to Taunton. Goring, commanding about 10,000 men, established a third siege of the town in under a year. He ignored orders from the King for him to support the Royalist efforts in the Midlands, claiming that "Taunton would be taken in a few days." Despite his promises, he soon discovered that his army was too small to enact a rapid takeover of the town, and he established a loose blockade. Hyde, who is frequently scathing of Goring in his description of the Civil War, recalls that "Goring was so far from making any advance upon Taunton, that he grew much more negligent in it than he had been; suffered provisions, in great quantities, to be carried into the town." As well as being lax in his siege, Goring was often drunk and—reminiscent of the earlier siege—was deserted by many of his troops.

The regional commander of the Parliamentarian forces, Colonel Edward Massey, was ordered to relieve Taunton in June, but he could only raise 3,000 men; far less than was needed to dispel Goring's army. The New Model Army, with Fairfax at their head, were busy in the Midlands defeating the bulk of the Royalist army at the Battle of Naseby, described by modern sources as "the decisive clash of the English Civil War". Goring had been ordered by the King to abandon his siege and join the Royalist forces at Naseby, and it has been suggested by modern historians that with his forces, and his leadership, the Royalists might have won the battle. Immediately after securing that victory, Fairfax led his army down towards Taunton once again. Aware of the approaching army, Lord Goring mounted a final assault on the town, hoping to catch Blake unaware by sending his cavalry towards the town on 9 July. The attack was neutralised by a section of Fairfax's army in Ilminster, and Goring withdrew from Taunton to meet Fairfax at the Battle of Langport, relieving the third and final siege of Taunton during the English Civil War.

== Aftermath ==
In his history of Taunton, H. J. Wickenden suggests that over half of the town was burned or destroyed during the three sieges, while Diane Purkiss claims that it was as high as two thirds of the town. Several compensation payouts were made to the town and some of its residents, funded by fines against those who had fought for the Royalists, such as Sir William Portman, who had been the Member of Parliament for Taunton at the outbreak of the war and was fined £7,000. Although the Parliamentarians destroyed many of the castles that had featured in the Civil War, Taunton Castle was considered a Parliamentarian stronghold, and remained intact. In 1647, only two years after the end of the sieges, the castle was sold as part of the estate of Taunton Manor. In 1660, shortly after taking the throne, Charles II stripped Taunton of its town charter for its part in the Civil War, and had the castle's outer walls removed.

After commanding the defence of Taunton, Blake was ordered to capture Dunster Castle, which he achieved after a nine-month siege. After the war, he was honoured by Parliament for his efforts and rewarded with £500, while a further £2,000 was split amongst his men. He took no side during the Second Civil War and, three years later, under the Commonwealth of England, he became a general at sea, as one of the three commissioners of the navy, and spent the rest of his life as a naval commander, for which he remains best known.

== Bibliography ==
- Barratt, John (2004). Cavalier Generals: King Charles I and His Commanders in the English Civil War 1642–46. Barnsley: Pen & Sword Military. ISBN 978-1-84415-128-8.
- Bush, Robin (1977). The Book of Taunton. Chesham: Barracuda Books. ISBN 978-0-86023-034-2.
- Ellison, Gerald (1936). The Sieges of Taunton in 1644–5. Taunton: Somerset County Herald. OCLC 852019005.
- Granville, Roger (1908). The King's General in the West: The Life of Sir Richard Granville, Bart., 1600–1659. London: J. Lane. OCLC 921472.
- Hopper, Andrew (2012). Turncoats and Renegadoes: Changing Sides during the English Civil Wars. Oxford: Oxford University Press. ISBN 978-0-19-957585-5.
- Hibbert, Christopher (1993). Cavaliers and Roundheads: The English at War 1642–1649. London: HarperCollins. ISBN 978-0-246-13632-9.
- Hyde, Edward (1816). The History of the Rebellion and Civil Wars in England. Vol. 2. Oxford: Clarendon Press. OCLC 1431493.
- Memegalos, Florene S. (2007). George Goring (1608–1657): Caroline Courtier and Royalist General. Aldershot: Ashgate Publishing. ISBN 978-0-7546-5299-1.
- Minnitt, S. C. (1981). May, F. (ed.). "Civil war coin hoard". The Proceedings of the Somersetshire Archaeological and Natural History Society. 125. Bridgwater: Bigwood & Staple. OCLC 852133420.
- Morris, Robert (1995). The Sieges of Taunton 1644–1645. Bristol: Stuart Press. ISBN 978-1-85804-057-8.
- Purkiss, Diane (2006). The English Civil War: A People's History. London: HarperPress. ISBN 978-0-00-715061-8.
- Stewart, William (2009). Admirals of the World: A Biographical Dictionary, 1500 to the Present. Jefferson, North Carolina: McFarland & Company. ISBN 978-0-7864-3809-9.
- Toulmin, Joshua; Savage, James (1822). The History of Taunton, in the County of Somerset. Taunton: John Poole & James Savage. OCLC 751836236.
- Venning, Timothy (2015). An Alternative History of Britain: The English Civil War. Barnsley: Pen & Sword Military. ISBN 978-1-4738-2782-0.
- Wickenden, H. J. (1947) [1938]. The History of Taunton. Taunton: E. Goodman and Son. OCLC 852018781.
