= Blue scrotum sign of Bryant =

Sign of abdominal aortic aneurysm

- Symptoms: Bruising of the scrotum
- Causes: Ruptured abdominal aortic aneurysm
- Named after: John Henry Bryant

The blue scrotum sign of Bryant, also known as Bryant's blue sign, is bruising of the scrotum, typically associated with a ruptured abdominal aortic aneurysm (AAA). It generally appears three or four days after first experiencing pain, though may occur hours after and sometimes weeks after the rupture.

The sign is named after British physician John Henry Bryant, who first described it in 1903.

== Definition ==
Blue scrotum sign of Bryant is a medical sign associated with a ruptured abdominal aortic aneurysm (AAA) that is leaking relatively slowly.

== Signs and symptoms ==
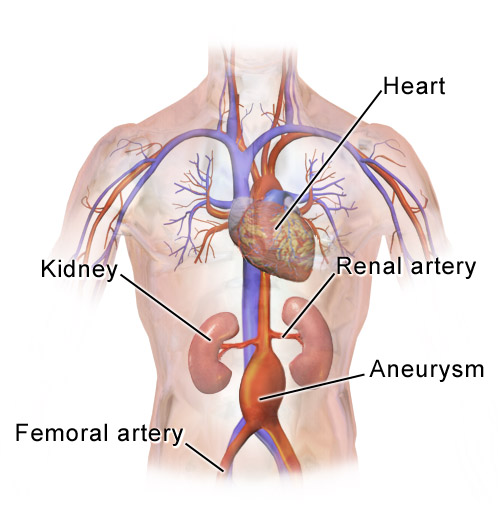
Abdominal aortic aneurysm location

Bruising of one side or both sides of the scrotum may be seen three or four days after leakage of the aneurysm.

== Cause and mechanism ==
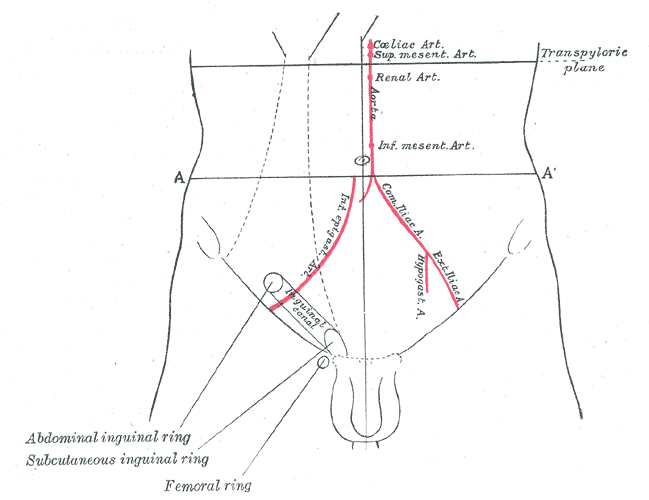
Inguinal canal

Rupture of the aneurysm causes blood to accumulate in the retroperitoneal space and extravasate into the scrotal tissue via the inguinal canal and spermatic cord.

== Epidemiology ==
The sign is uncommon.

== History ==
The sign was first described in 1903 by John Henry Bryant (1867–1906) in autopsies conducted on people who died from ruptured AAA.
