= John Henry Bryant (British physician) =

British physician (1867–1906)

- Born: 1867; Ilminster, South Somerset, England
- Died: 21 May 1906 (aged 38–39); Walmer, Kent, England
- Occupation: Pathologist
- Known for: Blue scrotum sign of Bryant
- Medical career
- Institutions: Guy's Hospital

John Henry Bryant (1867 – 21 May 1906) was an English physician, and lecturer on materia medica and therapeutics at Guy's Hospital, London. The blue scrotum sign of Bryant is named after him. In 1903 he had given the first description of abdominal and scrotal bruising in a person with a ruptured abdominal aortic aneurysm.

== Early life and education ==
John Bryant was born in 1867 in Ilminster, South Somerset, the eldest son of William Mead Bryant. He attended Ilminster Grammar School, followed by Sherborne School. In 1886 he gained admission to Guy's Hospital, where he received his medical degree and the Treasurer's gold medals for medicine and surgery in 1890. He also received the Beaney prize.

== Career ==
In 1891 Bryant gained his M.D., and in 1895 his M.R.C.P. He became house-physician to James Goodhart and resident obstetric assistant. In 1892, he was elected medical registrar, and remained in that post until 1898, when he took up the position of assistant physician to Guy's. The following year he became demonstrator of morbid anatomy and lecturer on materia medica and therapeutics. He was elected a fellow of the Royal College of Physicians in 1901. For some years he co-edited the Guy's Hospital Reports.

In 1903 Bryant had given the first description of abdominal and scrotal bruising in a person with a ruptured abdominal aortic aneurysm.

== Personal and family ==
Bryant played rugby at county standard and was a fast runner. He married Stella Beatrice Fry, and they had three children; one son and two daughters.

== Death and legacy ==
Bryant died on 21 May 1906 at Walmer, Kent. The blue scrotum sign of Bryant is named after him.

== Selected publications ==
- Bryant, J.H (November 1900). "Two cases of acute hemorrhagic pancreatitis". The Lancet. 156 (4028): 1341–1345. doi:10.1016/S0140-6736(01)80042-8.
- Bryant, J. H. (1901). "Pneumococcus Peritonitis". The British Medical Journal. 2 (2125): 767–771. ISSN 0007-1447. JSTOR 20269592.
- Bryant, J.H (February 1903). "The value of blood examination as an aid to diagnosis and prognosis". The Lancet. 161 (4145): 360–364. doi:10.1016/S0140-6736(00)66106-8.
- Bryant, JH (1903). "Two clinical lectures on aneurysm of the abdominal aorta. Lecture 1". The Clinical Journal. 23. The Medical Publishing Company, 22 1/2 Bartholomew Close, London: 71–80.
