= Charles Moore (geologist) =

British geologist (1815–1881)

Charles Moore (8 June 1815 – 8 December 1881) was a British geologist.

== Life ==
Charles was the third child (second son) of John Moore and his wife Sophia (née Eames) and was born at Ilminster, Somerset, on 8 June 1815. He attended the commercial school in Ilminster from an early age until 1827, when he was removed to the free grammar school for one year. He then assisted his father in carrying on the business of printer and bookseller; also his uncle, Samuel Moore, who conducted a similar business at Castle Cary.

About 1837, Moore appears to have gone to Bath, where he worked for Mr William Meyler, bookseller, at the Grand Pump Room Library in the Abbey Churchyard, adjoining the Grand Pump Room. On his father's death in 1844 he returned to Ilminster and continued the family business, with his eldest sister for a partner, until 1853, when he returned to Bath and, relinquishing trade, devoted himself to his favourite pursuit of geology, and also to municipal affairs. He was elected a Councillor for the Lyncombe and Widcombe ward on 1 September 1868, and Alderman on 11 November 1874. He died at Bath on 8 December 1881. His wife Eliza, whom he married in 1853, was the only daughter of Mr. Deare of Widcombe.

Moore's attention was first directed to geology by his accidental discovery, when a boy, of a fossil fish in a nodule; from that time he became an ardent collector, and before his second removal to Bath he had laid the foundation of the collection which, arranged by his own hands, now forms the ‘Geological Museum’ of the Bath Royal Literary and Scientific Institution. He was elected a Fellow of the Geological Society in 1854. In 1864 he announced at the meeting of the British Association in Bath his important discovery of the existence in England of the Rhætic Beds, which had previously been overlooked. From these beds Moore obtained at the same time twenty-nine teeth of one of the oldest known mammals ('Microlestes moorei', Owen).

Moore was the author of some thirty papers on geological subjects contributed to the Quarterly Journal of the Geological Society, the Geological Magazine, the Reports of the British Association, the Transactions of the Bath Royal Literary and Scientific Association, &c.

== Sources ==
Charles Moore, by the Rev. H. H. Winwood, in Proceedings of the Bath Natural History Society (1892) vii. 232–269; information kindly supplied by the same authority; Geol. Mag. 1882, p. 94.
