= Chard and Ilminster News =

Local newspaper in Somerset, England

Chard & Ilminster News
- Type: Weekly newspaper
- Owner(s): Newsquest
- Founded: 1874
- Circulation: 1,461 (as of 2023)
- Website: chardandilminsternews.co.uk

The Chard and Ilminster News is a local newspaper in Somerset, England.

== History ==
The newspaper was established in Chard, Somerset, about 1874, as a weekly newspaper published on Saturdays, priced at one penny, and in 1882 was identified as Liberal-supporting, with a circulation of one thousand copies. It was then in competition with the longer-established Nowlen's Weekly Chronicle, Chard, Ilminster, and Axminster Gazette, which was Conservative and was selling 850 copies at a higher price.

== Present day ==
The newspaper continues to be published weekly in Chard and covers the local news, events, jobs, births, deaths and marriages of Chard, Ilminster, Crewkerne, and the villages of South Somerset.
