= Arthur Duck =

English lawyer, author and Member of Parliament

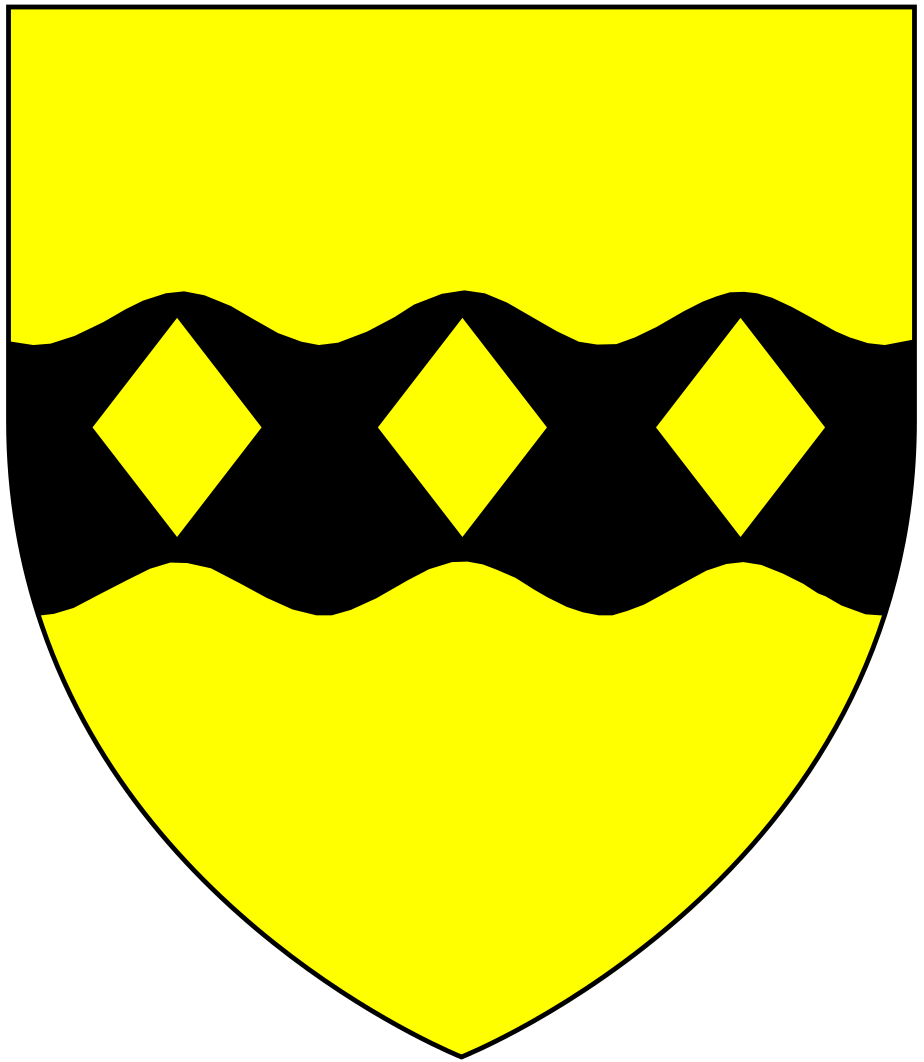
Arms of Duck: Or, on a fess wavy sable three lozenges of the field

Arthur Duck (1580 – 16 December 1648), Doctor of Civil Law (LL.D.) was an English lawyer, author and Member of Parliament.

== Origins ==
Duck was born at Heavitree, near Exeter, Devon. the younger son of Richard Duck and his wife Joanna. His elder brother was the lawyer Nicholas Duck (1570-1628).

Duck was educated at Exeter College, Oxford (B.A., 1599) and Hart Hall, Oxford (M.A., 1602), and was elected a fellow of All Souls in 1604. In 1612 he was made a Doctor of Laws (LL.D.), and in 1614 was admitted as an Advocate of Doctor's Commons. As a jurist Duck was a pupil of John Budden.

== Career ==
In 1624, Duck became a Member of Parliament for Minehead, Somerset. and again in the Short Parliament of 1640.

Duck was associated with the future Archbishop Laud for some years. Duck wrote an opinion that a statute drafted by Laud for Wadham College, Oxford, was not ultra vires is mentioned in the Calendar of State Papers in 1625–6. Duck became Chancellor of the Diocese of London at about the time Laud was translated to the bishopric in 1628; by 1633 Duck is recorded as pleading a case for Laud before the King and Council on appeal from the Dean of Arches. Also in 1633, he was placed on the Ecclesiastical Commission. Duck later became Chancellor of Bath and Wells in 1635, and held numerous other ecclesiastical and administrative posts. In 1639 he prosecuted a case against a false display of heraldry at a funeral of a wealth benefactor of Christ's Hospital.

In 1641, Duck unsuccessfully contested the appointment of Sir William Meyrick as judge of the prerogative court of Canterbury. He was appointed a Master of Requests by Charles I at Oxford in 1643 and Master in Chancery in 1645. In 1648 Charles I, then a prisoner of Parliament, requested that Parliament allow him Duck's help in negotiating a settlement to the Civil War. It is not known if Parliament granted this request.

Duck acquired the prebendal manor of Chiswick in Middlesex, held under a lease from St Paul's Cathedral in London. The Dictionary of National Biography records that Duck died in Chelsea in December 1648, and was buried at Chiswick in May 1649. However, Foss lists him as still a Master of Chancery from 1649 to 1650.

== Literary works ==
Duck wrote the following works:

- Vita Henrici Chichele archiepiscopi Cantuariensis sub regibus Henrico V et VI, Oxford, 1617. A life of Henry Chichele, it was reprinted, ed. William Bates, in Vitæ Selectorum aliquot Virorum, London, 1681, and was translated anonymously London, 1699. It used an earlier life by Roger Hovenden.
- De Usu et Authoritate Juris Civilis Romanorum, London, 1653 (assisted by Gerard Langbaine the Elder). It was translated in part by John Beaver in 1724 as On the Use and Authority of the Civil Law in the Kingdom of England and bound in the same volume with the translation of Claude Joseph de Ferrière's History of the Roman Law, London. It gives detailed information on the reception of Roman law in different European countries.

According to one commentator, the Chichele biography was anti-papalist and negative about the foundations of canon law. The De Usu took a line on the "ancient constitution" that was hostile to royal authority. It raised the general historical question of how law had evolved differently in different states. Pietro Giannone considered this point in relation to the Kingdom of Naples and Kingdom of Sicily.

== Marriage and children ==
Duck was married at Cathedral Church of Saint Andrew by Bishop Lake to Margaret Southworth, daughter of Henry Southworth, merchant, of London and Wells. The couple had two daughters, according to the biographer John Prince, (1643–1723):

- Martha Duck, who married (1) William Duck, (2) Nicholas Duck (1630–1667), of Mount Radford, Exeter, her first cousin once removed, and (3) Sir Thomas Carew, 1st Baronet, of Haccombe;
- Mary Duck, who married William Harbord, MP, of Grafton Park, Northamptonshire.

== Notes ==
Parliament of England
Preceded by Francis Pearce; Sir Robert Lloyd	Member of Parliament for Minehead; 1624–1625; With: Sir Arthur Lake	Succeeded by Thomas Luttrell; Charles Pyne
Preceded by Sir Francis Wyndham; Alexander Popham	Member of Parliament for Minehead; 1640; With: Sir Francis Wyndham	Succeeded by Alexander Luttrell; Sir Francis Popham

Attribution

This article incorporates text from a publication now in the public domain: "Duck, Arthur". Dictionary of National Biography. London: Smith, Elder & Co. 1885–1900.
