= Ilminster =

Market town in Somerset, England

Coordinates: 50.9262°N 2.9114°W

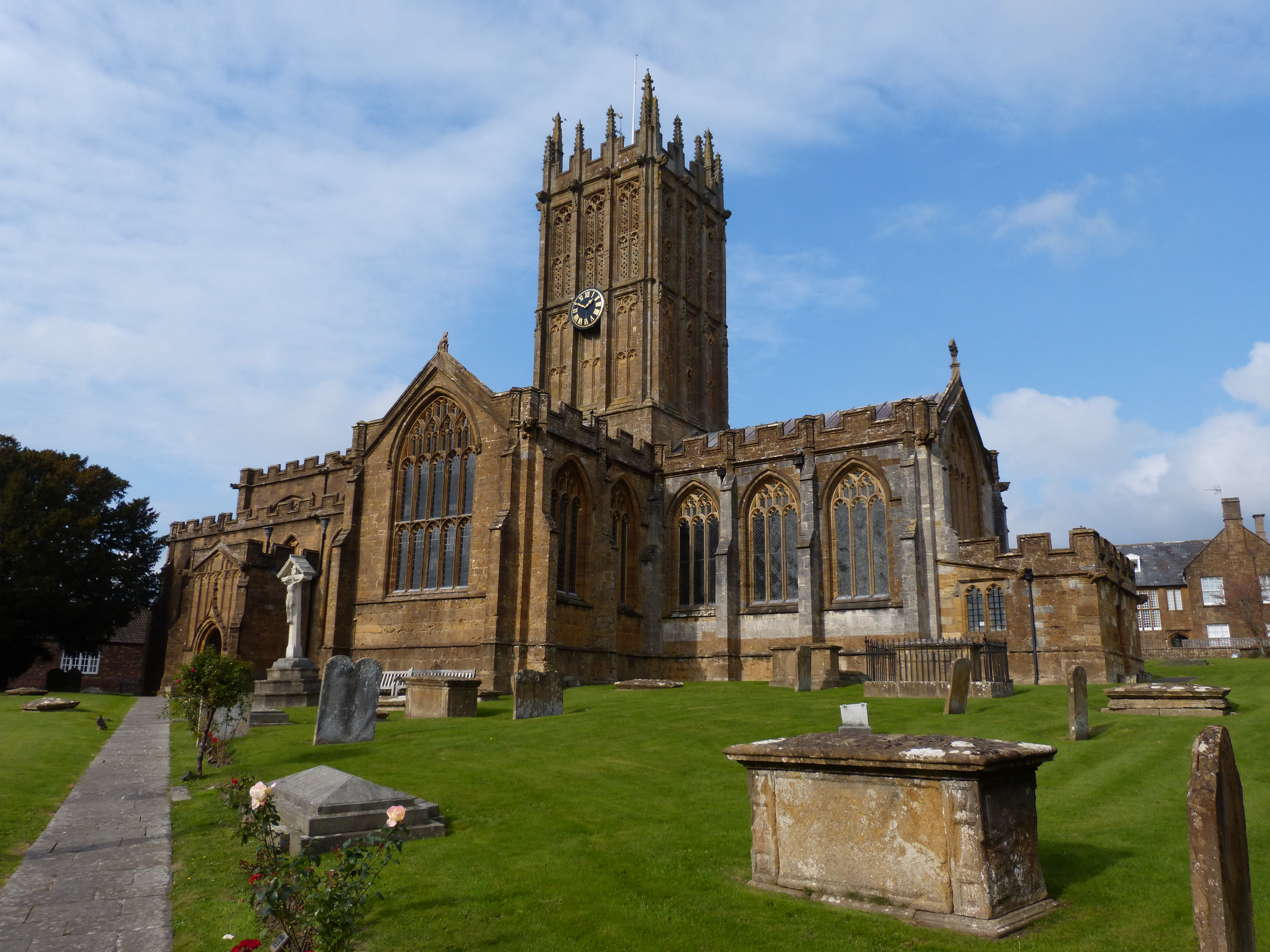
- Ilminster's Minster Church

- Location within Somerset
- Population: 5,964 (Parish, 2021)
- OS grid reference: ST359145
- Unitary authority: Somerset Council
- Ceremonial county: Somerset
- Region: South West
- Country: England
- Sovereign state: United Kingdom
- Post town: ILMINSTER
- Postcode district: TA19
- Dialling code: 01460
- Police: Avon and Somerset
- Fire: Devon and Somerset
- Ambulance: South Western
- UK Parliament: Yeovil

Ilminster is a market town and civil parish in Somerset, England. It lies just east of the junction of the A303 (London to Exeter) and the A358 (Taunton to Chard and Axminster). The parish includes the hamlet of Sea. At the 2021 census, the parish had a population of 5,964.

== History ==
Ilminster is mentioned in documents dating from 725 and in a charter granted to Muchelney Abbey (10 miles (16 km) to the north) by Æthelred the Unready in 995. Ilminster is also mentioned in the Domesday Book of 1086 as ‘Ileminstre’, meaning 'The church on the River Isle' from the Old English ysle and mynster. By this period Ilminster was a flourishing community and was granted the right to hold a weekly market, which it still does.

In 1645 during the English Civil War Ilminster was the scene of a skirmish between parliamentary troops under Edward Massie and Royalist forces under Lord Goring, who fought for control of the bridges prior to the Battle of Langport.

The town contains the buildings of a sixteenth-century grammar school, the Ilminster Meeting House, which acts as the town's art gallery and concert hall. There is also a Gospel Hall.

Canal Way in the town refers to the long abandoned and never completed Chard Canal which connected the town to the River Parrett.

== Governance ==
There are two tiers of local government covering Ilminster, at parish (town) and unitary authority level: Ilminster Town Council and Somerset Council. The town council is based at the Old Magistrates Court on East Street in the town centre.

For parliamentary elections, Ilminster is part of the Yeovil constituency.

=== Administrative history ===
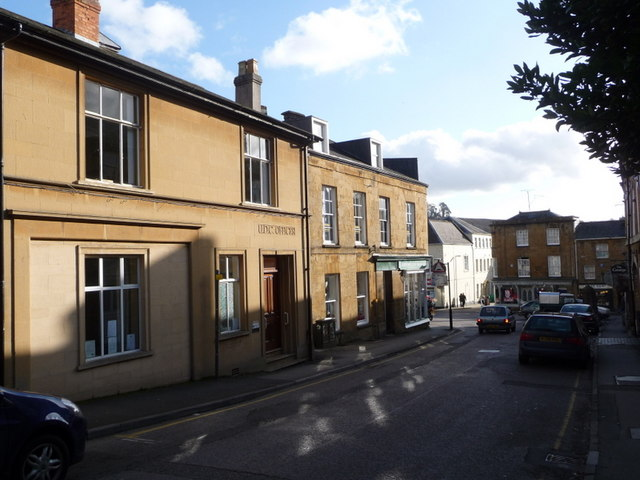
Former Urban District / Town Council offices on North Street

Ilminster was an ancient parish in the Abdick and Bulstone hundred of Somerset. As well as the town itself, the parish also covered surrounding rural areas, including Ashwell, Horton and Peasmarsh. When elected parish and district councils were created in 1894, Ilminster was given a parish council and included in the Chard Rural District. In 1899, an urban district was created just covering the part of the parish around the town itself.

As part of the 1899 reforms, the more rural remainder of the old parish outside the urban district was made a separate civil parish called Ilminster Without. The Ilminster Without parish was abolished in 1982. Some became a new parish of Horton, and the remainder was split between neighbouring parishes.

Ilminster Urban District Council built itself a headquarters at 4 North Street in 1935. The urban district was abolished in 1974 under the Local Government Act 1972, with its area becoming part of the new Yeovil district. The Yeovil district was renamed South Somerset in 1985. A successor parish was created covering the former urban district as part of the 1974 reforms, with its parish council taking the name Ilminster Town Council.

The town council continued to be based at 4 North Street until 2022 when it moved to the former magistrates' court on East Street.

South Somerset was abolished in 2023. Somerset County Council then took over district-level functions across its area, making it a unitary authority, and was renamed Somerset Council.

== Geography ==
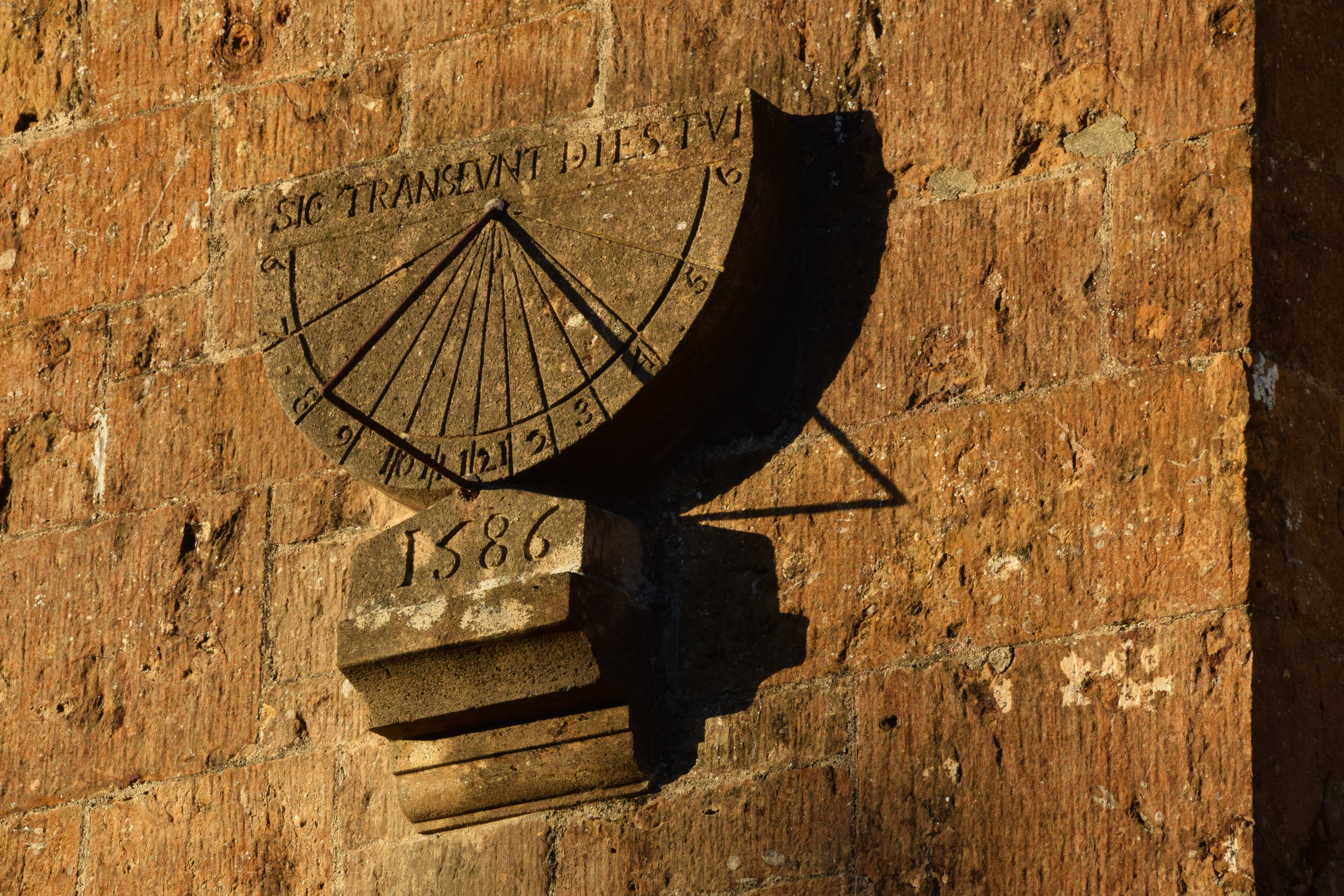
Sundial on the former Ilminster Grammar School building, dated 1586

Ilminster is close to the River Isle and the A303 road.

=== Climate ===
Along with the rest of South West England, Ilminster has a temperate climate which is generally wetter and milder than the rest of the country. The annual mean temperature is approximately 10 °C (50.0 °F). Seasonal temperature variation is less extreme than most of the United Kingdom because of the adjacent sea temperatures.

The summer months of July and August are the warmest with mean daily maxima of approximately 21 °C (69.8 °F). In winter mean minimum temperatures of 1 °C (33.8 °F) or 2 °C (35.6 °F) are common. In the summer the Azores high pressure affects the south-west of England, however convective cloud sometimes forms inland, reducing the number of hours of sunshine.

Annual sunshine rates are slightly less than the regional average of 1,600 hours. In December 1998 there were 20 days without sun recorded at Yeovilton. Most of the rainfall in the south-west is caused by Atlantic depressions or by convection. Most of the rainfall in autumn and winter is caused by the Atlantic depressions, which is when they are most active. In summer, a large proportion of the rainfall is caused by sun heating the ground leading to convection and to showers and thunderstorms. Average rainfall is around 700 mm (28 in). About 8–15 days of snowfall is typical. November to March have the highest mean wind speeds, and June to August have the lightest winds. The predominant wind direction is from the south-west.

== Church ==
Ilminster takes its name from the River Isle and its large church of St Mary, which is known as The Minster. The Hamstone building dates from the 15th century, but was refurbished in 1825 by William Burgess and the chancel restored in 1883. Further restoration took place in 1887-89 and 1902. Among the principal features are the Wadham tombs; those of Sir William Wadham and his mother, dated 1452 and Nicholas and Dorothy Wadham 1609 and 1618.

The tower rises two storeys above the nave. It has three bays, with a stair turret to the north-west corner. The bays are articulated by slender buttresses with crocketed finials above the castellated parapet. Each bay on both stages contains a tall two-light mullioned-and-transomed window with tracery. The lights to the top are filled with pierced stonework; those to the base are solid. The stair turret has string courses coinciding with those on the tower, and a spirelet with a weathervane. It contains a bell dating from 1732 made by Thomas Bilbie and another from 1790 made by William Bilbie of the Bilbie family. The church has been designated by English Heritage as a Grade I listed building.

== Commerce ==
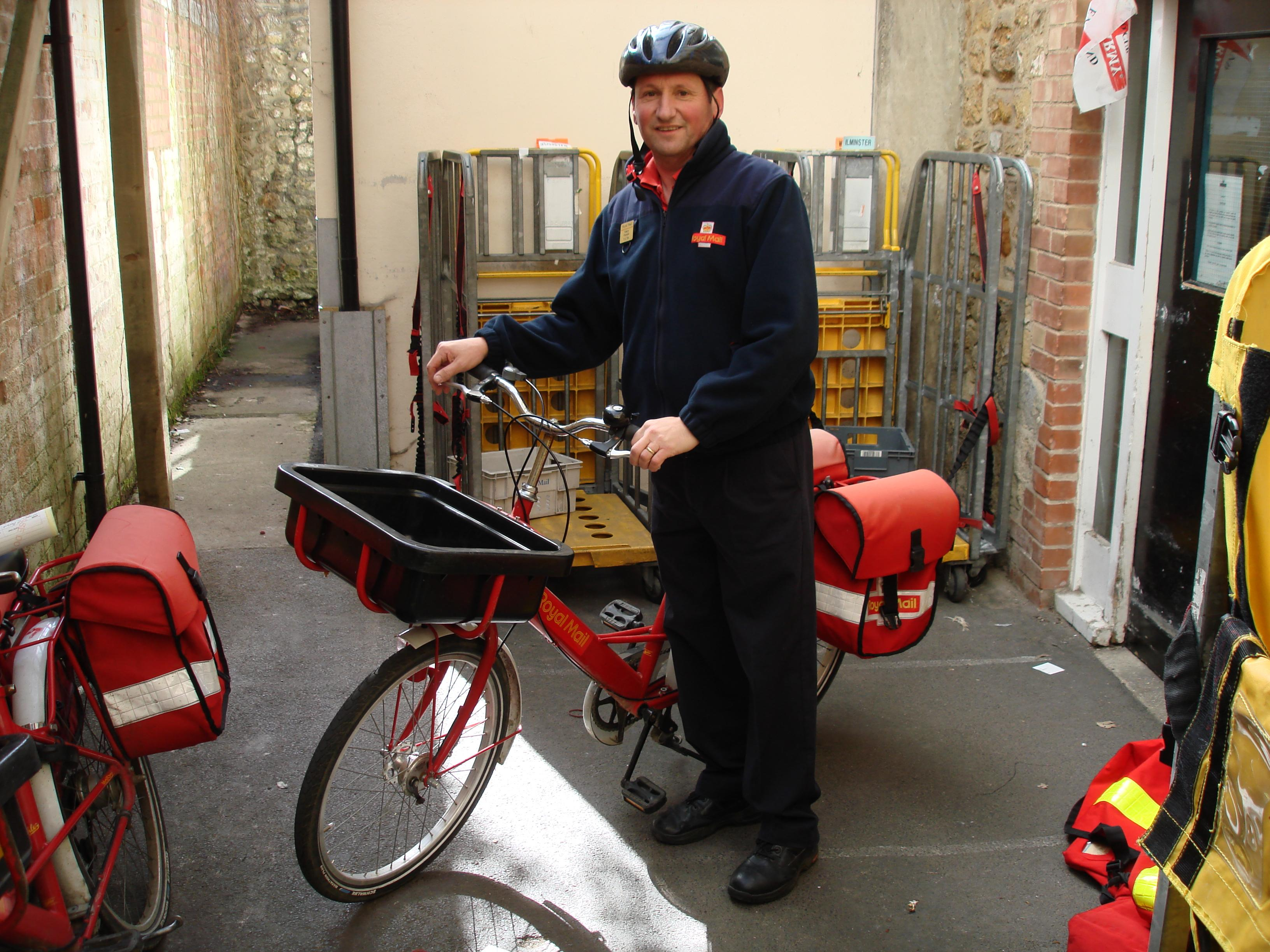
Bicycle messenger of Royal mail in Ilminster

The town has a selection of shops including antique shops, home design, estate agents, hairdressers and several cafes and restaurants, many reminiscent of the style of earlier Edwardian and Victorian years.

In November the town celebrates the lighting of the Christmas lights with a Victorian evening. In earlier days celebrations were normally accompanied by the staff of local shops dressing in Victorian costume and serving rum and cakes and other refreshments. Participation by shops offering hospitality in these days is now much reduced although there is still a convivial atmosphere while visitors are enjoying their shopping.

== Culture ==
Ilminster MidSummer Experience

Every year the three-day town festival, the Ilminster MidSummer Experience (IMEx), takes place on the second weekend in June. It is a community festival open free to all, organised by Experience Ilminster CIC, and includes many events and activities by local groups including the Ilminster Classic Vehicle Show, the Family Dog Show and the Ilminster Town Council Scarecrow Competition. A Food & Craft Street Market takes place on the Saturday in the town's main street together with a Suitcase Market in the Market House.

The Flag Festival forms a major part of the Ilminster Midsummer Experience. The town’s medieval road layout, which hugs closely to the 15th century Minster church, dramatically emphasises the effect of the more than 110 flags, flying from each of the town centre business premises, bringing vibrancy and colour to the town.

The Flag Festival grew out of an idea from one of the town’s artists from which a flag-maker was commissioned to work with children from Herne View Primary School (formerly Greenfylde School) to design the original 20 flags.

The 'Ilminster Literary Festival', launched in 2016, has become and established annual celebration which is usually held in early Summer.

Victorian Evening at the Christmas FestivaL..the festive Victorian Evening and switch-on of the Christmas Lights in November is part of the Ilminster Christmas Festival, organised by the Ilminster Chamber of Commerce.. The Evening includes the switching on of the Christmas Lights in Ilminster’s town centre, with shops and stalls staying open throughout the evening to offer goodwill and good cheer to all, with the staff of many shops dressed up as Victorians and offering mulled wine and eats.

The Ilminster Town Crier competition and Britain's Disabled Strongman events also take place every year, supported by Experience Ilminster CIC, with the Town Crier Event also hosting the Wessex Championship Cup covering six counties of the west of England.

The Warehouse Theatre puts on several stage performances every year and throughout the year and the Ilminster Arts Centre provides music, art exhibitions and arts and crafts events together with a crafts shop.

Dillington House, at the entrance to Ilminster from the east, is an arts venue with accommodation managed by Somerset County Council. It dates to the sixteenth century, was the home of Prime Minister Lord North and is rated Grade 2* by English Heritage.

== Media ==
Television signals are received from either the Mendip or Stockland Hill TV transmitters.

Local radio stations are BBC Radio Somerset on 95.5 FM, Heart West on 97.1 FM, Greatest Hits Radio South West (formerly The Breeze) on 106.6 FM and Radio Ninesprings, a community based station which broadcast to the town on 104.6 FM.

The town is served by the local newspapers, Chard and Ilminster News, Somerset County Gazette, Somerset Guardian and Standard and Somerset Live.

== Transport ==
=== Rail ===
Ilminster railway station on the Chard Branch Line closed in 1962. There were also some sidings, to allow trains going in opposite directions to pass each other. The nearest running railway station is located at Crewkerne.

=== Buses & Coaches ===
There are multiple bus services that run through the town, including Buses of Somerset and an express service to London operated by Berrys Coaches.

=== Roads ===
Ilminster lies just east of the junction of the A303 (London to Exeter) and the A358 (Taunton to Chard and Axminster). The B3168 runs through the middle of the town. There have been concerns of the safety of roads in Ilminster, however schemes were announced by Somerset County Council in 2014 to make local roads safer for pedestrians and drivers.

=== Cycling ===
Ilminster is linked to Chard via the Chard to Ilminster Cycle Path which runs along a purpose-built traffic-free railway path, which was also part of the Taunton Stop Line. The path is part of Route 33 of the National Cycle Network which runs from Bristol to Seaton

== Twinnings ==
Ilminster is twinned with Riec-sur-Belon in France.

== Notable people ==
See also Category:People from Ilminster

- John Edward Taylor (1791–1844), business tycoon, editor, publisher and founder of the Manchester Guardian newspaper in 1821.
- John Baker (1813–1872), emigrated to Australia and became the Premier of South Australia.
- Charles Moore (1815–1881), a geologist, elected a Fellow of the Geological Society in 1854.
- John Henry Bryant (1867–1906), physician, and lecturer on materia medica and therapeutics at Guy's Hospital, London.
- C. H. Collins Baker (1880–1959), art historian and painter.
- Lieutenant-General Sir Colin Callander (1897–1979), a senior Army officer and Military Secretary from 1954 to 1957.
- Len Bond (born 1954), football goalkeeper who played over 370 games, including 138 for Exeter City.
