= Sir Francis Wyndham, 1st Baronet =

English soldier and politician

Sir Francis Wyndham MP, JP
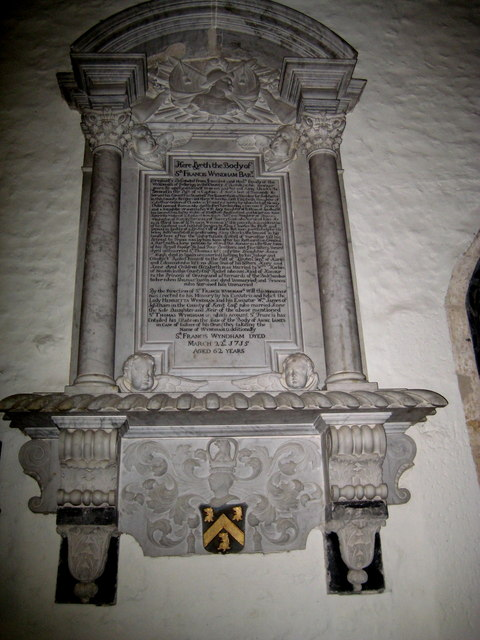
- Wyndham Memorial c. 1715, St Andrews Trent, Dorset

MP for Milborne Port
- In office April 1661 – July 1676 †

Deputy Lieutenant of Somerset
- In office 1666 – 1676 †

Royalist Governor of Dunster Castle
- In office June 1643 – April 1646

MP for Minehead
- In office 1640 – Suspended 1642

Personal details
- Born: circa 1610 Kentsford House, (Note: Kentsford Farm lies in a valley beside the Washford river on the extreme western edge of the parish. It is of two storeys with attics on an irregular L-shaped plan. The west wing, facing the river, may retain the plan of a late medieval house. It appears to have been largely rebuilt c. 1600 when it became the cross wing to a hall range running eastwards and entered by opposing doorways with a porch on the south. Further alterations seem to have taken place in the late 17th century when a kitchen fireplace was put into the south room of the cross wing, and the room beyond the entrance passage was made into a parlour.) Somerset
- Died: 15 July 1676 (aged 66) Trent Manor House, Dorset
- Resting place: St Andrews, Trent
- Spouse: Anne Gerard (died 1653)
- Relations: Edmund Wyndham
- Children: Three sons, three daughters
- Parent(s): Sir Thomas Wyndham (1570-1631), Elizabeth Coningsby (died 1635)
- Education: University of Padua
- Occupation: Landowner

Military service
- Allegiance: Royalist
- Years of service: 1642 to 1646
- Rank: Colonel
- Battles/wars: First English Civil War

Sir Francis Wyndham, 1st Baronet (c. 1612 – 15 July 1676) of Trent, Dorset was an English soldier and politician who sat in the House of Commons of England at various times from 1640 until his death in 1676. During the First English Civil War, he served as a colonel in the Royalist army and helped Charles II of England escape to France after his defeat in the 1651 Third English Civil War.

== Biography ==
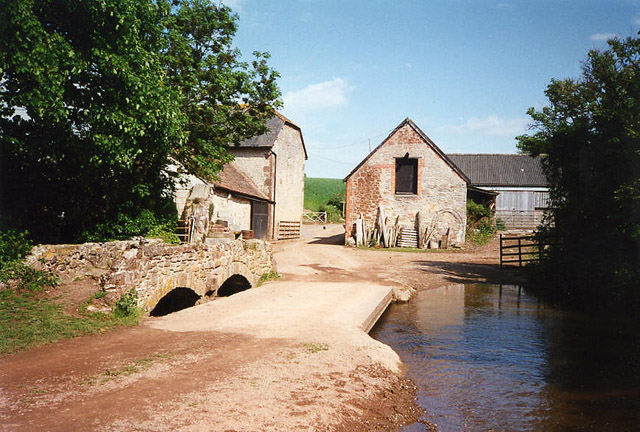
Remains of Kentsford House, where Francis was born circa 1610

Francis Wyndham was born around 1610, fifth surviving son of Sir Thomas Wyndham (1570-1631), and his wife Elizabeth Coningsby (died 1635). His father came from the Kentsford Wyndhams, a cadet branch of the Orchard Wyndhams, a numerous and powerful grouping within the Somerset gentry. He was one of five sons, including Edmund Wyndham (1600-1681); three of his brothers were killed during the 1638 to 1651 Wars of the Three Kingdoms.

In 1646, he married Anne Gerard, daughter and heir of Thomas Gerard (1593-1634), owner of Trent, Dorset, then in Somerset. They had three sons, Thomas (1648-1691), Francis (1654-1716), and Gerard.

== Career ==
Wyndham spent some of the 1630s travelling and studying in Europe, graduating from the University of Padua in 1635. He returned to England and in April 1640 was elected MP for Minehead in the Short Parliament. When the First English Civil War began in August 1642, Wyndham became a Royalist colonel; in June 1643, he was appointed governor of Dunster Castle, one of the last Royalist positions in the West Country to hold out, surrendering in April 1646.

The Wyndham family was closely connected to the future Charles II of England; Lady Christabella, Francis' sister-in-law and wife of his elder brother Edmund, had been successively Charles' wet nurse, tutor and first lover. Along with his uncle Sir Hugh (1603-1663) who owned a nearby estate at Pilsdon, Wyndham was instrumental in his escape after the Battle of Worcester in 1651, hiding him in his house at Trent, Dorset for several days. (Note: Soldiers looking for Charles were decoyed to search Pilsdon rather than Trent)

During The Protectorate, he was briefly arrested on suspicion of involvement in the 1655 Penruddock uprising before being released without charge. Following the 1660 Stuart Restoration, he was elected MP for Milbourne Port in the Convention Parliament, then re-elected in 1661 for the Cavalier Parliament where he sat until his death. He was also given commissioned as a major in the Royal Horse Guards.

Wyndham inherited Pilsdon when his uncle died in 1663 and was created a baronet on 18 November 1673, apparently in return for foregoing a claim on the Exchequer for £10,800 granted in 1670. He died three years later at the age of 64 and is buried in St Andrews' parish church in Trent.

== Sources ==
- Baggs, A.P.; Bush, R.J.E.; Siraut, M.C. (1985). "Parishes: St. Decumans, including Watchet and Williton". In Dunning, R.W. (ed.). A History of the County of Somerset. Vol. 5. London.
- Burke, John; Burke, Bernard (1841). A Genealogical and Heraldic History of the Extinct and Dormant Baronetcies of England, Scotland and Ireland. John Russell.
- Carter, Susan (2011). "Dunster Castle during the Civil War". Fortified England. 5 (3): 2–6.
- Dalton, Charles (1892). English Army Lists and Commission Registers, 1661–1714, Volume I. Eyre & Spottiswode.
- Helms, M.W.; Cassidy, Irene (1983). "WYNDHAM, Francis (c.1610-76), of Trent, Som. and Pall Mall, Westminster.". In Henning, Basil Duke (ed.). The History of Parliament: the House of Commons 1660-1690 (Online ed.). Boydell & Brewer. ISBN 978-0436192746.
- Hughes, John (1830). The Boscobel Tracts; the escape of Charles II after the Battle of Worcester. Blackwood & Cadell.
- Spencer, Charles, Earl (2017). To Catch A King: Charles II's Great Escape. Collins Publishing. ISBN 978-0008283988.

Parliament of England
Vacant Parliament suspended since 1629	Member of Parliament for Minehead; 1640; With: Alexander Popham; Arthur Duck	Succeeded by Alexander Luttrell; Sir Francis Popham
Baronetage of England
New creation	Baronet (of Trent, Somerset); 1673–1676	Succeeded by Thomas Wyndham
