= George Goring, Lord Goring =

English army officer (1608–1657)

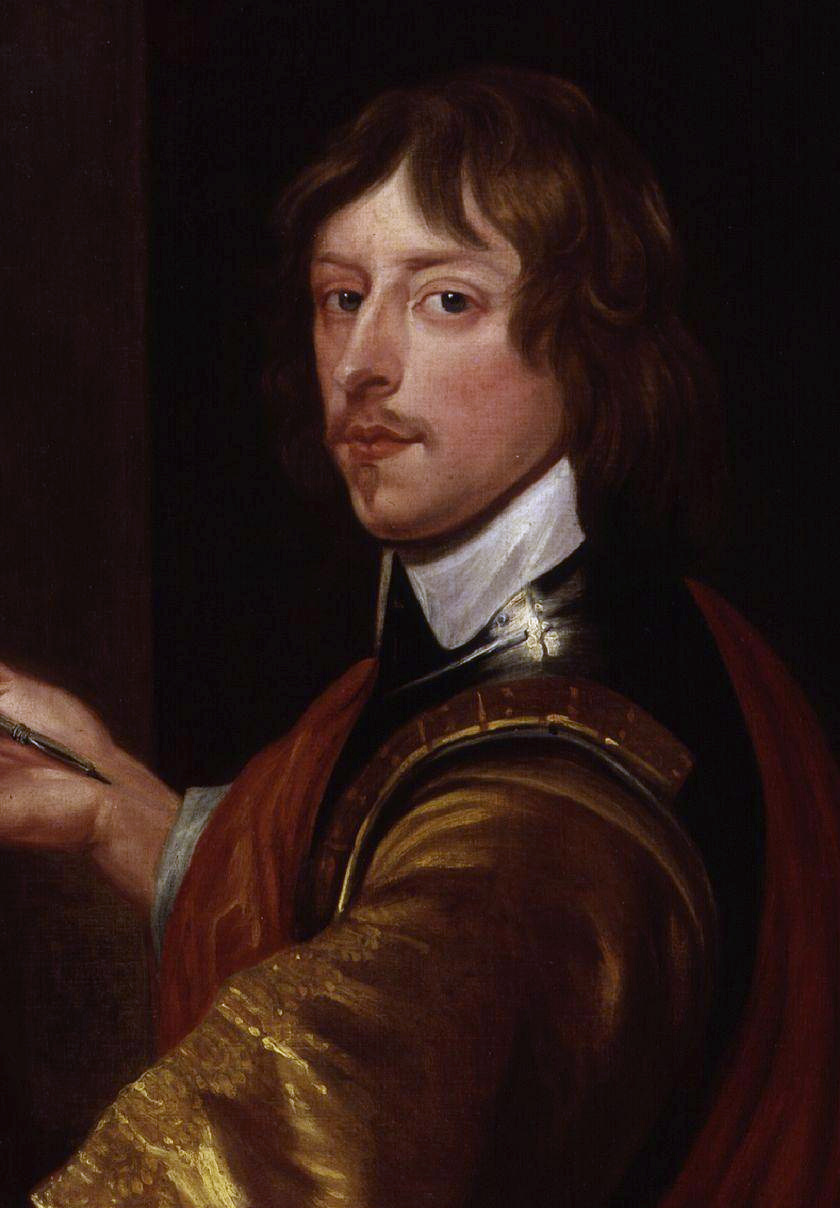
- Portrait of Goring after Anthony van Dyck

Governor of Portsmouth

Personal details
- Born: 14 July 1608
- Died: July-August 1657 Madrid, Spain

Military service
- Allegiance: Dutch Republic; Royalists
- Rank: Lieutenant-General of Horse
- Battles/wars: Eighty Years' War; Siege of Breda (1637) (WIA); Bishops' Wars; First English Civil War; Battle of Seacroft Moor; Battle of Marston Moor; Battle of Langport

George Goring, Lord Goring (14 July 1608 – July-August 1657) was an English army officer. He was known by the courtesy title Lord Goring as the eldest son of George Goring, 1st Earl of Norwich.

== Early life ==
Arms of Goring, Earl of Norwich: Argent, a chevron between three annulets gules

Goring, the eldest son of George Goring, 1st Earl of Norwich, was born on 14 July 1608.

He married Lettice Boyle, the daughter of Richard Boyle, 1st Earl of Cork.

== Experience before the Civil Wars ==
His father-in-law, Richard Boyle, 1st Earl of Cork, procured for him a post in the Dutch Army with the rank of colonel. He was permanently lamed by a wound received at the Siege of Breda in 1637, and returned to England early in 1639, when he was made governor of Portsmouth.

He served in the Bishops' Wars, and already had a considerable reputation when he was involved in the "Army Plot" (1641). Officers of the army stationed at York proposed to petition the king and parliament for the maintenance of the royal authority. A second party was in favour of more violent measures, and Goring, in the hope of being appointed lieutenant-general, proposed to march the army on London and overawe the Parliament during Strafford's trial (1641). This proposition being rejected by his fellow-officers, he betrayed the proceedings to Mountjoy Blount, 1st Earl of Newport, who passed on the information indirectly to John Pym in April.

== Lieutenant-General of Horse ==
Colonel Goring was there upon called on to give evidence before the Commons, who commended him for his services to the Commonwealth. This betrayal of his comrades induced confidence in the minds of the parliamentary leaders, who sent him back to his Portsmouth command. Nevertheless he declared for the king in August. He surrendered Portsmouth to the parliament in September 1642 after the Siege of Portsmouth and went to the Netherlands to recruit for the Royalist army, returning to England in December. Appointed to a cavalry command by the Earl of Newcastle, he defeated Fairfax at Seacroft Moor near Leeds in March 1643, but in May he was taken prisoner at Wakefield on the capture of the town by Fairfax. In April 1644 he effected an exchange.

At the Battle of Marston Moor, Goring commanded the Royalist left, and charged with great success, but, allowing his troopers to disperse in search of plunder, was routed by Oliver Cromwell at the close of the battle. In November 1644, on his father's elevation to the earldom of Norwich, he became Lord Goring. The parliamentary authorities, however, refused to recognise the creation of the earldom, and continued to speak of the father as "Lord Goring" and the son as "General Goring".

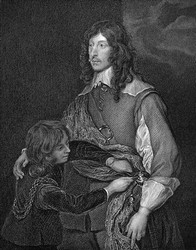
Lord Goring.

In August Goring had been dispatched by Prince Rupert of the Rhine, who recognised his ability, to join Charles I in the south, and in spite of his dissolute and insubordinate character he was appointed to supersede Henry, Lord Wilmot, as lieutenant-general of the Royalist horse. He secured some successes in the west, and in January 1645 advanced through Hampshire and occupied Farnham; but want of money compelled him to retreat to Salisbury and thence to Exeter. The excesses committed by his troops seriously injured the Royalist cause, and his exactions made his name hated throughout the west.

He had himself prepared to besiege Taunton in March 1645, yet when in the next month he was desired by Prince Charles, who was at Bristol, to send reinforcements to Sir Richard Grenville for the siege of Taunton, he obeyed the order only with ill-humour. Later in April 1645 he was summoned with his troops to the relief of the king at Oxford.

Lord Goring had long been intriguing for an independent command, and he now secured from the king what was practically supreme authority in the west. It was alleged by the Earl of Newport that he was willing to transfer his allegiance once more to the parliament. It is not likely that he meditated open treason, but he was culpably negligent and occupied with private ambitions and jealousies. He was still engaged in desultory operations against Taunton when the main campaign of 1645 opened.

For the part taken by Goring's army in the operations of the campaign of Naseby see article First English Civil War, 1645: §§Campaign of Naseby. After the decisive defeat of the king, the army of Fairfax marched into the west and defeated Goring in a disastrous fight at Langport on 10 July 1645. He made no further serious resistance to the parliamentary general, but wasted his time in frivolous amusements.

== Exile and command in Spain ==
In November 1645 he obtained leave to quit his disorganised forces and retire to France on the ground of health. His father's services secured him the command of some English regiments in the Spanish service. He died in Madrid after converting to Catholicism (in the care of the Jesuits) in July or August 1657.

== Character assessment ==
Clarendon says of Goring that he "would, without hesitation, have broken any trust, or done any act of treachery to have satisfied an ordinary passion or appetite; and in truth wanted nothing but industry (for he had wit, and courage, and understanding and ambition, uncontrolled by any fear of God or man) to have been as eminent and successful in the highest attempt of wickedness as any man in the age he lived in or before. Of all his qualifications dissimulation was his masterpiece; in which he so much excelled, that men were not ordinarily ashamed, or out of countenance, with being deceived but twice by him".

Clarendon's assessment, according to Goring's biographer Florene Memegalos is untrustworthy as he appears to have blackened his name at court for personal reasons. Memegalos also asserts from archive material in the Venice State records and other sources, that Goring's reputation stood mainly on his military abilities as a Royalist general and not just on Clarendon's all too obvious character assassination of him.
