= Battle of Langport =

In 1645 the battle of the First English Civil War happened

Coordinates: 51°02′31″N 2°48′04″W

- Part of First English Civil War
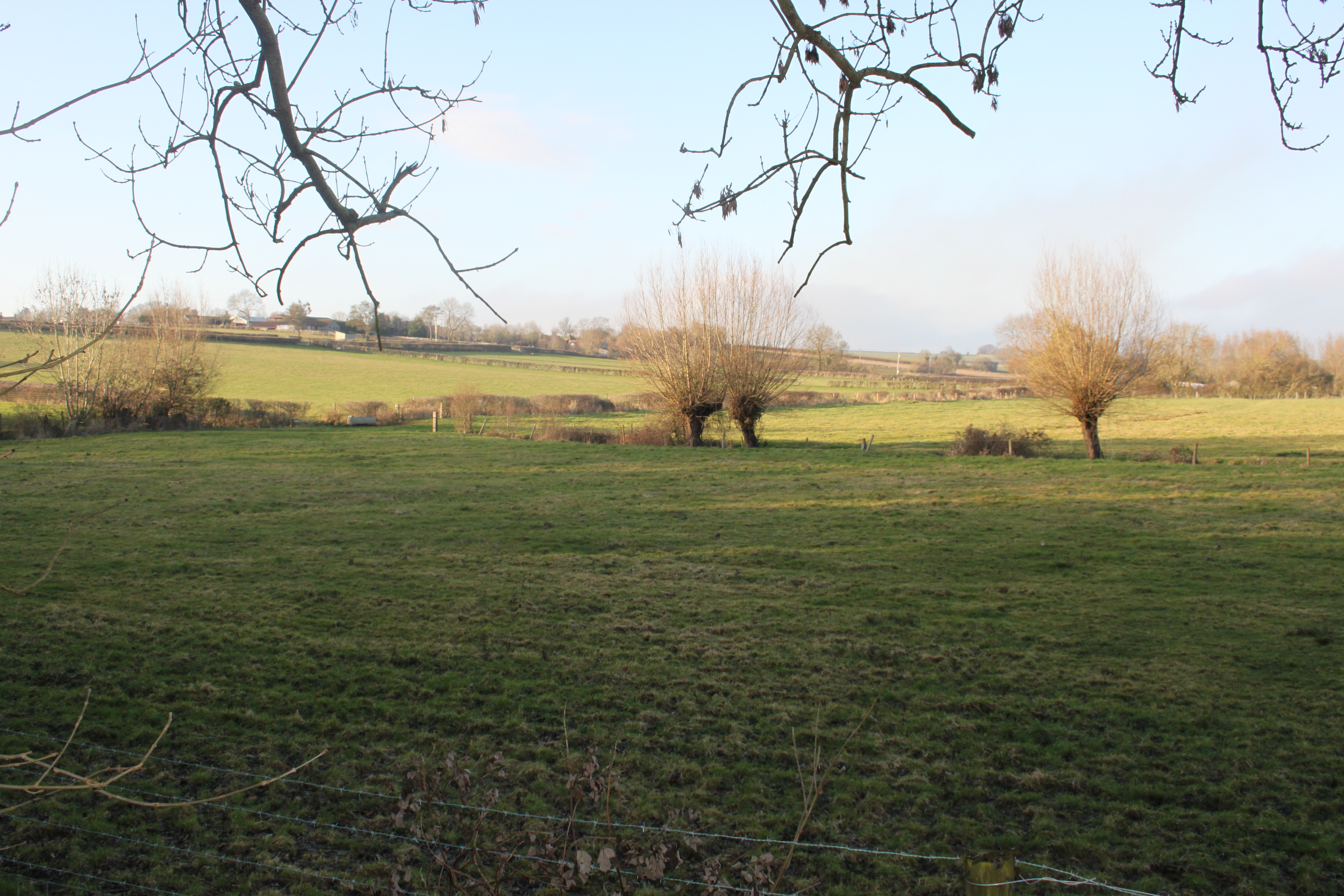
- The site of the battle
Date	10 July 1645
Location	Langport, near Yeovil, Somerset
Result	Parliamentarian victory

Belligerents
Royalists	Parliamentarians

Commanders and leaders
Lord Goring	Sir Thomas Fairfax

Strength
7,000	10,000

Casualties and losses
300 killed 500 captured	20–50 soldiers killed; 2 captains killed (incl. 1 Dutch); 1 captain-lieutenant killed; Wounded: Major Bethell, Col. Butler, and Col. Cooke

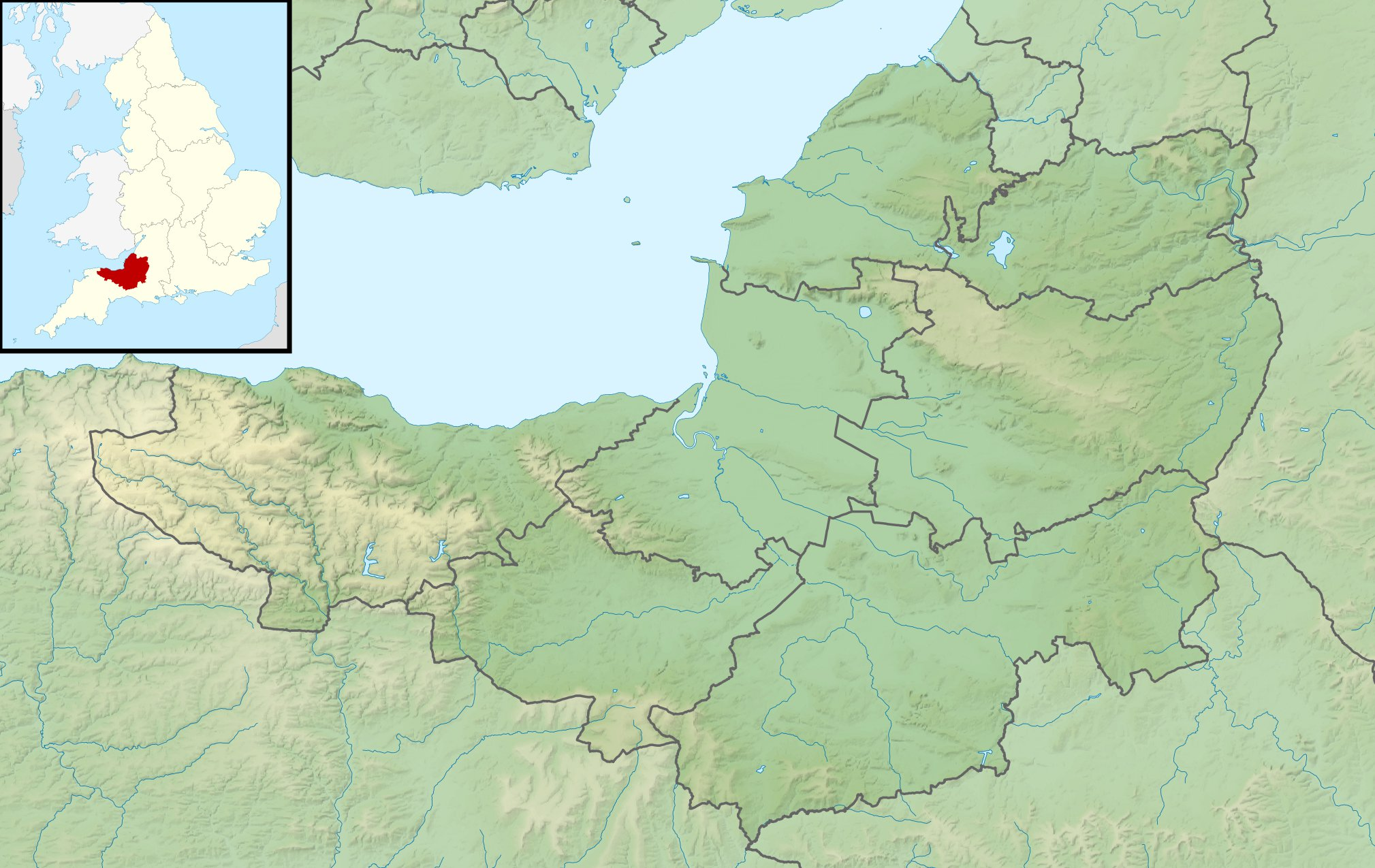
Somerset and Langport

The Battle of Langport took place on 10 July 1645 during the First English Civil War, near Langport in Somerset.

Following its previous success at Naseby in June, in the Battle of Langport, the New Model Army under Sir Thomas Fairfax destroyed the last Royalist field army, led by Lord Goring. This Parliamentarian victory allowed them to besiege the Royalist port of Bristol, which surrendered in September.

== Campaign ==
Taunton had been captured by the Parliamentarian army under the Earl of Essex in June 1644. After Essex's army was forced to surrender at Lostwithiel in Cornwall in September, the Royalists maintained a siege of Taunton, although the town was briefly relieved by Sir William Waller in late November.

When determining strategy for 1645, King Charles I had despatched George, Lord Goring, the lieutenant general of horse (cavalry), to the West Country with orders to retake Taunton and other Parliamentarian outposts in the area. Although Goring briefly rejoined the King's main "Oxford Army", tensions between him and Prince Rupert, the King's captain general, nephew and chief adviser, resulted in Goring's force returning to the west.

Parliament had meanwhile sent a substantial detachment commanded by Colonel Ralph Weldon, consisting of one cavalry regiment and four infantry regiments from their New Model Army, to relieve Taunton. They raised the siege on 11 May, but were themselves besieged by Goring's returning army (although there was no longer any danger of the Royalists storming the town).

On 14 June, the main body of the New Model Army under Sir Thomas Fairfax, with Oliver Cromwell as lieutenant general of horse, won the decisive Battle of Naseby, destroying Charles's main army. After the Royalist garrison of Leicester surrendered four days later, the New Model Army was free to march to the relief of Taunton.

The army marched first south and then west, keeping near the coast so as to keep in touch with Parliament's navy. On 4 July it reached Beaminster, where Fairfax learned that Goring had raised the siege and was retreating towards the Royalist stronghold at Bridgwater. To cover the retreat of the baggage, Goring's army was spread over a front of 12 miles (19 km) along the north bank of the River Yeo, from Langport to Yeovil. The Royalists were outnumbered by Fairfax's army, and their discipline was poor, mainly because a succession of lax Royalist commanders had allowed their men too much license to pillage (which also alienated many of the local people).

Fairfax was joined by Weldon's detachment from Taunton and advanced north towards Goring's army. On 8 July, the Parliamentarians captured Yeovil at the western end of the Royalists' line. The Royalists abandoned the line of the river, and Fairfax crossed to the north side of the Yeo. He sent another Parliamentarian force (part of the army of the "Western Association" under Major General Edward Massie) to deal with an attempted diversion in the direction of Taunton by some of Goring's cavalry under George Porter, a notoriously unreliable officer. Porter's men had neglected to post proper sentries and outposts, and were taken by surprise by Massie and destroyed at Isle Abbots in the early hours of 9 July.

Fairfax had meanwhile advanced in pursuit of Goring, and encountered his main position at Langport late on 9 July.

== Battle ==
The Battle of Langport took place the following day. Goring had occupied a strong rearguard position to cover the withdrawal of his slow-moving artillery and baggage. His main force held a ridge running north to south, a mile east of Langport. The River Yeo prevented any outflanking moves to the south, while any outflanking moves to the north would take time. In front of the ridge was a marshy valley occupied by a stream named the Wagg Rhyne. Only a single narrow lane lined with trees and hedges ran across the stream via a ford, and up to the top of the ridge. Goring placed two light guns in position to fire down the lane, and disposed two raw regiments (those of colonels Wise and Slaughter) of Welsh foot soldiers in the hedges. Three bodies of horse (Goring's life guard, and Goring's and Sir Arthur Slingsby's regiments) waited at the top of the ridge.

Fairfax was prepared to rely on the superior morale of his cavalry to overcome Goring's position. While his artillery silenced Goring's two light guns, he sent 1500 "commanded" (detached) musketeers under Colonel Thomas Rainsborough through the marshes to clear the Welsh infantry from the hedges. He then ordered two "divisions" (half regiments) of horse to charge up the lane. These two divisions were from regiments (Fairfax's and Whalley's) which had originally been part of Cromwell's double regiment of ironsides before being merged into the New Model Army.

The first division, under Major Christopher Bethel, galloped up the lane four abreast, deployed into a line and charged and broke two of the Royalist cavalry regiments. A third Royalist regiment counter-attacked but the second division of Parliamentarian horse, under Major John Desborough, charged and routed them. As more Parliamentarian reinforcements streamed up the lane, Goring's men broke and fled the field.

Cromwell halted his well-disciplined cavalry at the top of the ridge until his forces had reformed. Then they moved rapidly in pursuit. Goring had set fire to Langport to delay the pursuers and tried to rally his army two miles further on, but his army dissolved as Cromwell's troopers approached, abandoning their baggage and most of their weapons. Many of the fugitives were attacked by local clubmen who had banded together to resist exactions by the armies of both sides in the civil war.

== Casualties ==
The Royalists suffered 300 killed and 500 captured.

The Parliamentarians suffered between 20 soldiers killed and 50 soldiers killed. Among the Parliamentarian officers who were wounded were Major Hugh Bethell, Colonel John Butler and Colonel Edward Cooke. Also, two captains (one of whom was Dutch) were killed and one captain-lieutenant was wounded.

== Results ==
Goring's army had been the last effective field army available to the Royalists, whatever its quality. Its loss was a major blow to Royalist morale. On 11 July, Fairfax met representatives from the local clubmen at Middlezoy. He promised that his army would pay for all supplies they took and leave the clubmen in peace provided that they did not assist the Royalists.

Goring left an infantry garrison in Bridgwater and withdrew with his cavalry to Barnstaple, in Devon. He himself was depressed and possibly drinking heavily. Although Bridgwater was a strong position, Fairfax nevertheless stormed the eastern part of the town on 21 July. After a heavy artillery bombardment, Sir Hugh Wyndham surrendered the remaining western part of the town on 23 July.

Fairfax next besieged Sherborne, which was defended by Sir Lewis Dyve. Dyve surrendered on 17 August after artillery and mines breached the castle walls. The New Model Army then stormed the city of Bristol on 10 September, depriving the Royalists of their last major manufacturing centre. Charles had appointed Prince Rupert as governor, but he considered that Rupert had surrendered prematurely, and the two became increasingly estranged.

These Parliamentarian successes isolated the remaining Royalists in the West Country from Charles's forces in Wales, Oxford and the Midlands. The Royalists were no longer able to raise effective field forces and the first civil war ended less than a year later, after the Parliamentarians captured most of the isolated Royalist garrisons.
